= Pakistan Armed Forces =

Combined military forces of Pakistan

- پاکستان مسلح افواج
- Inter-Services Flag of the Pakistan Armed Forces
- Founded: 14 August 1947; 79 years ago
- Service branches: Army; Navy; Air Force
- Headquarters: Joint Staff Headquarters (JSHQ), Rawalpindi, Punjab
- Website: ispr.gov.pk

Leadership
- Commander-in-Chief: President Asif Ali Zardari
- Prime Minister: Shehbaz Sharif
- Minister of Defence: Khawaja Asif
- Defence Secretary: Lt Gen (R) Muhammad Ali
- Chief of Defence Forces: Field Marshal Asim Munir

Personnel
- Active personnel: 660,000 (ranked 7th)
- Reserve personnel: 550,000
- Deployed personnel: Saudi Arabia — 2,600; Qatar — 650

Expenditure
- Budget: US$10.8 billion (2026)
- Percent of GDP: 2.1% (2026)

Industry
- Domestic suppliers: List
- Foreign suppliers: Brazil; China; Germany; Egypt; European Union; France; Iran; Italy; Romania; Russia; Sweden; Switzerland; Turkey; United Kingdom; Ukraine; United States
- Annual exports: US$416 million (2023)

Related articles
- History: Military history of Pakistan; UN peacekeeping missions; Wars Involving Pakistan
- Ranks: Army ranks and insignia Naval ranks and insignia Air Force ranks and insignia

The Pakistan Armed Forces (Urdu: پاکستان مسلح افواج; pronounced [ˈpɑːkˌɪstaːn mʊˈsəlˌle(ɦ) əfˈwɑːd͡ʒ]) are the military forces of Pakistan. It is the world's seventh-largest military measured by active military personnel and consists of three uniformed services—the Army, Navy, and the Air Force, which are backed by several paramilitary forces such as the National Guard and the Civil Armed Forces. As of the 2025 reforms, the highest-ranking military officer is the Chief of Defence Forces (CDF), who also serves concurrently as Chief of Army Staff (COAS), holding principal command authority over all three branches and overseeing war strategy, operations, joint force development, and resource allocation. The office of Chairman Joint Chiefs of Staff Committee (CJCSC) has been abolished, and many prior responsibilities are now assumed by the CDF, streamlining military command and accelerating decision-making.

A pivotal part of the 2025 reforms is the formation of the position of Commander of National Strategic Command (CNSC), a four-star army general appointed by the Prime Minister upon the CDF's recommendation and is responsible for Pakistan's nuclear and strategic assets. The Strategic Plans Division remains crucial, managing nuclear policy of Pakistan and national deterrent under the CNSC's supervision. The President of Pakistan is the commander-in-chief of the Pakistan Armed Forces. All branches of Pakistan Armed Forces are now co-ordinated through the Chief of Defence Forces (CDF), who directs strategic planning, resource allocation, and joint military operations, with the Joint Staff Headquarters (JSHQ) being reorganised to support integrated command across all services from the Joint Staff Headquarters (JSHQ).

Since the 1963 Sino-Pakistan Agreement, the Pakistani military has had close relations with China, jointly working to develop the JF-17, the K-8, and various other weapon systems. As of 2025, China was the largest foreign supplier of military equipment to Pakistan in major arms. The military co-operation between the Chinese People's Liberation Army and Pakistan have accelerated the pace of joint military exercises, and their increasingly compatible weapon supply chains and network communication systems have accelerated the integration of defence capabilities between the two sides. Both nations also co-operate on the development of their nuclear and space technology programmes. Alongside this, the Pakistani military also maintains relations with the United States in history, which gave Pakistan major non-NATO ally status in 2004. Pakistan procures the bulk of its military equipment from China and its own domestic suppliers.

The Pakistan Armed Forces were formed in August 1947, when following the Partition of India the independent states of India and Pakistan came into being. Since then, they have played a decisive role in the modern history of Pakistan, most notably due to fighting major wars with India in 1947–1948, 1965, 1971 and 1999. The armed forces have seized control of the government on several occasions, consequently forming what analysts refer to as a deep state referred to as "The Establishment". The need for border management led to the creation of the National Guard and the Civil Armed Forces to deal with civil unrest in the North-West, as well as the security of border areas in Punjab and Sindh by paramilitary troops. In 2024, the Pakistan Armed Forces had approximately 660,000 active personnel, excluding 25,000+ personnel in the Strategic Plans Division Forces and 291,000 active personnel in the various paramilitary forces. The military has traditionally had a large pool of volunteers, and therefore conscription has never been brought into effect, although both the Constitution of Pakistan and supplementary legislation allow for conscription in a state of war.

Accounting for 18.3% of national government expenditure in 2021, after interest payments, Pakistan's military absorbs a large part of the country's annual budget. The armed forces are generally highly approved of in Pakistani society. As of April 2021, Pakistan was the sixth-largest contributor to United Nations peacekeeping efforts, with 4,516 personnel deployed overseas. Other foreign deployments have consisted of Pakistani military personnel serving as military advisers in various African and Arab countries. The Pakistani military has maintained combat divisions and brigade-strength presences in some Arab states during the Arab–Israeli wars, aided American-led coalition forces in the first Gulf War against Iraq, and actively taken part in the Somali and Bosnian conflicts.

== History ==
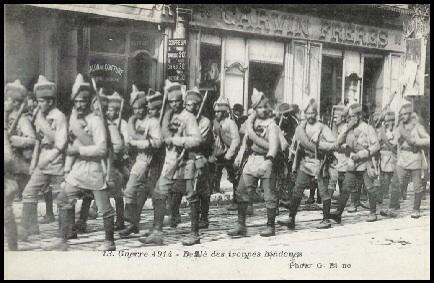
Punjabi Muslims of the British Indian Army. The roots of the Pakistani military trace back to the British Indian Army, which included many personnel from present-day Pakistan.

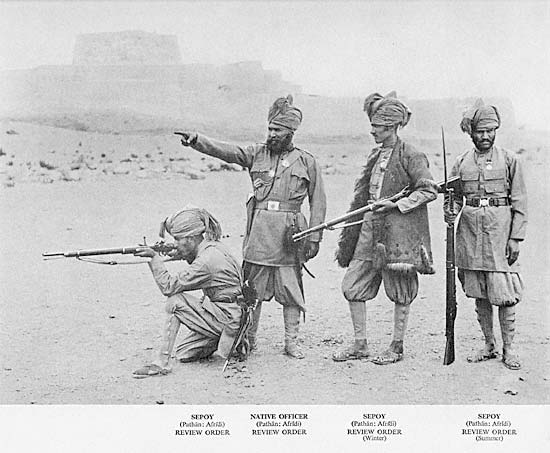
Pictured are troops of the Khyber Rifles, now part of the Frontier Corps, striking a pose, c. 1895

The Pakistani military traces its roots directly back to the British Indian Army, in which many British Indian Muslims served during World War I and World War II, prior to the Partition of India in 1947. Upon Partition, military formations with a Muslim-majority (such as the Indian Army's infantry Muslim regiments) were transferred to the new Dominion of Pakistan, while on an individual basis, Indian Muslims could choose to transfer their allegiance and service to the Pakistan Armed Forces (consisting of the Pakistan Army, Royal Pakistan Navy and Royal Pakistan Air Force) or remain serving in the Indian Armed Forces of the Dominion of India. Significant figures who opted for the former included Ayub Khan (British Indian Army), Haji Mohammad Siddiq Choudri (Royal Indian Navy) and Asghar Khan (Royal Indian Air Force). Many of the senior officers who would form the Pakistan Armed Forces had fought with British forces in World War II, thus providing the newly created country with the professionalism, experience and leadership it would need in its future wars against neighbouring India. In a formula arranged by the British, military resources were to be divided between India and Pakistan in a ratio of 64% going to India and 36% going to Pakistan.

The Pakistani military largely retained British military traditions and doctrine until 1956, when the United States dispatched a specialised Military Assistance Advisory Group to Pakistan to build its military; from this point onward, American military tradition and doctrine became more dominant within Pakistan's armed forces. In March 1956, the order of precedence of the Pakistani military's three formal services changed from "Navy-Army-Air Force" to "Army-Navy-Air Force".

Between 1947 and 1971, Pakistan fought three direct conventional wars against India, with the Indo-Pakistani War of 1971 witnessing the secession of East Pakistan as the independent state of Bangladesh. Rising tensions with Afghanistan in the 1960s (primarily over the Durand Line dispute) and an indirect proxy war fought against the Soviet Union throughout the 1970s and 1980s in the Soviet–Afghan War with American, British and Israeli assistance led to a sharp rise in the development of the Pakistan Armed Forces. In 1999, an extended period of intense border-skirmishing with India, the Kargil War, resulted in a massive redeployment of forces in Kashmir. As of 2014, the military has been conducting counter-insurgency operations along the border areas of Afghanistan, while continuing to participate in several United Nations peacekeeping operations.

Since 1957, the armed forces have taken control from the civilian government in various military coups—ostensibly to restore order in the country, citing corruption and gross inefficiency on the part of the civilian leadership. While many Pakistanis have supported these seizures of power, others have claimed that the rampant political instability, lawlessness and corruption in Pakistan are the direct consequence of consistent military rule. The budget allocation for the Pakistan Armed Forces at over 20% of the annual budget of Pakistan. Elected officials and the lawmakers have been forced to come under military rule for over 30 years of Pakistan's existence.

== Structure ==
Leadership of the Pakistan Armed Forces is provided by the Joint Chiefs of Staff Committee (JCSC), which controls the military from the Joint staff Headquarters (JS HQ), adjacent to the Air HQ, Navy HQ, and Army General HQ (GHQ) in the vicinity of the Rawalpindi Military District, Punjab. The Joint Chiefs of Staff Committee is composed of the Chairman Joint Chiefs, the Chief of Army Staff, the Chief of Air Staff and the Chief of Naval Staff.

At the JS HQ, it forms with the office of the Engineer-in-Chief, Navy Hydrographer, Surgeon-General of each inter-service, director of JS HQ, and Director-Generals (DGs) of Inter-Services Public Relations (ISPR), Inter-Services Selection Board (ISSB), Inter-Services Intelligence (ISI), and the Strategic Plans Division Force (SPD Force).

=== Joint Chiefs of Staff Committee (JCSC) ===
Following military failures in the Indo-Pakistani War of 1971 and Bangladesh Liberation War, federal studies on civil–military relations were held by a commission led by Hamoodur Rahman, Chief Justice of Pakistan. Recommendations of the Hamoodur Rahman Commission helped establish the Joint Chiefs of Staff Committee to co-ordinate all military work and oversee joint missions and their execution during operations.

The chairmanship of the JCSC rotates among the three main service branches, with appointment by the prime minister confirmed by the president. The chairman outranks all other four-star officers; however, he does not have operational command authority over the armed forces. In his capacity as chief military adviser, he assists the prime minister and the minister of defence in exercising their command functions.

Technically, the JCSC is the highest military body; and its chairman serves as the principal staff officer (PSO) to the civilian prime minister, Cabinet, National Security Council (its adviser), and president. The JCSC deals with joint military planning, joint training, integrated joint logistics, and provides strategic directions for the armed forces; it periodically reviews the role, size, and condition of the three main service branches; and it advises the civilian government on strategic communications, industrial mobilisations plans, and formulating defence plans. In many ways, the JCSC provides an important link to understand, maintain balance, and resolve conflicts between military and political circles. In times of peace, the JCSC's principle functions are to conduct planning of civil–military input; in times of war, the chairman acts as principal military adviser to the prime minister in the supervision and conduct of joint warfare.

Flag	Position	Photo	Incumbent	Service branch
	Chief of Defence Forces (CDF) / Chief of the Army Staff (COAS)		Field Marshal; Asim Munir	Pakistan Army
	Chief of the Naval Staff (CNS)		Admiral; Naveed Ashraf	Pakistan Navy
	Chief of the Air Staff (CAS)		Air Chief Marshal; Zaheer Ahmad Babar	Pakistan Air Force

== Service branches ==
=== Army ===
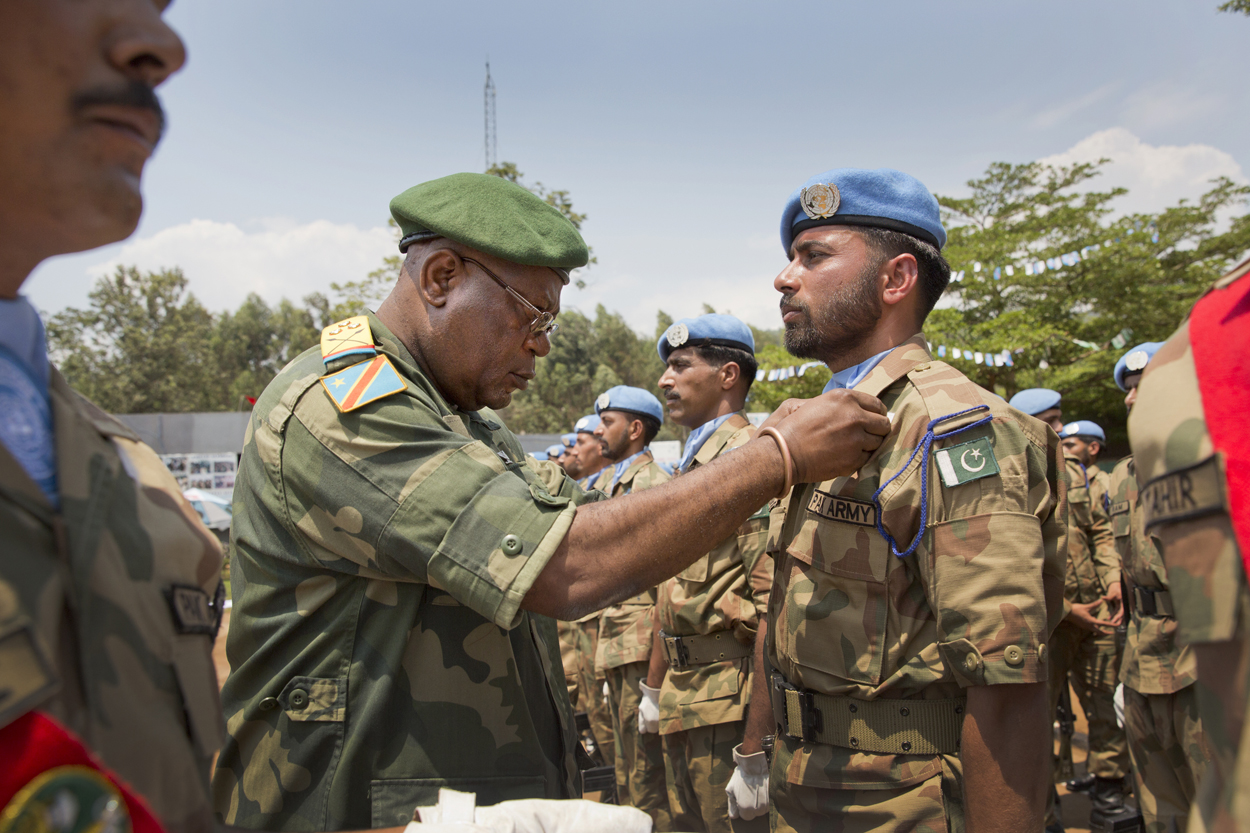
Pakistani soldiers being decorated after a tour of duty with the UN in the DR Congo

After the partitioning of British India in 1947, the Pakistan Army was formed by Indian Muslim officers serving in the British Indian Army. The largest branch of the nation's military, it is a professional, volunteer fighting force, with about 560,000 active personnel and 550,000 reserves (though estimates vary widely). Although, the Constitution provides a basis for the service draft, conscription has never been imposed in Pakistan. A single command structure known as General Headquarters (GHQ) is based at Rawalpindi Cantt, adjacent to the Joint staff HQ. The army is commanded by the Chief of Army Staff (COAS), by statute a four-star army general, appointed by the president with the consultation and confirmation of the prime minister. As of 2022, General Asim Munir was the chief of army staff. Army General Sahir Shamshad Mirza is the current chairman of the Joint Chiefs of Staff Committee. The army has a wide range of corporate (e.g.: Fauji Foundation), commercial (e.g.: Askari Bank), and political interests, and on many occasions has seized control of the civilian government to restore order in the country.

The Army Aviation Corps reportedly operates about 250 aircraft, including approximately 40 AH-1 Cobra combat helicopters. The Army Strategic Forces Command operates a wide range of missile systems in its arsenal. In spite of the Pressler amendment enforced in the 1990s, the army has been focused on development of land-based weapon systems and production of military hardware. Domestic innovation resulted in the successful development of G3A3 rifles, Anza missile systems, and Al-Zarrar and Al-Khalid main battle tanks (MBTs).

Since 1947, the army has waged three wars with neighbouring India, and several border skirmishes with Afghanistan. Due to Pakistan's diverse geography, the army has extensive combat experience in a variety of terrains. The army has maintained a strong presence in the Arab world during the Arab–Israeli Wars, aided the Coalition Forces in the first Gulf War, and played a major role in combat in the Bosnian War as well as rescuing trapped American soldiers in Mogadishu, Somalia in 1993. Recently, major joint-operations undertaken by the army include Operation Black Thunderstorm and Operation Rah-e-Nijat, against armed insurgents within Pakistan. The army has also been an active participant in UN peacekeeping missions.

=== Air Force ===
Brought into existence in 1947 with the establishment of the Pakistan Air Force Academy, the Pakistan Air Force (PAF) is regarded as a "powerful defence component of the country's defence." The prefix "Royal" was added in 1947, but dropped when Pakistan became an Islamic republic in 1956. The PAF is the seventh-largest air force and the largest in the Muslim world, with about 943 combat fighter jets and over 200 trainer, transport, communication, helicopter, and force-multiplier aircraft. A single command structure Air Headquarters (AHQ) is based at Islamabad. The air force is commanded by the Chief of Air Staff (CAS), by statute a four-star air chief marshal, appointed by the president, with the consultation and confirmation of the prime minister. As of March 2021, Air Chief Marshal Zaheer Ahmad Babar is the CAS.

In many important events in Pakistan's history, the air force has played a pivotal, influential, and crucial role in the nation's defence and national security, and promoted a sense of security in civil society. Its military significance and importance in public perception contribute to the PAF's dominance over the other major service branches. The PAF officially uses the slogan: "Second to None; fully abreast with the requisite will and mechanism to live by its standards in the coming millennium and beyond."

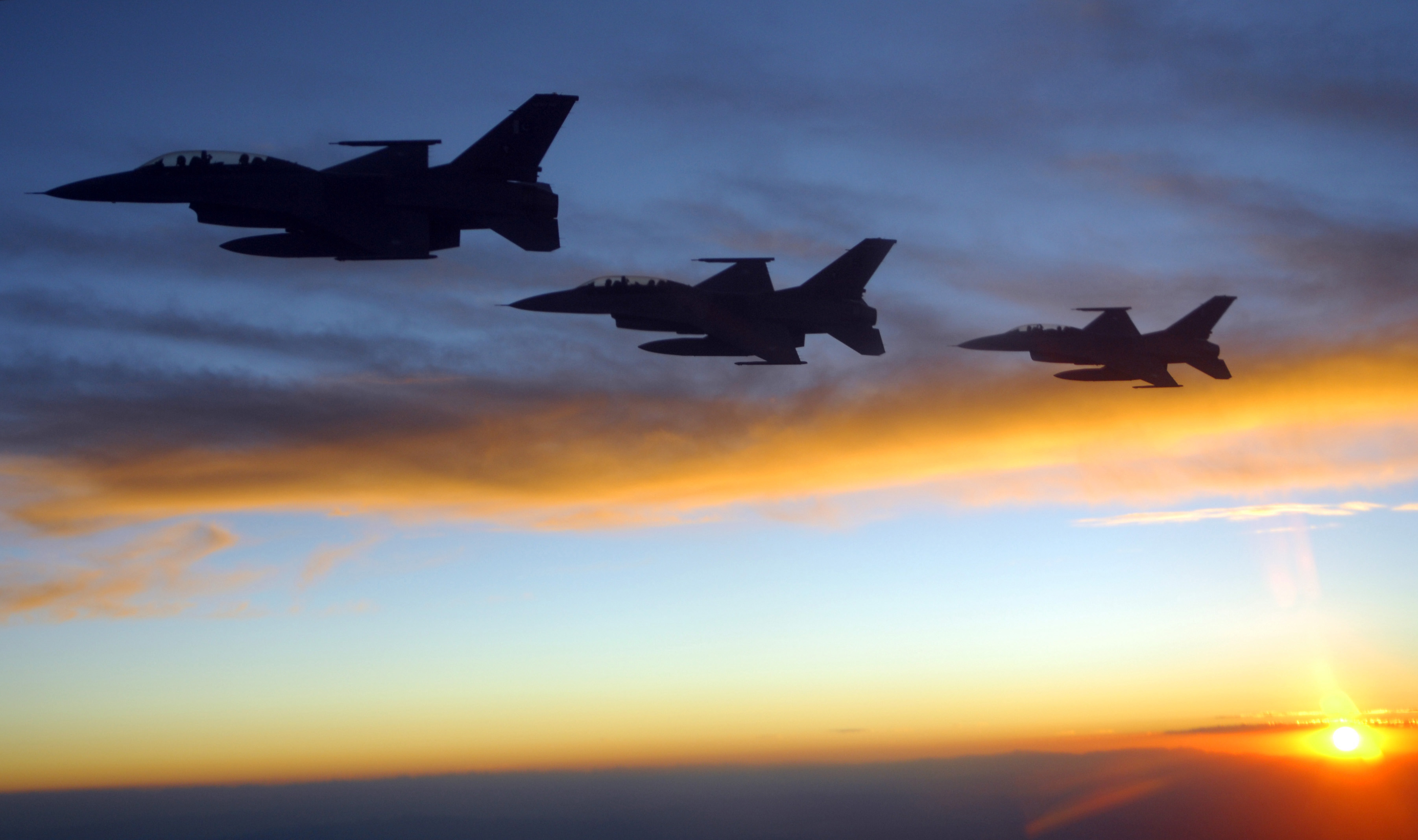
PAF F16s in tight formation in Nevada, US, c. 2010

Historically, the air force has been heavily dependent on US, Chinese, and French aircraft technology to support its growth, despite impositions of the Pressler amendment. While F-16s continue to be a backbone of the air force, the local development and quick production of the JF-17 have provided an alternative route to meet its aerial combat requirements. According to PAF accounts, the air force plans to retire several of its ageing French-licensed Mirage III and Mirage 5 fighter jets.

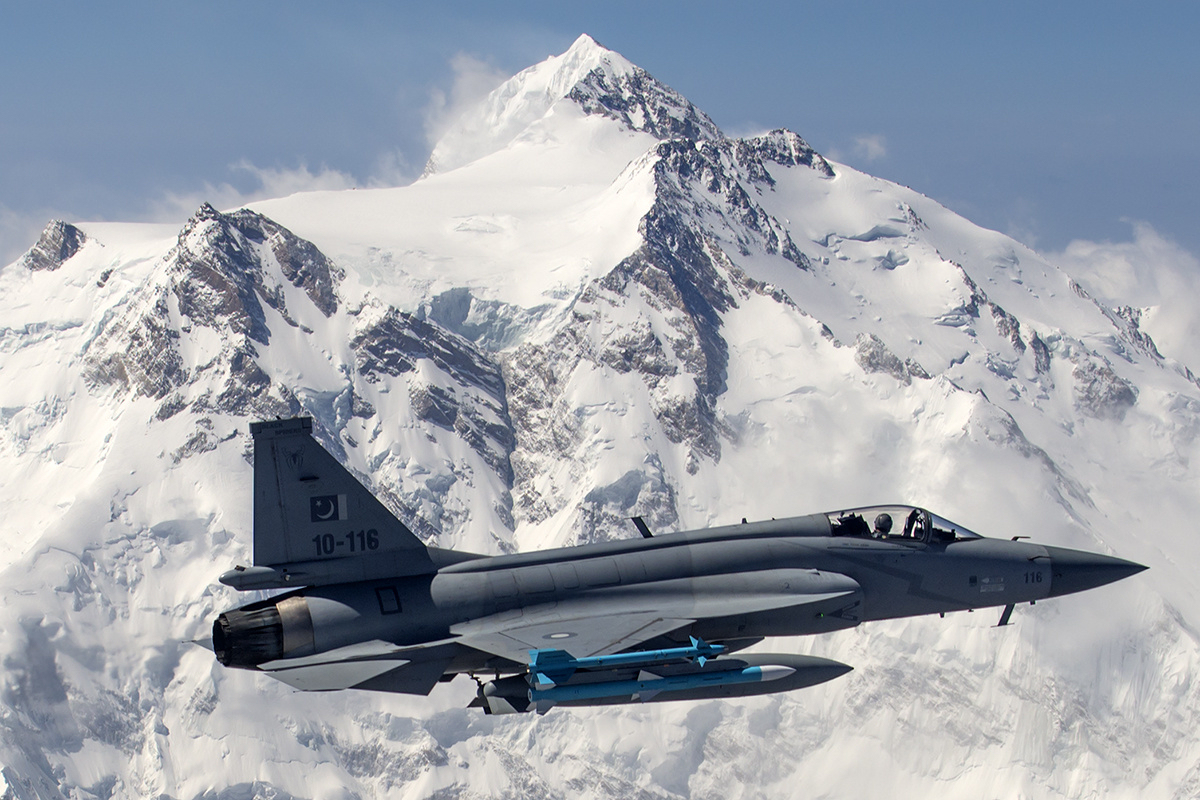
Pakistan's domestically produced JF-17 Thunder, developed jointly by PAC and CAC

Joint production with the Chinese Air Force of a light-weight multi-role combat aircraft and further avionics development of the JF-17 is ongoing at the Pakistan Aeronautical Complex (PAC). As of 2016, 70 JF-17s are operational and have replaced 50 Mirage IIIs and F-7Ps. The PAF plans to replace all F-7Ps and Mirage III/5 aircraft by 2020. The F-7PG will be replaced later, and the JF-17 fleet may eventually be expanded to 300 aircraft. Realising the importance of fifth generation fighter aircraft, the PAF successfully negotiated for the procurement of approximately 36 Chinese FC-20 fighter jets – a deal worth around US$1.4 billion, signed in 2009. It was expected that the FC-20s would be delivered in 2015. In close co-ordination with Turkish Aerospace Industries, the PAC engaged in a mid-life update (MLU) programme of its F-16A/Bs, approximately 26 of which are in service. In 2010, the air force procured at least 18 newly built F-16C/D Block 52s under the Peace Gate-II by the United States.

In 2009, the PAF enlisted two types of airborne early warning and control (AEW&C) systems aircraft: four Erieye-equipped Saab 2000s from Sweden, and a Chinese AWACS based on the Shaanxi Y-8F cargo aircraft. Four Ilyushin Il-78 aerial tankers, capable of refuelling F-16, Mirage III, Mirage 5, JF-17, and FC-20 fighters, have been acquired second-hand from Ukrainian surplus stocks. The fleet of FT-5 and T-37 trainers is to be replaced with approximately 75 K-8 Karakorum intermediate jet training aircraft. Other major developments continue to be under development by the local aerospace industries; some of its electronic systems were exhibited in IDEAS 2014 held in Karachi. Since the 1960s, the PAF has held regular combat exercises, such as Exercise Saffron Bandit and Exercise High Mark, modelled on the USAF Weapons School; many authors believe the PAF is capable of mastering the methods of "toss bombing" since the 1990s.

=== Navy ===
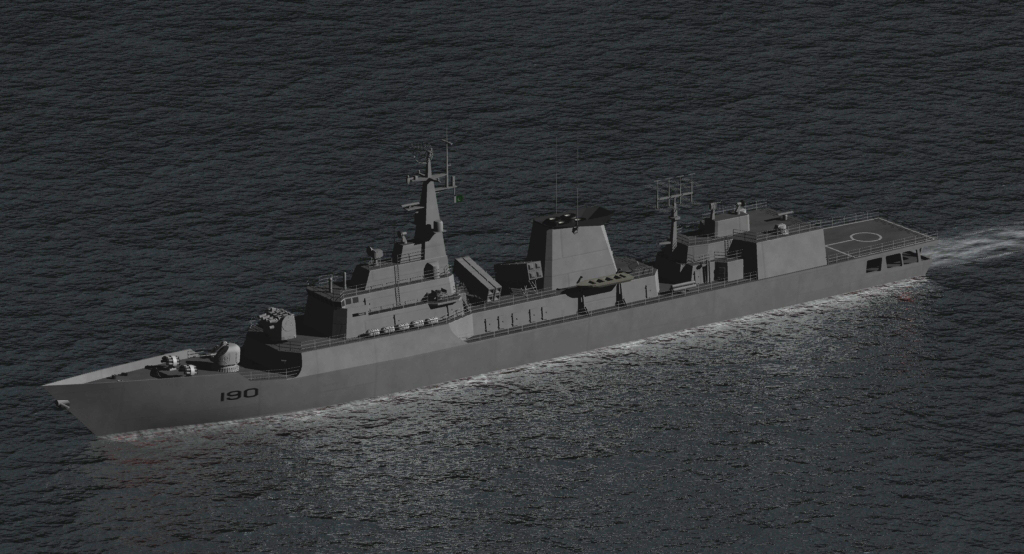
F-22P Zulfiquar-class frigates, built in KSEW

The Pakistan Navy was formed in 1947 by the Indian Muslim officers serving in the Royal Indian Navy. The prefix "Royal" was soon added but dropped in 1956 when Pakistan became an Islamic republic. Its prime responsibility is to provide protection of nation's sea ports, marine borders, approximately 1,000 km (650 mi) of coastline, and supporting national security and peacekeeping missions. With approximately 30,000 active duty personnel and commissioned warships, its operational scope has expanded to greater national and international responsibility in countering the threat of sea-based global terrorism, drug smuggling, and trafficking issues.

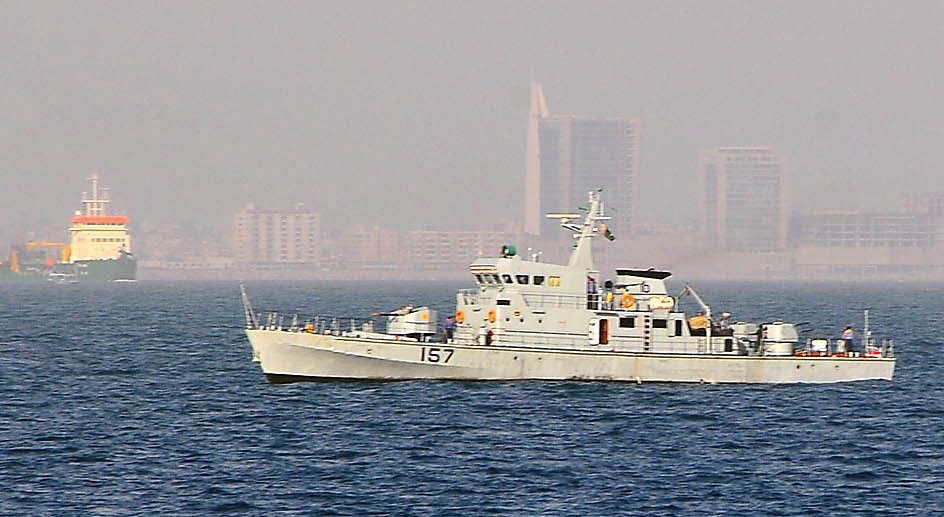
PNS Larkana in Karachi

A single command structure known as Naval Headquarters (NHQ) is based at the Rawalpindi Cantt, adjacent to the Joint Staff HQ. The navy is commanded by the Chief of Naval Staff (CNS), who is by statute a four-star admiral, appointed by the president, with the required consultation and confirmation of the prime minister. As of October 2020, Admiral Muhammad Amjad Khan Niazi is the chief of naval staff.

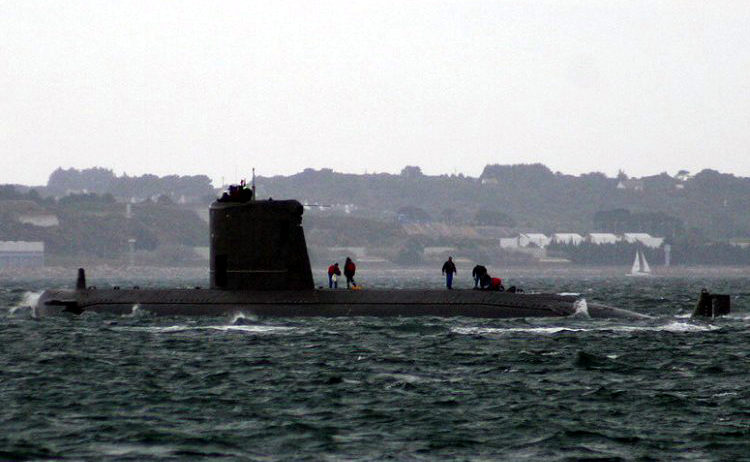
The Navy operates the domestically built Agosta 90B submarines.

Navy Day is celebrated on 8 September to commemorate its service in the Indo-Pakistani War of 1965. According to author Tariq Ali, the navy lost one-half of its force in the Indo-Pakistani War of 1971. The Navy heavily depended on American-built naval technology and operated a large infrastructure from 1947 to 1971. The Pressler amendment forced an embargo in the 1990s, during which the navy developed air independent propulsion (AIP) technology purchased from France and built the Agosta-class submarines; two of these (as well as one of the new frigates) were built at Pakistan's facilities in Karachi. The navy's surface fleet consists of helicopter carriers, destroyers, frigate, amphibious assault ships, patrol ships, mine-countermeasures, and miscellaneous vessels. Established in 1972, the Naval Air Arm provides fleet air defence, maritime reconnaissance, and anti-submarine warfare capability. Mirage 5 aircraft donated by the PAF are flown by the Navy, equipped with Exocet anti-ship missiles. The Navy's fleet of P-3C Orion turboprop aircraft, equipped with electronic intelligence (ELINT) systems, play a pivotal role in the Navy's gathering of intelligence. Since 2001, the navy has emphasised its role and expanded its operational scope across the country with the establishment of Naval Strategic Forces Command, based in Islamabad.

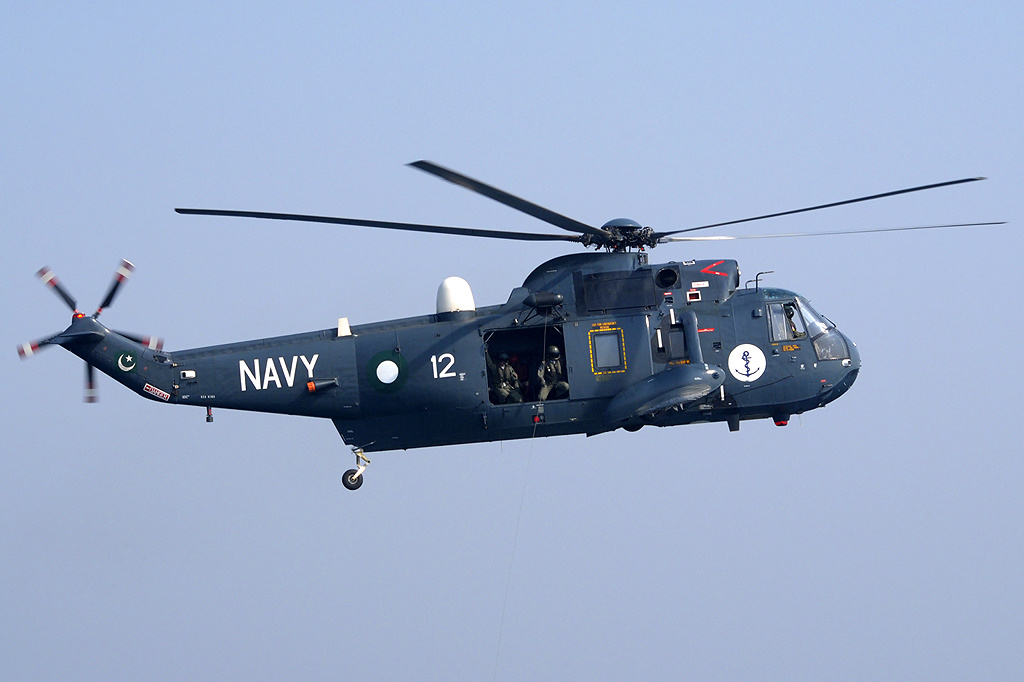
A Pakistan Navy's Westland Sea King

In the 1990s, the navy lost its opportunity to equip itself with latest technology and negotiated with the Royal Navy to acquire ageing Tariq-class destroyers in 1993–94, which continue to be extensively upgraded. During the same time, the Navy engaged in a process of self-reliance and negotiated with China for assistance. This ultimately led the introduction of F-22P Zulfiquar-class frigates, which were designed and developed at the Karachi Shipyard and Engineering Works (KSEW); at this same time, the Agosta-90B submarines were also built. Pakistan's role in the war on terror led to a rapid modernisation, which saw the induction of the PNS Alamgir anti-submarine warship in 2011. The submarines remain to be backbone of the navy, which has been developing a nuclear submarine. Since 2001, media reports have been surfaced that the Navy has been seeking to enhance its strategic strike capability by developing naval variants of the nuclear cruise missile. The Babur cruise missile has a range of 700 kilometres (430 mi) and is capable of using both conventional and nuclear warheads. Future developments of Babur missiles include capability of being launched from submarines, surface ships, and a range extension to 1,000 kilometres (620 mi). An air-launched version, Ra'ad, has been successfully tested.

Since the 1990s, the navy has been conducting joint naval exercises and has participated in multinational task forces such as CTF-150 and CTF-151.

Aircraft in the Navy
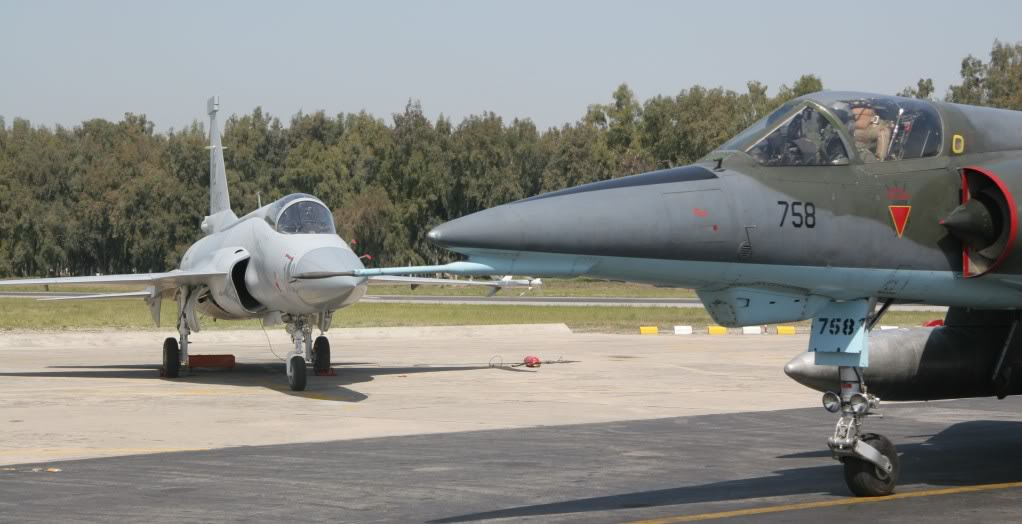
A Navy Mirage-5E (with Sky blue markings underneath) with JF-17, which are flown by navy pilots but remain under air force.

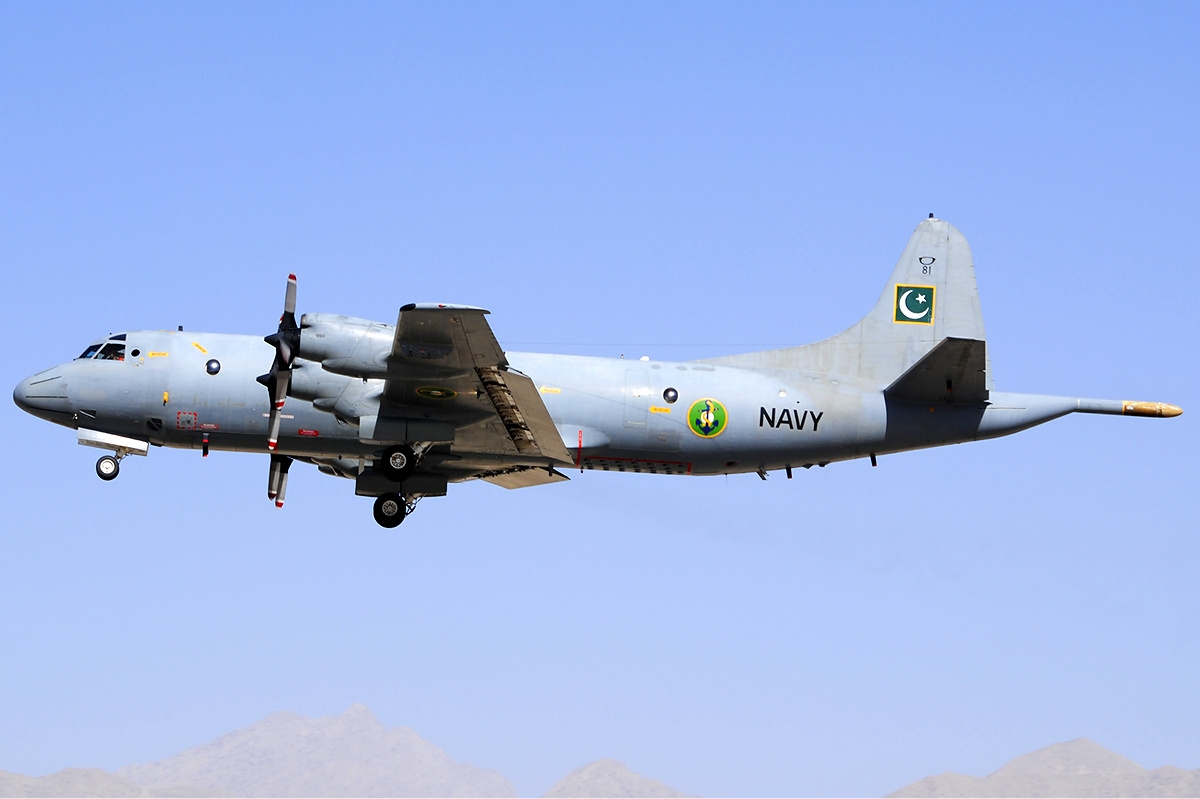
A Navy P3C-Orion in flight

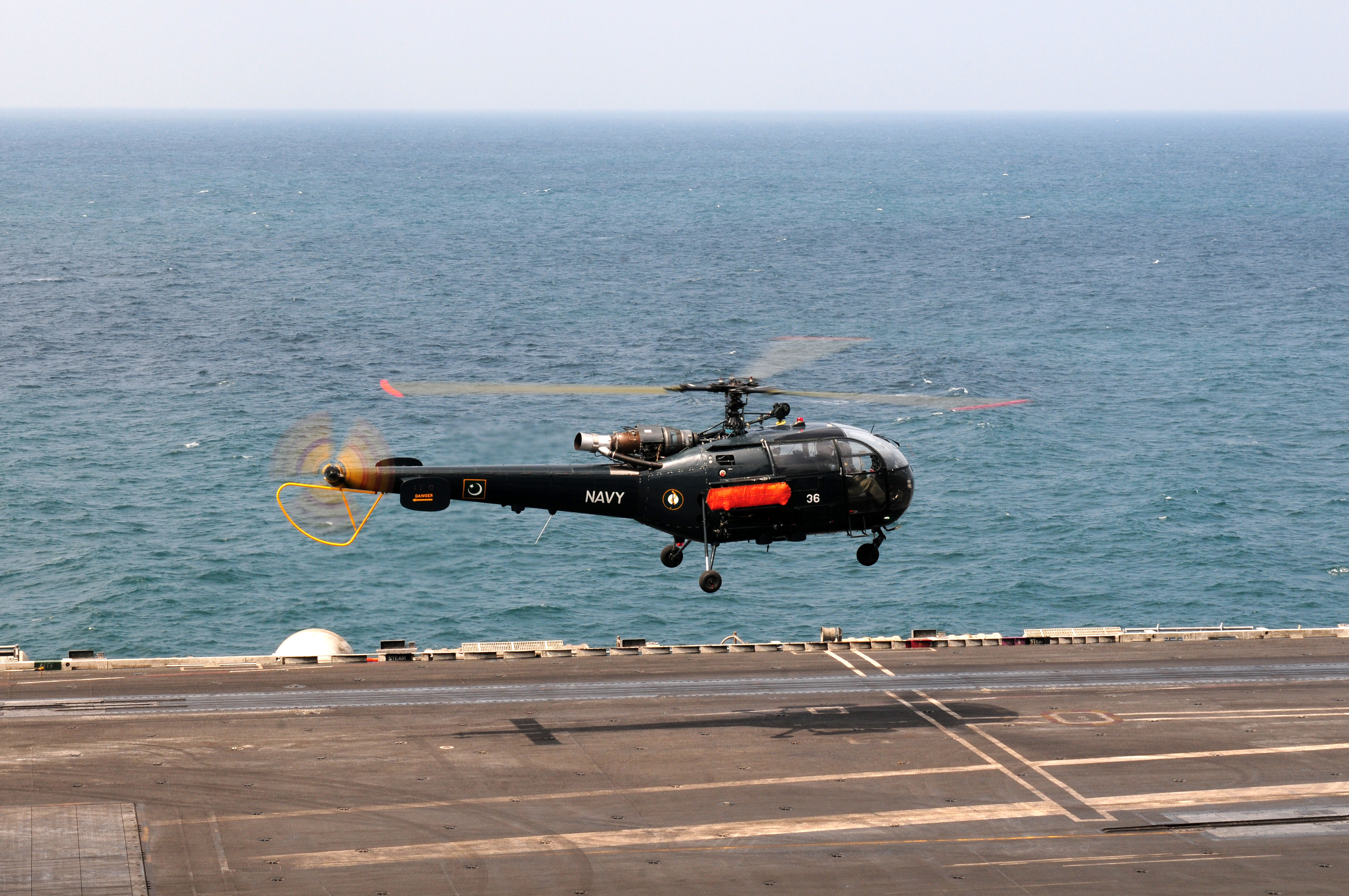
A Pakistan navy SA-319B Alouette III helicopter lands aboard the aircraft carrier USS George H.W. Bush

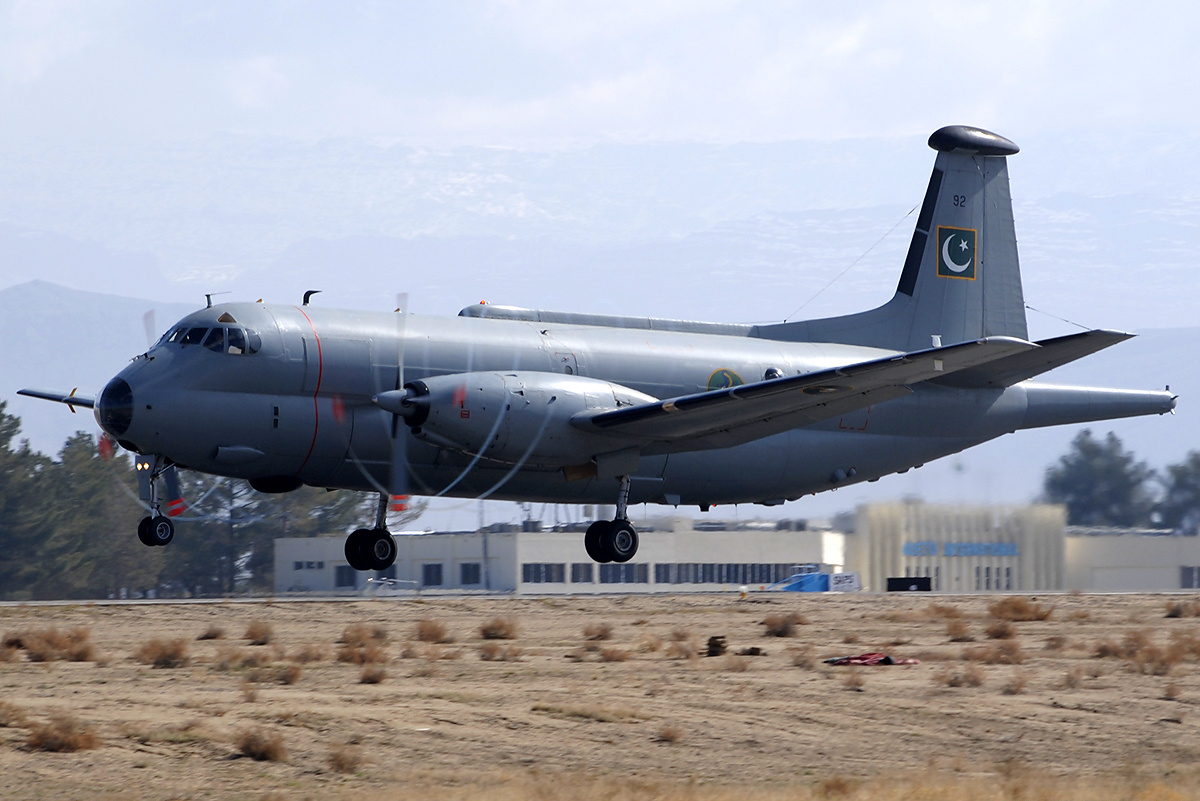
A Pakistan Navy Breguet Atlantic Asuspine-1 taxied.
Naval Air Arm copyright, Commons

==== Marines ====
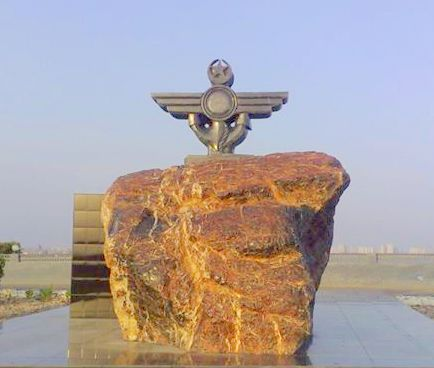
Badge logo of Pakistan Marines

Recommended by the Navy, based on Royal Marines, the Pakistan Marines were established on 1 July 1971 to undertake riverine operations in East Pakistan. The Marines saw their first combat actions in amphibious operations during the Bangladesh Liberation War, fighting against the Indian Army. Due to poor combat performance in the war, high losses and casualties, and inability to effectively counter the Indian Army, the Marines were decommissioned by 1974. However, Marines continued to exist in its rudimentary form until 1988 to meet fundamental security requirements of Pakistan Navy units. In 1990, the Marines were recommissioned under Commander M. Obaidullah.

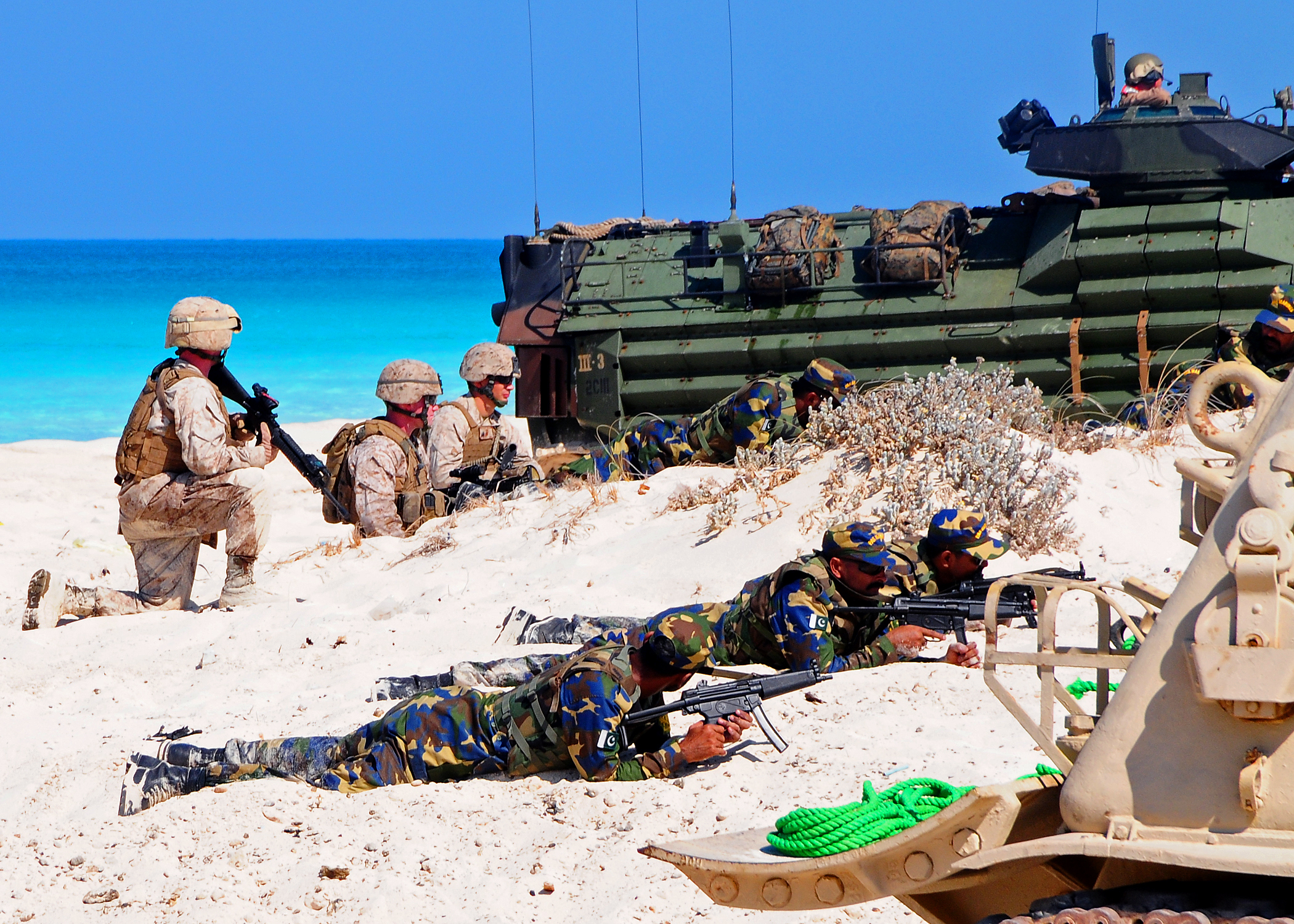
Pakistan Marines in close co-ordination with the US Marines Corps, 2009

The Marines are the uniform service branch within the Navy whose leadership comes directly from the Navy. It shares the Navy's rank code, but conducts its combined combat training with army at Pakistan Military Academy Kakul and School of Infantry in Quetta.

Its single command structure is based at the Manora Fort in Qasim Marine Base in Karachi and the Marines are under the command of the Commander Coast (COMCOAST), by statute a two-star rear-admiral. According to the ISPR, the Marines are deployed at the southeastern regions of Pakistan to avoid infiltration and undercover activities from the Indian Army.

A small number of Marine Battalions are deployed at the Sir Creek region to deter the Indian Army, and co-ordinated the relief efforts in the 2010 Pakistan floods. Almost an entire combat contingent of Marines were deployed in Sindh and Southern Punjab to lead the flood-relief operations in 2014.

For intelligence purposes, the army immediately raised the combat battalion of the Marines, from the officers of the Navy, in 1999. Major intelligence activities are gathered from the Sir Creek region by the Marines, where an entire battalion is deployed to conduct reconnaissance.

=== Paramilitary forces ===
==== Civil Armed Forces ====
The Civil Armed Forces (CAF) of Pakistan comprise several paramilitary organisations, separate and functionally distinct from the regular Pakistan Armed Forces. Operating under the purview of the Ministry of Interior in peacetime, the CAF shoulders the crucial responsibility of maintaining internal security. This encompasses assisting civilian law enforcement agencies in tasks like crime prevention, border control and public order maintenance. The CAF additionally plays a vital role in counter-insurgency and counter-terrorism operations, along with tackling anti-smuggling activities. During natural disasters, the CAF collaborates closely with the military to provide relief and support. In times of war, the CAF falls under the direct command of the Ministry of Defence and the Pakistan Armed Forces. Estimates from 2024 place the strength of the CAF at approximately 291,000 personnel. With the exception of the Frontier Constabulary, command positions within the CAF are typically filled by officers on secondment from the Pakistan Army.

==== Pakistan National Guard ====
Pakistan National Guard is a military reserve force and a component of the Pakistan Army. Functioning as a "second line of defence" alongside the Pakistan Army Reserve and the Civil Armed Forces, the National Guard's primary roles include internal security, disaster relief and wartime support for the regular army. Established on 1 January 1948, it comprises approximately 185,000 personnel with its headquarters at the General Headquarters (GHQ) in Rawalpindi.

== Personnel ==
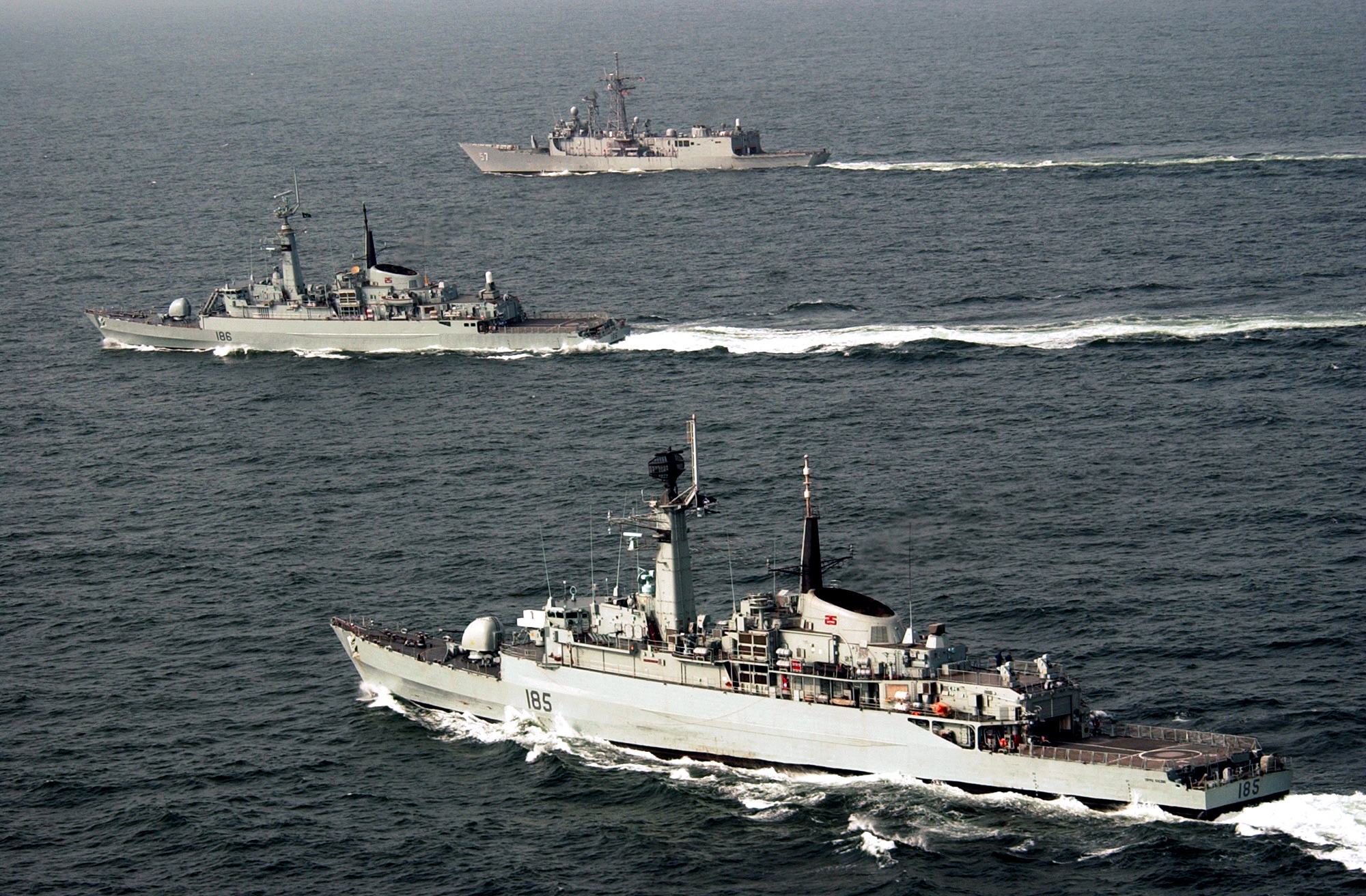
PNS Shah Jahan (middle) and PNS Tippu Sultan (front) of the Pakistan Navy

=== Troop strength ===
As of 2024, estimations by national and international bodies were that approximately 660,000 people were on active duty in the three main service branches, with an additional 291,000 serving in paramilitary forces and 550,000 in reserve. It is an all-volunteer military, but conscription can be enacted at the request of the president with the approval of the parliament of Pakistan. The military is the seventh largest in the world and has troops deployed around the globe in military assistance and peacekeeping operations.

Pakistan is the only predominantly Muslim country in which women serve as high-ranking officers and in combat roles, and a sizeable unit of female army and air force personnel has been actively involved in military operations against Taliban forces.

Members of the Pakistani military hold a rank, either that of officer or enlisted, and can be promoted.

The following table summarises current Pakistani military staffing:

Pakistani military troop levels
Service	Total active-duty personnel	Total reserve
Army	560,000	550,000
Navy	30,000	5,000
Air Force	70,000	8,000
National Guard	185,000	None
Civil Armed Forces	291,000+	None
SPD Force	25,000+	Unknown

=== Uniforms ===
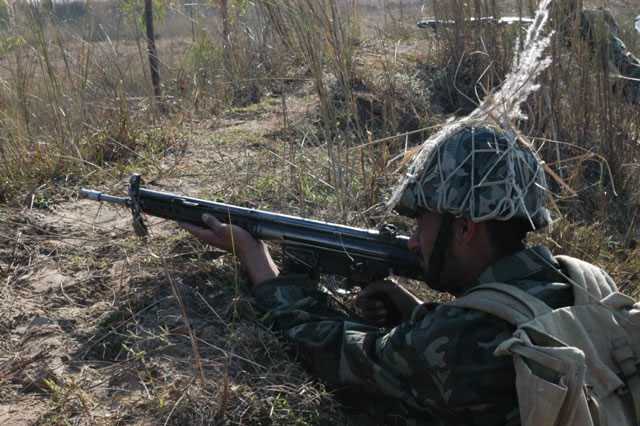
A Pakistan Army soldier in combat gear during training

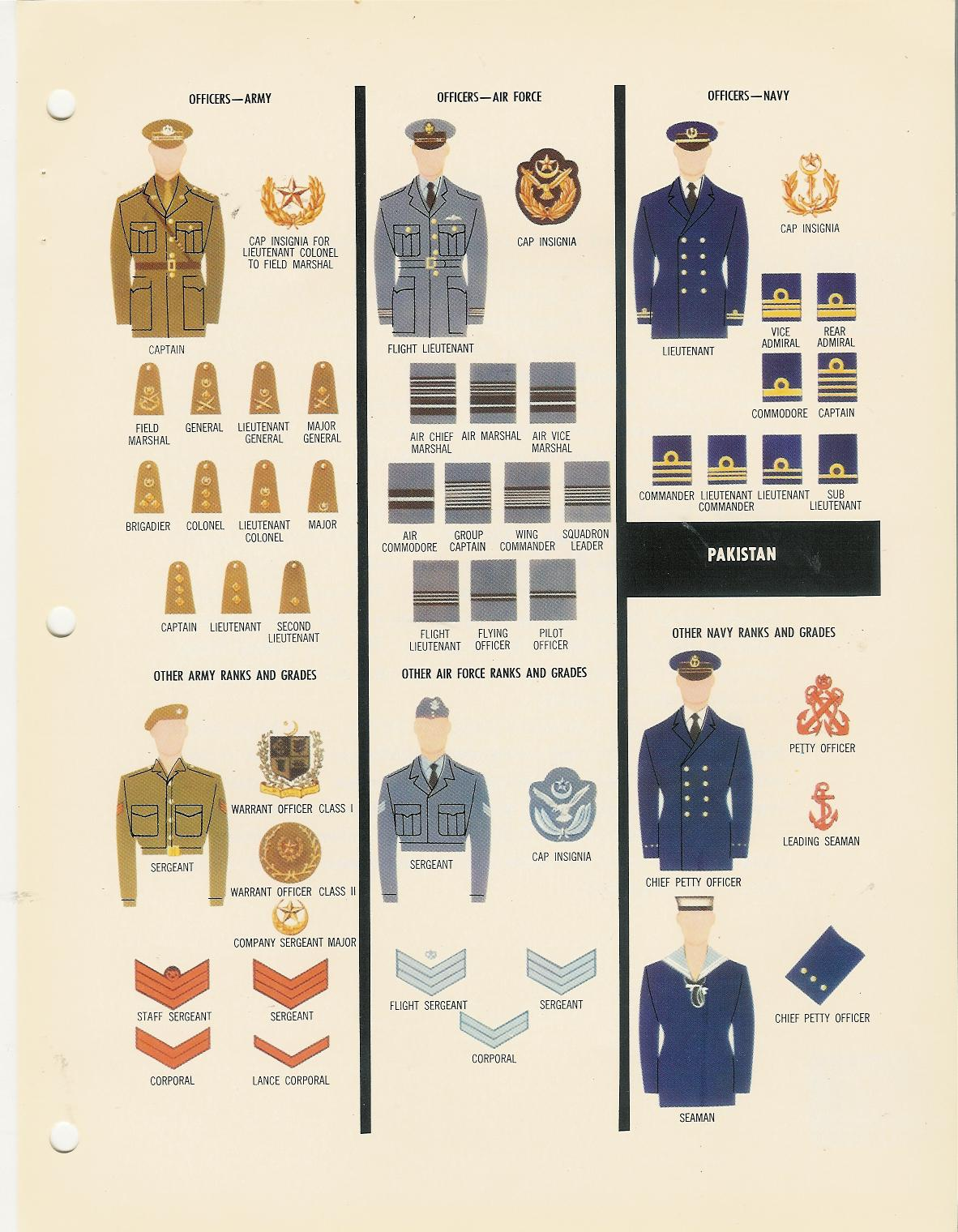
Military uniforms 1959–1962

From 1947 to the early 2000s, Pakistan's military uniforms closely resembled those of their counterparts in the British armed services. The Army uniform consisted of plain yellowish khaki, which was the standard issue as both the combat uniform (ACU) and the service uniform (ASU). The Pakistan Air Force (PAF) uniform was primarily based on the Royal Air Force uniform, with bluish-grey as its reporting colour markings. The Navy uniform was likewise based on the Royal Navy uniform, with predominant colours of navy blue and white.

In 2003, the service uniforms for each major service branch were revised and orders were made to issue new uniforms roughly based on the American military. With Marines reestablished in 2004, the Universal Camouflage Pattern (UCP) uniforms are now worn by each service in respect to their colours; the flag of Pakistan patch worn on the shoulder became compulsory.

In the military, the service dress, however, remains yellowish khaki for the Army; plain white service dress for the Navy (excluding the Marines). The Air Force abandoned its rank and uniform structure in 2006, and introduced its own uniform insignia which closely resembled that of the Turkish Army. Army service uniform consists of a round shoulder patch of army's insignia. Prior to becoming a republic; the shoulder patches were of the pattern inherited from the British Indian Army, and resembled the shape of the Crusader shields. In 1956, the Pakistan Army decided to adopt a round shape that reflected Islamic Heritage.

The Army's standard UCP is based on a pixelated version of the region's arid desert patterns. The army's UCP varies depending on the type of missions and deployment it is being used for. The Navy's UCP is based on a design that incorporates sparse black and medium grey shapes on a light grey background. The Marines have a woodland pattern featuring light brown, olive green and dark blue shapes on a tan or light olive background. Slight colour variations have been noted. Other than a greenish flight suit and a standard service dress, the Air Forces's Airman Battle Uniform (ABU) camouflage features a variation of the six-colour desert pattern. In each service's UCP, the name of the service branch, rank, and gallantry badges are worn on the chest; insignia are worn on the shoulders with the compulsory flag-of-Pakistan patch.

Uniforms and camouflage codes of the Pakistan Armed Forces, 1947–present
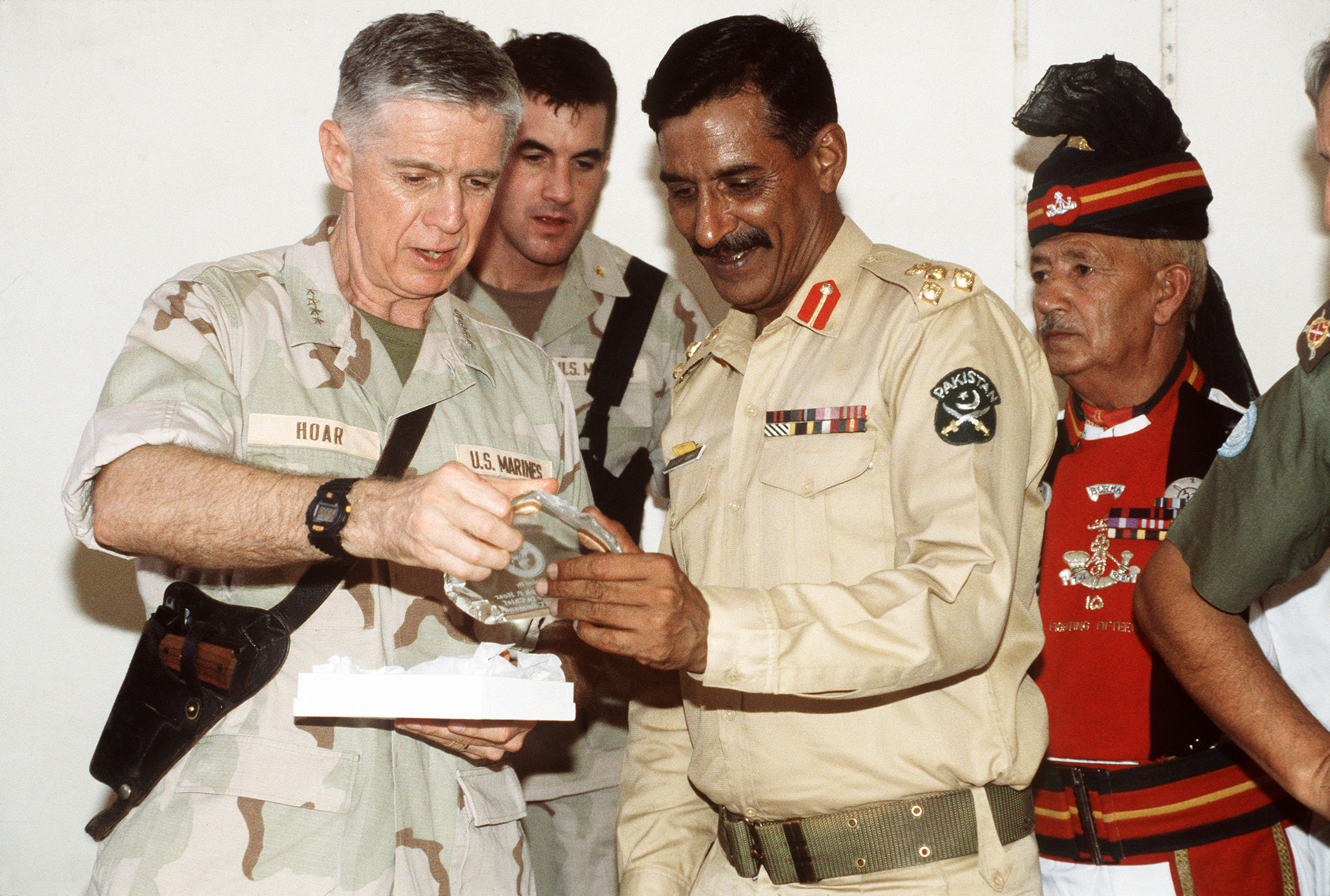
Standard yellowish khaki (on right) as both ACU and the ASU, 1994

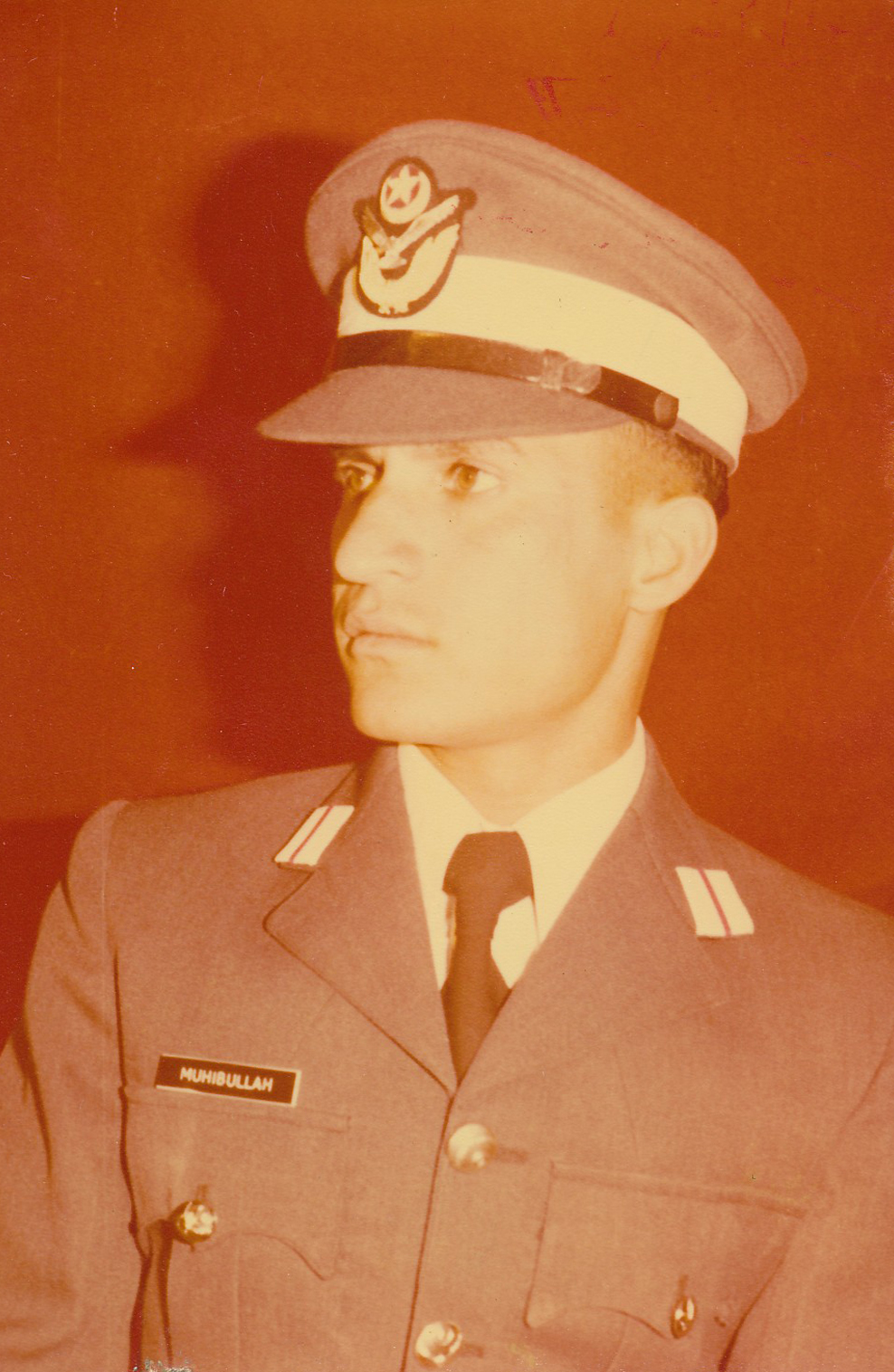
A Pakistan Air Force service uniform, 1974

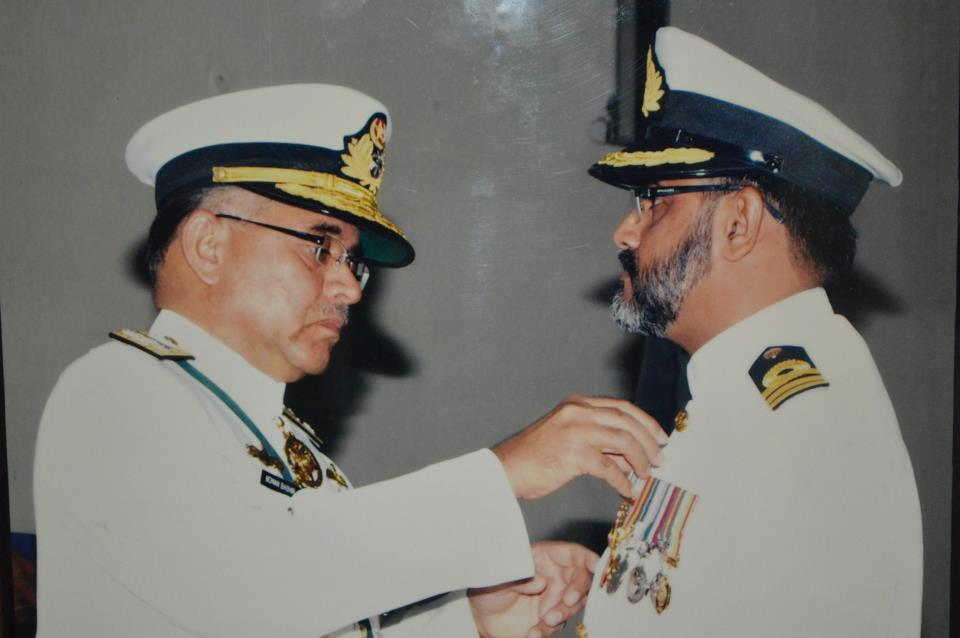
A traditional white navy service dress, 2008

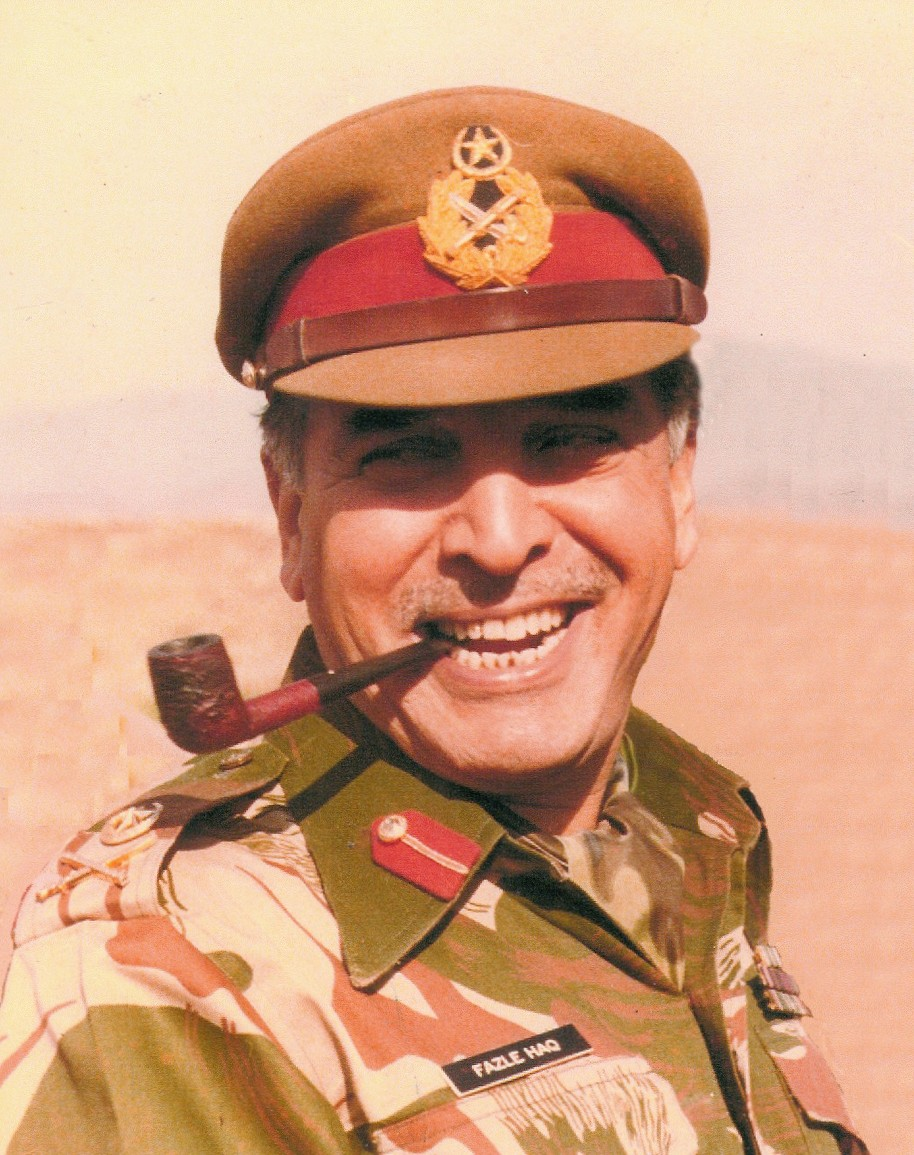
Earliest ACU in the 1980s

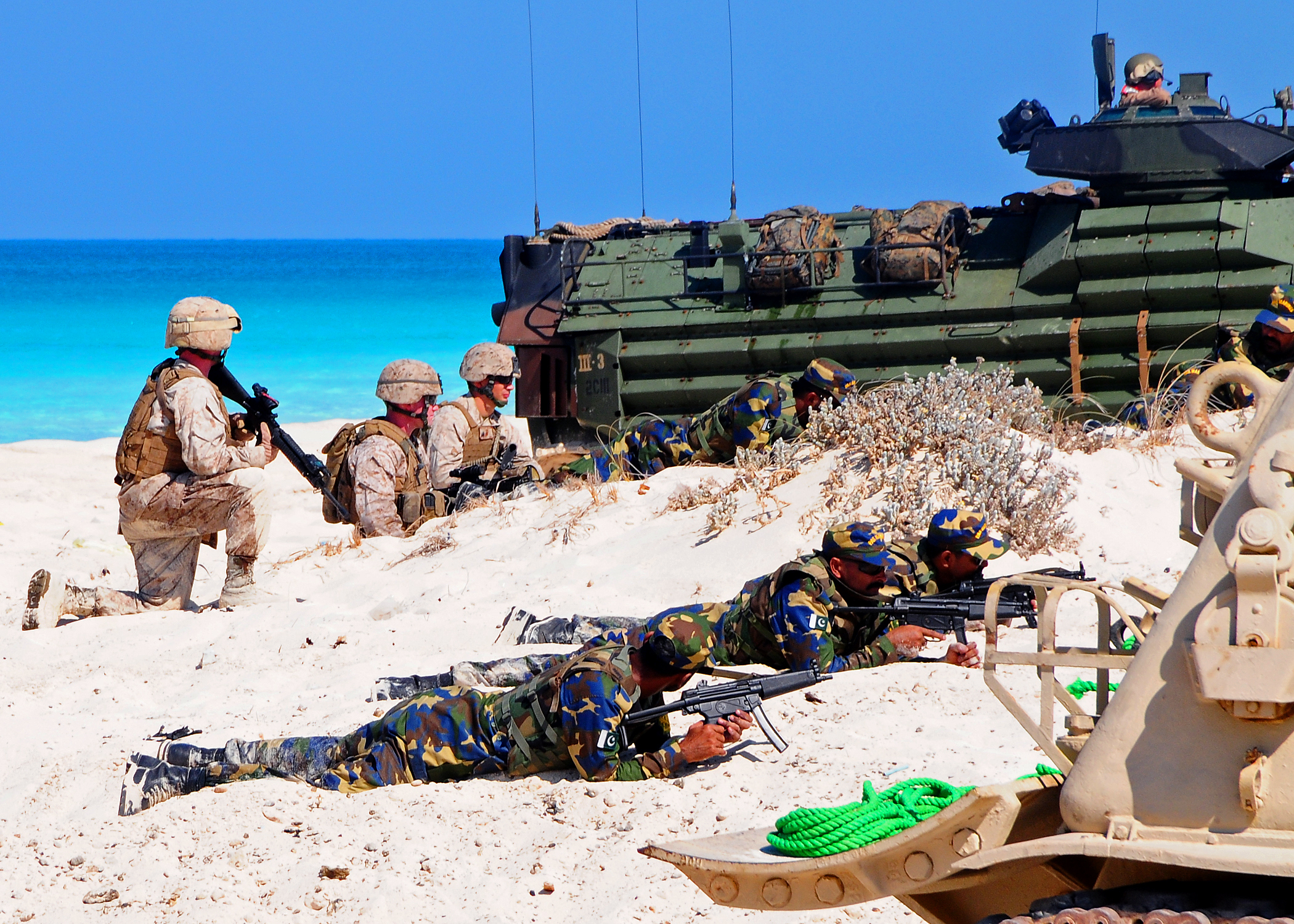
Marines (as laying down) standard UCP

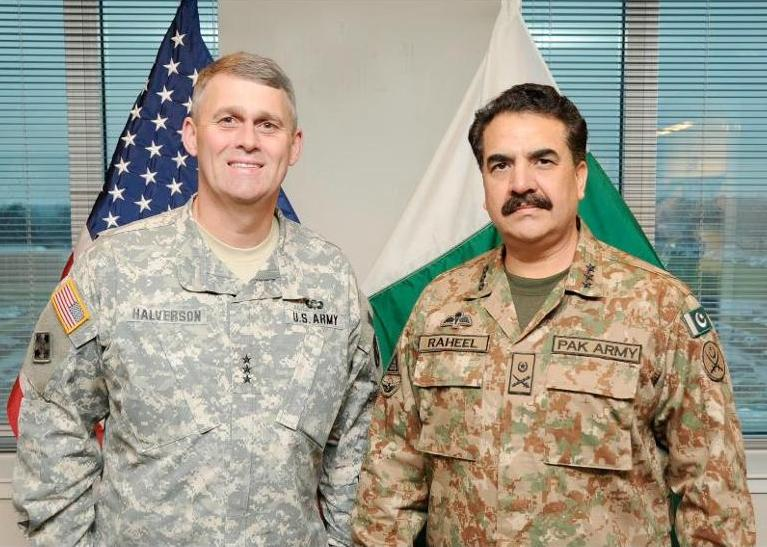
Comparison of US Army and Pakistan Army's UCP, 2013

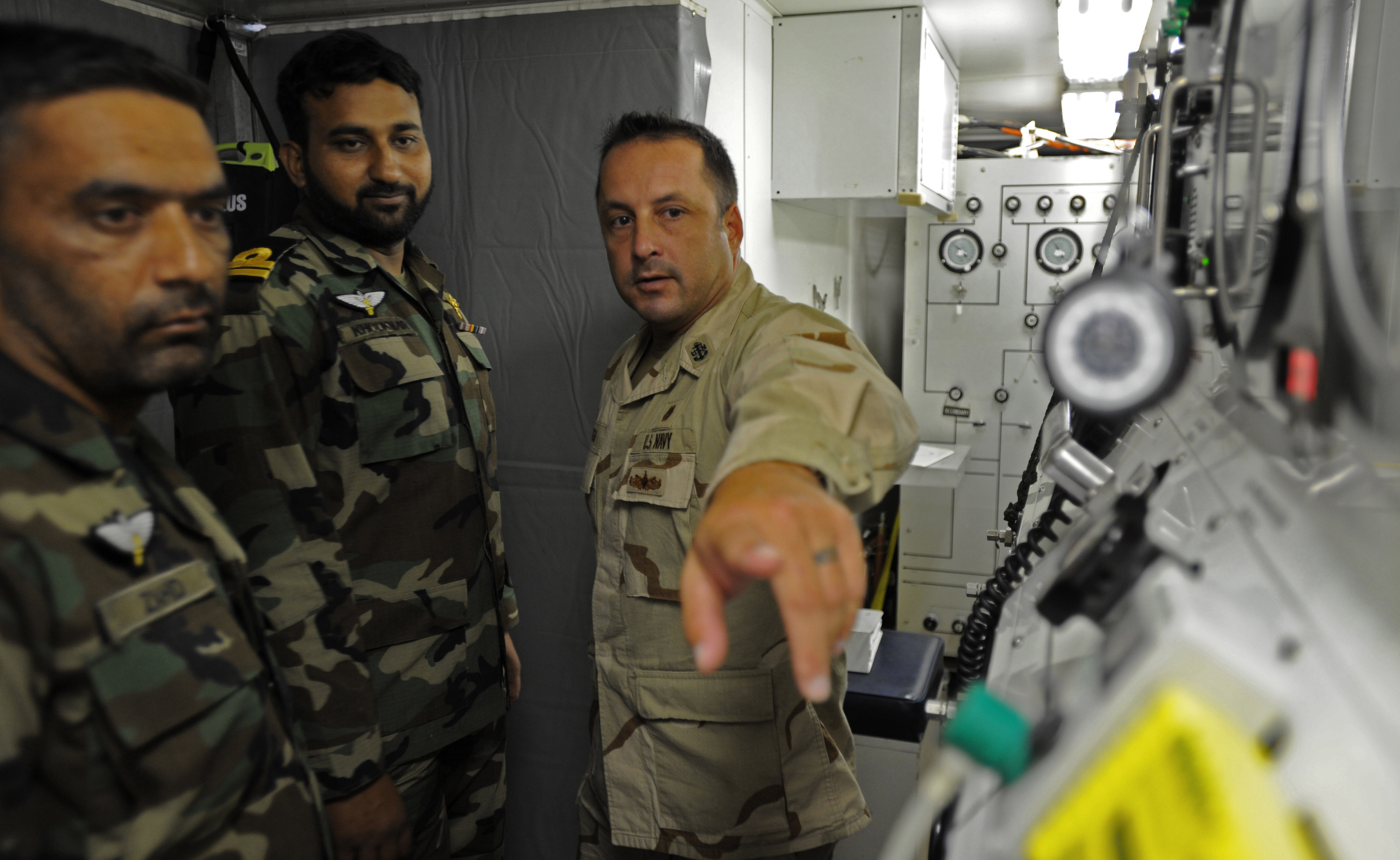
One of Pakistan Navy's previous UCPs in 2010. The Navy changed its camouflage in 2013.

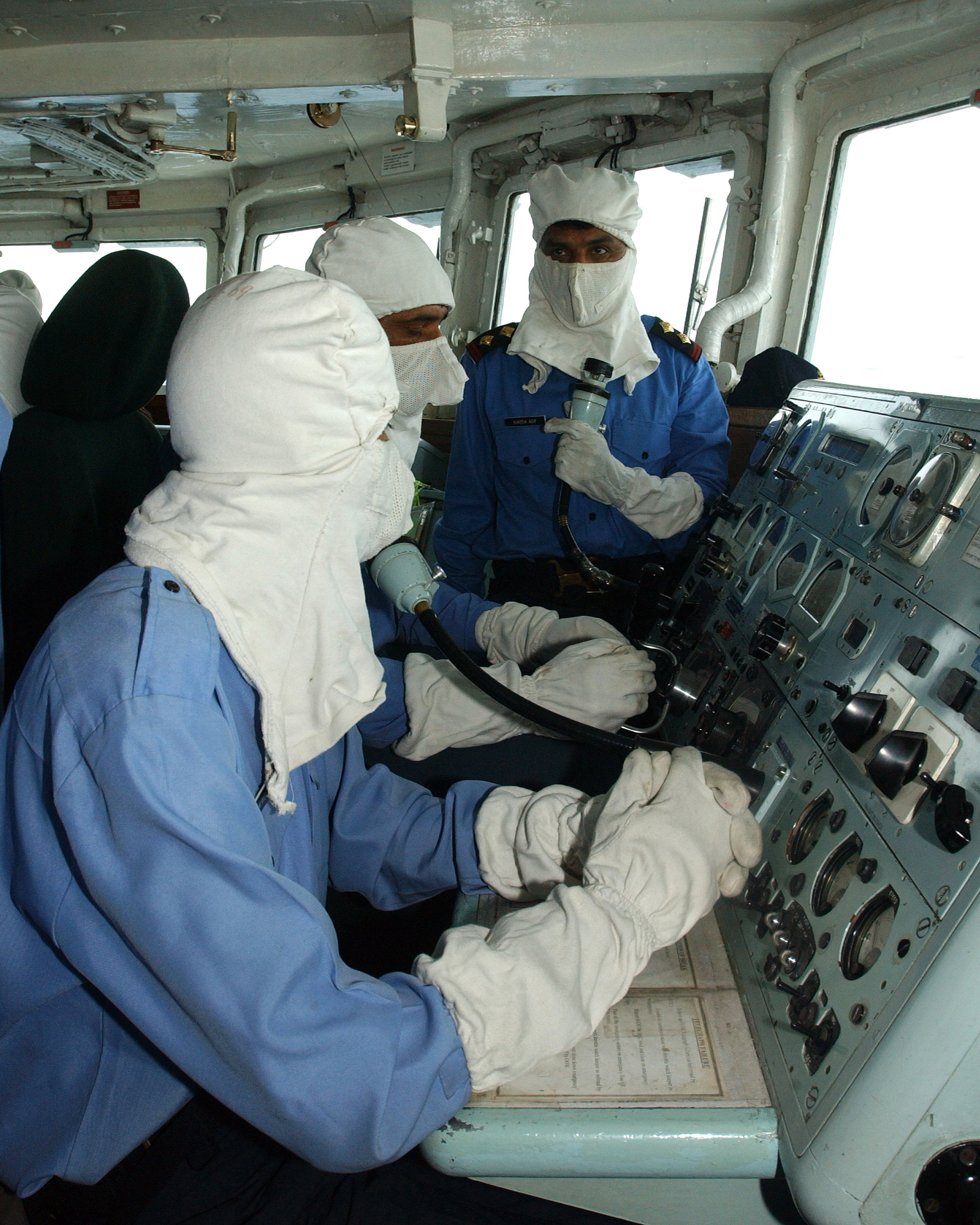
Pakistan Navy's sailors wearing anti-flash gear while operating a Guided missile frigate, PNS Alamgir

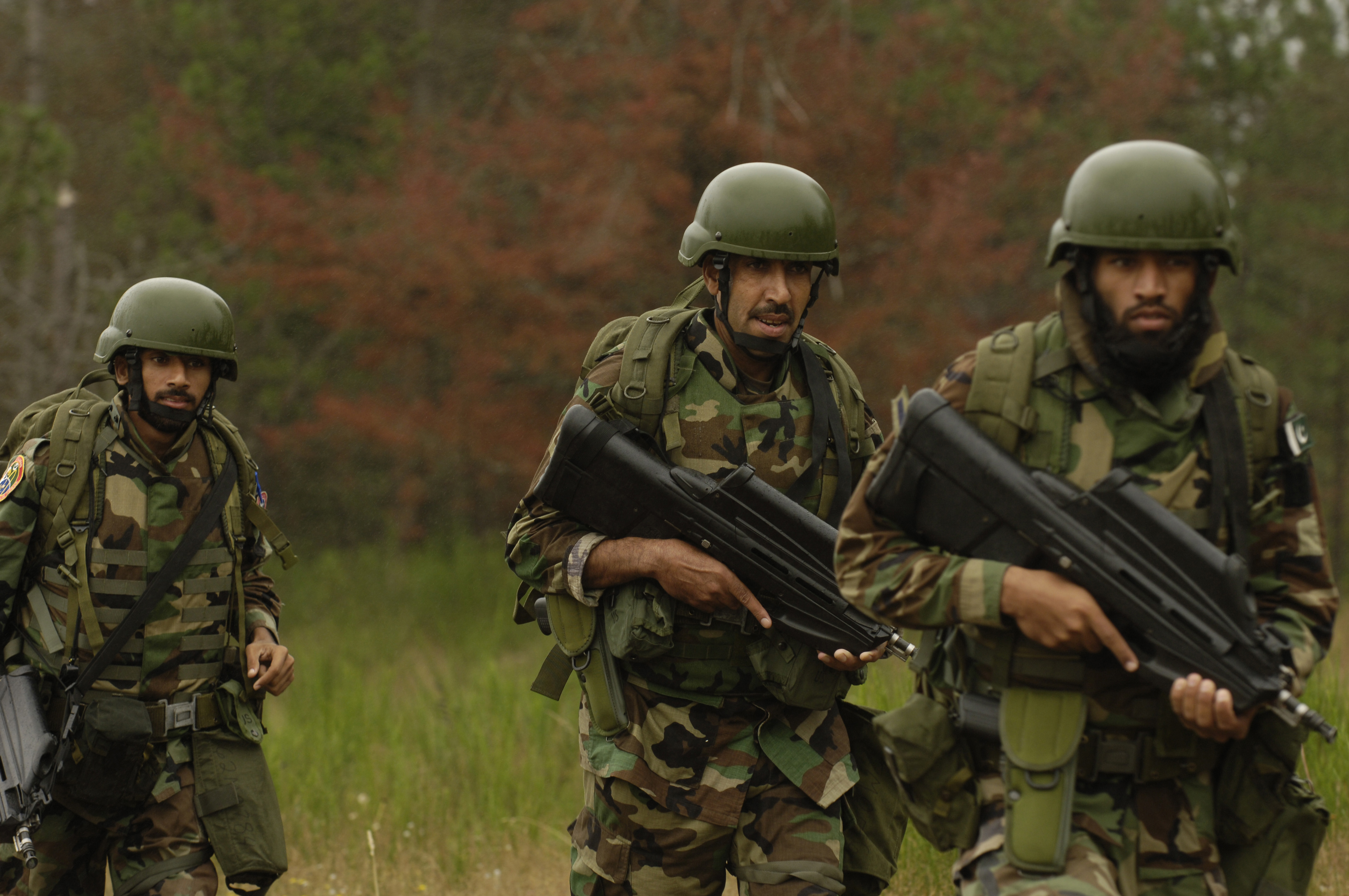
Pakistan Air Force's Special Service Wing (SSW) in its current camouflage

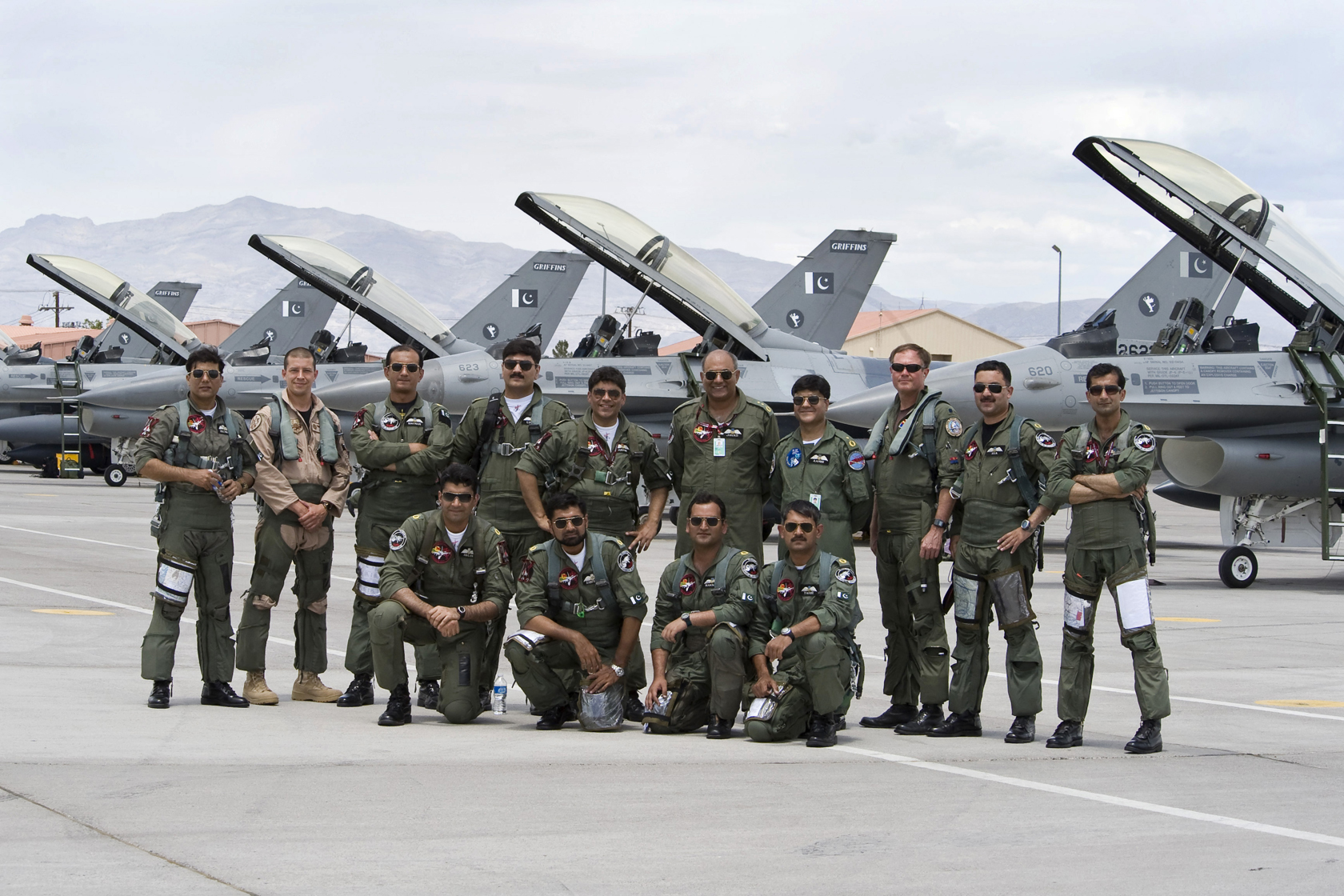
The PAF's fighter pilots with the greenish g-suit in comparison to USAF; the same pattern is used by the Pakistan Navy

Source: ISPR works, Commons

=== Rank and insignia structure ===
As Pakistan became independent, the British military ranks and insignia were initially commissioned by the armed forces as part of a legacy of British colonialism. Within a few months of its founding in 1947, the military had inherited all professional qualifications of the British military in India.

In respect to the British Indian military, the Ministry of Defence (MoD) authorised the three junior commissioned officer (JCO) pay grades between the enlisted ranks and commissioned officers. The JCO grades are equivalent to the civil bureaucracy's pay scales for those who rise by promotion from among enlisted recruits. The JCO grades in the Pakistani military are a continuation of the former Viceroy of India's commissioned pay grades during the British colonial period. Promotion to the JCO, however, remains a lucrative and powerful incentive for the enlisted military personnel; thus, if JCO ranks are ever phased out, it will probably be a slow process.

=== Deployments within Pakistan ===
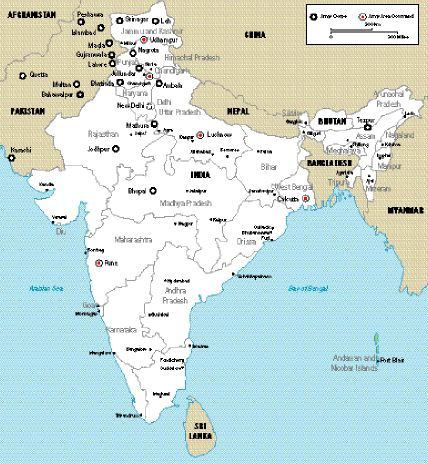
Approximately 70% of military forces are deployed near the eastern border with India, c. 1997.

It is estimated that approximately 60–70% of Pakistan's military personnel are deployed along the Indo-Pakistani border. In the aftermath of the United States invasion of Afghanistan, more than 150,000 personnel were shifted towards the Tribal Areas adjacent to Afghanistan. Since 2004, Pakistan's military forces have been engaged in military efforts against al-Qaeda extremists.

In comparison with multinational and US forces, Pakistan's military has suffered the highest number of casualties in the war on terror, both in confrontations with al-Qaeda and during border skirmishes with the United States. After the 2008 Mumbai attacks and the subsequent standoff with India, several combat divisions were redeployed to Eastern and Southern Pakistan.

In addition to its military deployments, the armed forces also assist the government in responding to natural disasters such as the 2005 Kashmir earthquake and the nationwide floods of 2010.

=== Overseas deployments ===
A large number of Pakistan Armed Forces personnel are deployed overseas as part of the United Nations' peacekeeping missions. As of May 2019, 5,083 personnel were serving abroad, making Pakistan the sixth-largest contributor of personnel to UN peacekeeping missions.

== Doctrine ==
=== New Concept of War Fighting ===
New Concept of War Fighting (NCWF) is a military doctrine of the Pakistani armed forces, integrating contributions from the army, air force, and navy. Inspired by India's Cold Start doctrine, NCWF focuses on enhancing operational efficiency, troop mobilisation, and inter-service co-ordination during Indo-Pak conflicts. Adopted in 2013, it emphasises independent missions and utilises advanced equipment like Babur cruise missiles and Harbah anti-ship missiles, following extensive military exercises.

=== Nuclear doctrine of Pakistan ===
Pakistan's Nuclear Doctrine centres on deterrence through a promise of "massive retaliation" against aggressors. It outlines four thresholds for nuclear weapon deployment during conflicts, particularly with India, where numerical superiority could threaten Pakistan's defence. In dire situations, where conventional means fail, Pakistan may resort to nuclear weapons as a stabilising response, potentially even as a first strike.

=== Full spectrum deterrence ===
Full Spectrum Deterrence (FSD), formerly Minimum Credible Deterrence (MCD), is Pakistan's primary nuclear strategy designed to deter Indian military actions by establishing a credible deterrent, without adopting a no-first-use policy. Initiated by Prime Minister Zulfikar Ali Bhutto to enhance Pakistan’s global standing, FSD emphasises scientific parity with India and consolidates domestic political support through institutions like the National Command Authority (NCA) and Joint Special Forces (JSF). Prime Minister Nawaz Sharif further defined this doctrine in 1999, asserting India as Pakistan's main nuclear adversary and advocating for second-strike capabilities to maintain stability.

=== Threat Matrix ===
The Threat Matrix is a comprehensive intelligence programme initiated in 2011 under Prime Minister Yousaf Raza Gillani, designed to assess both external and internal threats to Pakistan's national security. This database aids military and government officials in prioritising operational responses by detailing existential and non-existential risks. Positioned to become a key element of Pakistan's national security policy, it enhances strategic insights and readiness.

=== Bleed India with a Thousand Cuts ===
Bleed India with a Thousand Cuts is a covert military doctrine employed by the Pakistani military to undermine India through insurgency and asymmetric warfare. Originating from studies at Pakistan's Staff College, Quetta, this strategy has been elaborated by military experts, including insights from former ISI leadership.

=== Strategic depth ===
In the 1980s, General Mirza Aslam Beg of Pakistan's National Defence University introduced the concept of "strategic depth," promoting the idea that Pakistan should control Afghanistan. This strategy has been linked to Pakistan's support for specific Taliban factions. However, during the 2014–2015 military operations against domestic militants, Pakistani leaders denied any ongoing adherence to this policy.

== Foreign military relations ==
=== China ===
China's relationship with Pakistan holds great importance for both countries in terms of common interest and geopolitical strategy. The alliance was initially formed to counter the regional influence and military threat posed by India and the Soviet Union. In recent years, with the strategic co-operation between the United States and India has deepened further, China and Pakistan have signed several military co-operation agreements.

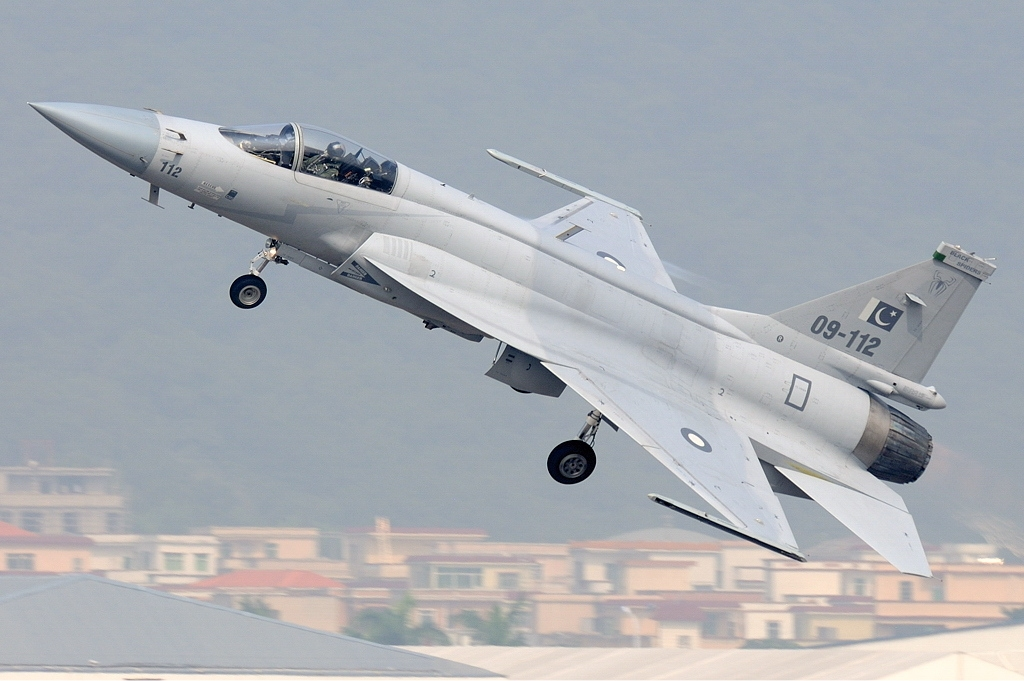
A PAC JF-17 taking off from Zhuhai Jinwan Airport, China

China has been a steady source of military equipment and has co-operated with Pakistan in setting-up weapons production and modernisation facilities. According to Stockholm International Peace Research Institute (SIPRI), Pakistan is China's biggest arms buyer, counting for nearly 63% of Chinese arms exports. According to SIPRI, 81% of Pakistan's arms imports between 2019 and 2024 came from China. The two countries are actively involved in several joint projects to enhance each other's military needs, including development and production of the JF-17 Thunder fighter jet, the K-8 Karakorum advanced training aircraft, the Al-Khalid tank, airborne early warning and control (AEW&C) systems, and many other projects. The two countries have held several joint military exercises to enhance co-operation between their armed forces. A 2023 report by the United States Institute of Peace argues that China and Pakistan's military relationship has "advanced from an episodic partnership to a threshold alliance", Pakistan "increasingly sourced from China, especially the higher-end combat strike and power projection capabilities; and Pakistan continues to retire older U.S. and European origin platforms". But both sides need to do more to make this threshold relationship a full-fledged ally.

=== Other Asian countries ===
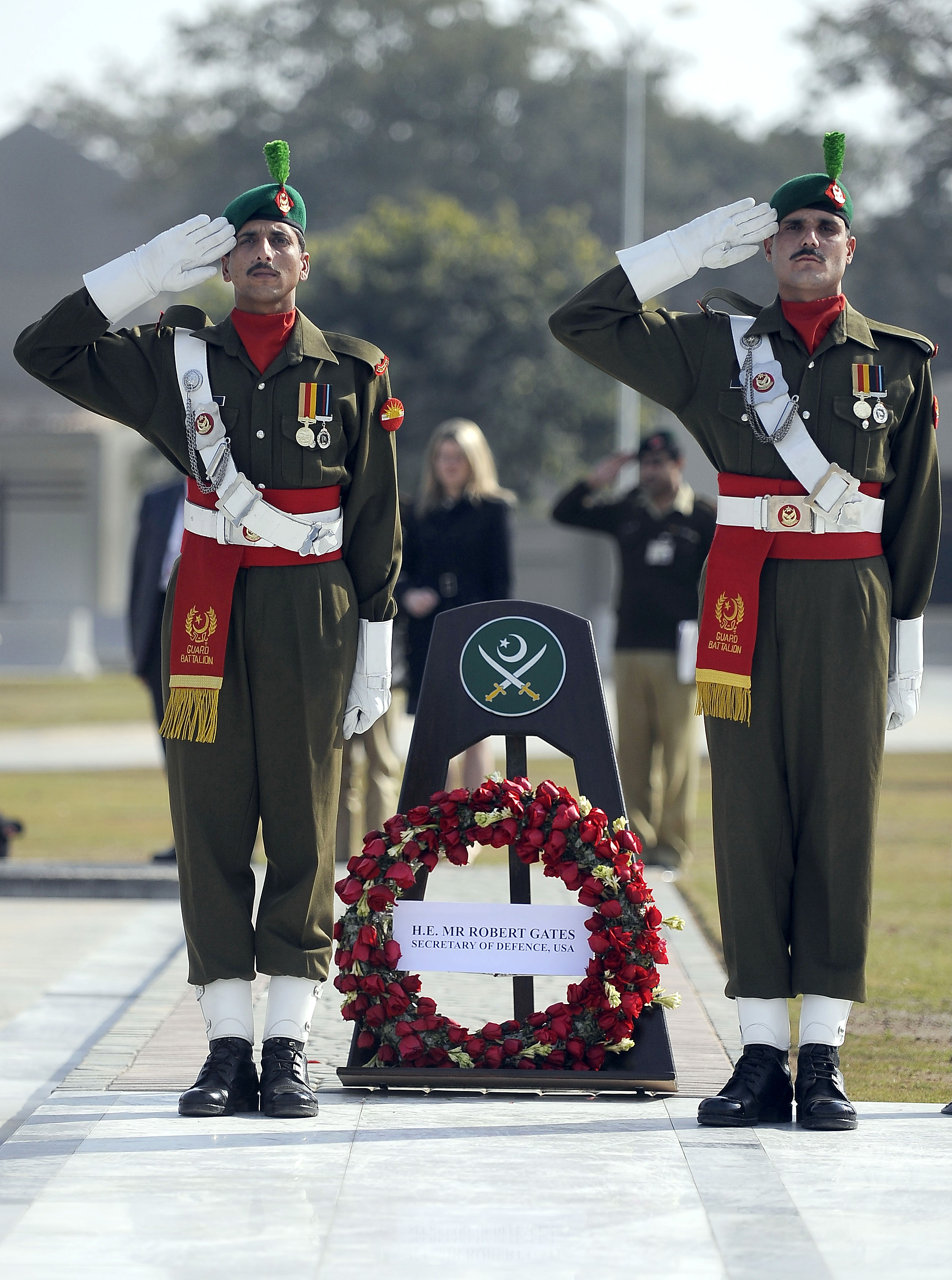
Pakistan Army personnel saluting in British-style, palms facing outward, to American Defence Secretary Robert Gates in 2010

Prior to 1971, Pakistan's military had a strong presence in East Pakistan and an active theatre-level military command. After Bangladesh's independence from Pakistan, full diplomatic relations were not restored until 1976. Relations improved considerably under the Bangladesh military governments of President Lieutenant General Ziaur Rahman and Lieutenant General Hussain Muhammad Ershad, as Bangladesh had grown distant from its former war ally, India. Common concerns over India's regional power have influenced strategic co-operation, leading to a gift of several squadrons of F-6 fighter aircraft to the Bangladesh Air Force in the late 1980s.

After being condemned by India, Great Britain, and the United States between 2004 and 2006 for repressing democracy, the Nepalese monarchy developed military ties with China and Pakistan, who offered extensive support, arms, and equipment for the monarchy's struggle to stay in power in the face of a Maoist insurgency.

When India proved reluctant to supply Sri Lanka with weapons, the insurgency-plagued island nation turned to Pakistan. In May 2000, with separatist Tamil Tiger rebels about to recapture their former capital of Jaffna, Pakistan President Musharraf provided millions of dollars of much-needed armament to the Sri Lankan government. In May 2008, Lt-Gen Fonseka of the Sri Lanka Army held talks with his Pakistan Army counterparts regarding the sale of military equipment, weapons, and ammunition. The sale of 22 Al-Khalid main battle tanks to the Sri Lanka Army was finalised during these talks, in a deal worth over US$100million. In April 2009, Sri Lanka requested $25million worth of 81mm, 120mm and 130mm mortar ammunition, to be delivered within a month, which proved decisive in the defeat of the Tamil Tigers.

Since the 1970s, Pakistan and North Korea have co-operated extensively on the development of ballistic missile and nuclear weapons technologies. Pakistan's strong alliance with China and the legacy of a major scandal linking the Pakistani military to North Korea's nuclear programme have prevented Islamabad from joining UN efforts to diplomatically isolate the DPRK.

=== NATO states and Russia ===
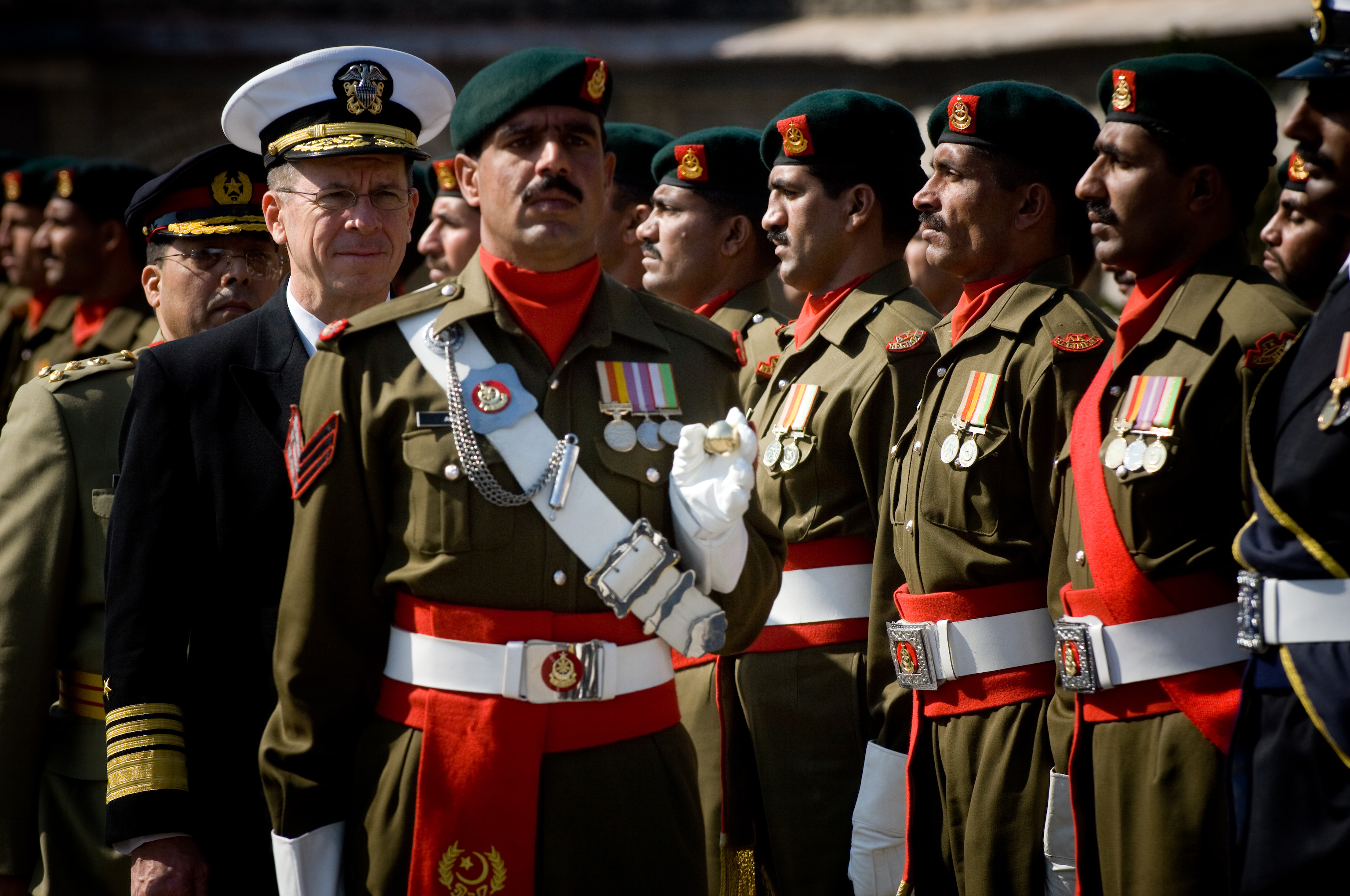
American Chairman of Joint Chiefs Admiral Mike Mullen reviews Pakistani troops during a ceremony honouring Mullen's arrival in Islamabad in 2008.

Throughout its history, Pakistan has had a fluctuating military relationship with the United States. During times of co-operation, US military funding and training have enhanced the Pakistan Armed Forces; in contrast, severing of US support at critical junctures has led to bitter disillusionment. The Pakistani military, which generally prefers a balance with China or America, is not ready to sever ties with the United States, despite leaked Pentagon intelligence suggesting that Pakistani diplomats are negative about ties with it.

In support of the United States' 2001 invasion of Afghanistan, Pakistan's armed forces received large amounts of military aid, funding, and training. According to Ministry of Finance calculations, in the three years prior to the 11 September attacks, Pakistan received approximately $9 million in American military aid; in the three years after, the amount increased to $4.2 billion.

Pakistan has maintained military-to-military relations with the 30 member states of the North Atlantic Treaty Organization (NATO). NATO regards its relations with Pakistan as "partners across the globe." With the support of US Secretary of State Colin Powell, Pakistan was designated a "major non-NATO ally" in 2004. However, after the United States troops withdraws Afghanistan in 2021, US "clearly distanced" itself from Pakistan, and all US military aid has been cancelled.

Since the 2000s, military relations have improved between the Russian armed forces and the Pakistan armed forces. Russia and Pakistan have held Joint Tactical Exercise Friendship since 2016.

=== Middle Eastern countries ===
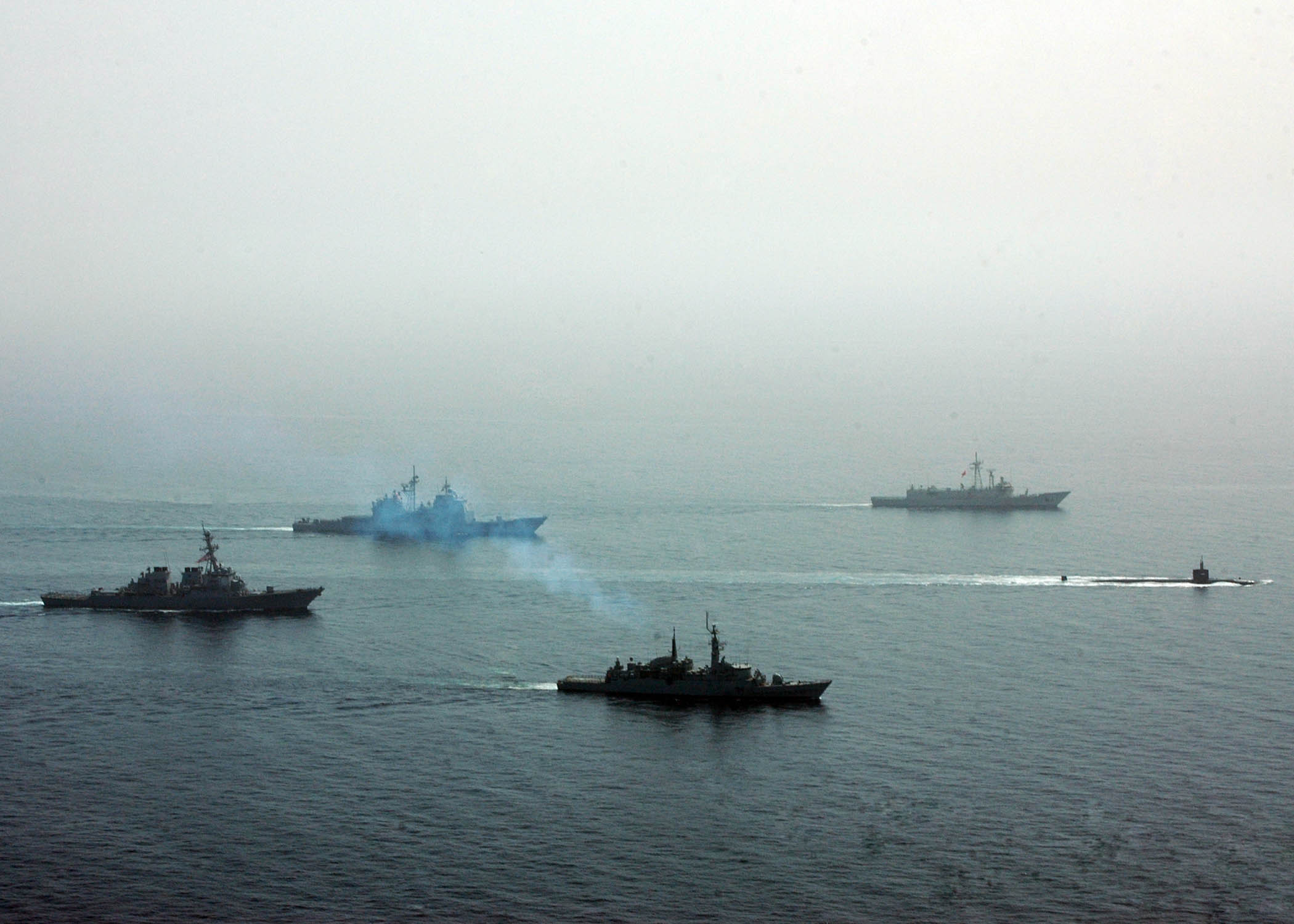
Pakistan Navy ships deployed in the Arabian Sea, near Oman

Pakistan's close ties to the nations of the Middle East, based on geography and shared religion, have led to periodic military deployments since the 1960s. The Arab world countries – many of them wealthy but with small populations and limited militaries – have historically depended on regional armies to provide a protective umbrella and military muscle in times of instability and crisis. The Pakistani military has retained a particularly close relationship with Saudi Arabia which has been a sporadically generous patron: much of the military equipment bought from the United States by Pakistan in the 1980s was paid for by Saudi Arabia. The United Arab Emirates (UAE) and Kuwait also have been important sources of financial support.

Pakistani military personnel have been posted as military advisers and instructors to the militaries of Saudi Arabia, Jordan, Syria, Libya, Kuwait, and the UAE. Pakistan Air Force, Navy, and Army personnel played crucial roles in building the UAE military. Many Arab military officials have been educated at Pakistan's military staff colleges and universities. A combat division commanded by Major-General Zia-ul-Haq was instrumental in putting down the Palestinian Black September revolt against King Hussein in Jordan in the early 1970s.

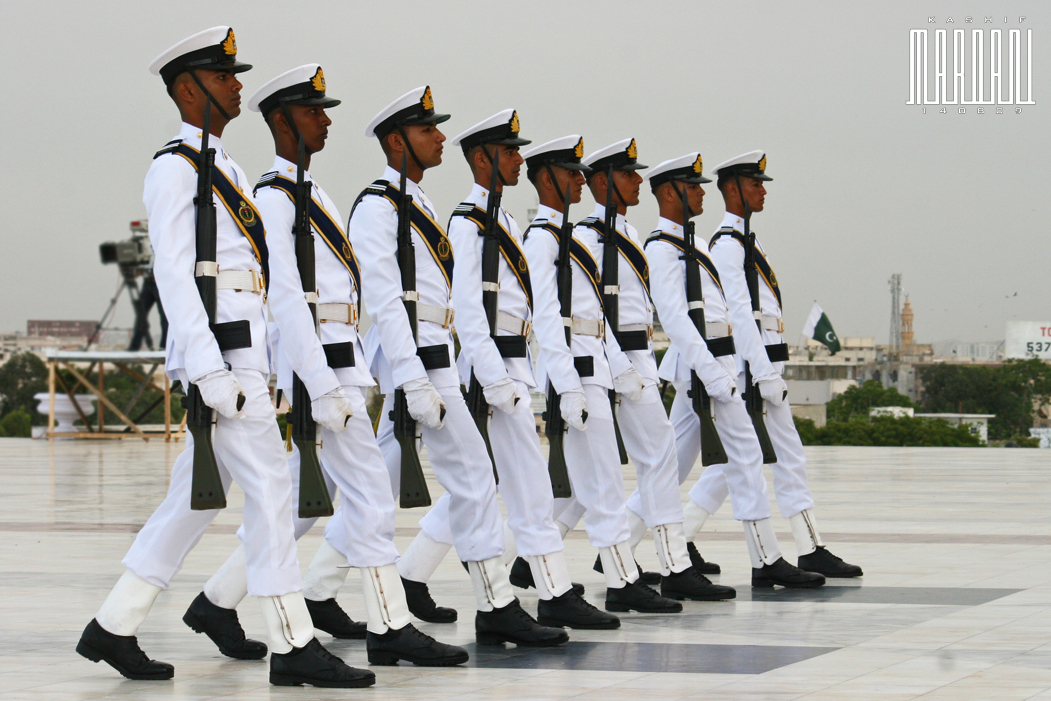
Navy guards marching in 2009

Pakistan has enjoyed strong military co-operation with the Iranian military since the 1950s. Iranian leader Mohammad Reza Shah provided free fuel to PAF fighter jets in the Indo-Pakistani War of 1965, allowing Pakistani planes to land at Iranian Air Force bases, refuel, and take off. The military relationship continued even after the Iranian revolution, as Pakistan was among the first countries to recognise the new Iranian government. In the aftermath of the hostage crisis in Tehran, the United States severed its ties with Iran, leading Iran to send its military officers and personnel to be educated at Pakistani military academies. Relations became difficult following the Soviet–Afghan War, when hundreds of foreign fighters (mostly Sunni Arabs) arrived in Pakistan to take part in the Afghan Jihad. Pakistan President Zia-ul-Haq's military administration policy reflected extremist views towards the Shiites and caused religious tensions to rise between Sunni and Shiites in Pakistan, much to the discomfort of Iran. During the Iran–Iraq War, the Arab countries and the United States, who were supporting Iraq, pressured Pakistan to discontinue its covert support and military funding for Iran.

The 1980s were a difficult time in military relations for both countries, as Iran was blamed for the rising ethnic tensions between Sunnis and Shiites in Pakistan. The relationship further deteriorated in the 1990s when the Taliban, with Pakistan's support, began their rule of Afghanistan. In 1998, Iran and Afghanistan were on the verge of war over the assassination of Iranian diplomats. Iran's relations with India improved during this time, with both supporting the Northern Alliance against the Taliban.

The situation began to normalise in 2000, with Pakistan and Iran reinstating trade relations. In the wake of the 11 September attacks in the United States and the fall of the Taliban government in Afghanistan, the two countries began rebuilding their military ties. Over the years, diplomatic delegations have been exchanged, and Pakistan has agreed to sell military equipment to Iran. In addition, Pakistan has maintained strong military-to-military ties with Turkey, and would like to use these, as well as its Iranian connections, as a bridge to the new Muslim states of Central Asia.

Bilateral relations deteriorated after Pakistan refused to participate in the Saudi-led intervention in Yemen, but it subsequently participated in the "Islamic Military Counter Terrorism Coalition" (IMCTC) alliance in 2015.

== Special operations forces ==
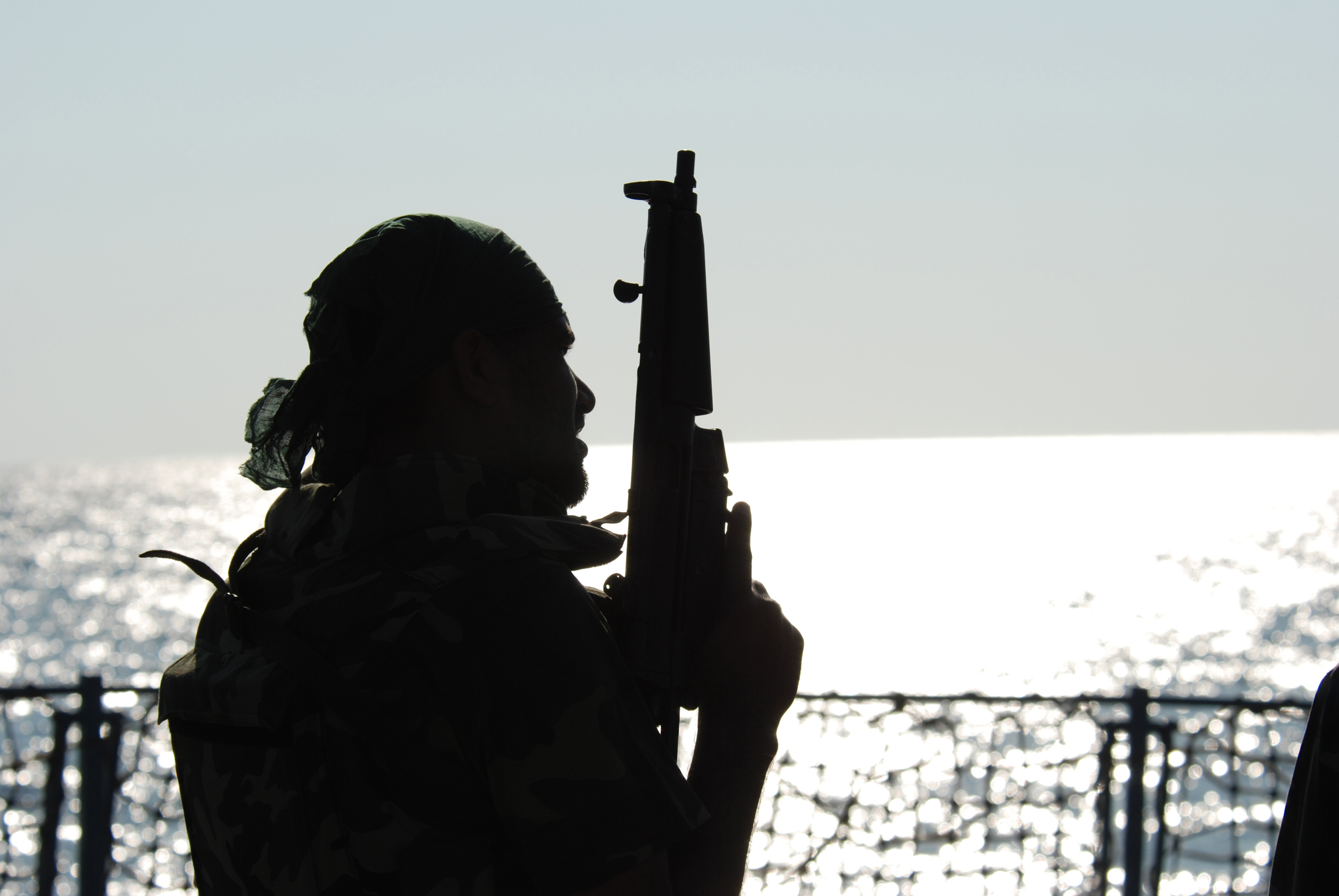
A member of Pakistan Navy Special Service Group aboard Pakistan Navy Ship PNS Babur

After the Indo-Pakistani War of 1947, recommendations for establishing an elite commando division within the army were accepted. Commissioned in 1956 with help from US Army Special Forces, the Pakistan Army's Special Services Group (SSG) is an elite special operations division; its training and nature of operations are roughly equivalent to British Special Air Service (SAS) and US Army Special Forces and Delta Force. Tentative estimates of the division's size are put at four battalions but the actual strength is kept highly classified.

With the successful commissioning of Special Services Group, the Pakistan Navy accepted recommendations for commissioning its own special operational unit shortly after the Indo-Pakistani War of 1965. Established as Special Service Group Navy (SSGN) in 1966, it is an elite and secretive commando division whose training and combat operations are similar to the Royal Navy's Special Boat Service and US Navy's Special Warfare Development Group (DEVGRU) and Sea, Air, Land (SEAL) teams. Operatives' identities and actual static strength are kept secret and classified. Very few details of their missions are publicly known.

A small unit of Pakistan Marines have, since 1990, operated reconnaissance units to deter the Indian Army's actions in the Sir Creek region. Other battalions of Marines are trained to carry out operations with airborne, heliborne, submarine, and waterborne insertions and extractions.

The Special Service Wing (SSW) is the newest special operations force, re-established by the Pakistan Air Force in 2004, in the wake of challenges posed by the Afghanistan war. The unit was active earlier by the name of Special Air Warfare Wing and had seen action during the Indo-Pakistani War of 1965 and 1971. The SSW is designed to execute difficult aerial and land operations, serving as equivalent to the US Air Force's Special Tactics Squadron units. Following the secretive tradition of its counterparts in other services, the actual number of its serving personnel is kept classified.

== UN peacekeeping forces ==
In 2009, Pakistan was the single largest contributor of UN peacekeeping forces, with more than 11,000 Pakistani military personnel serving in UN peacekeeping operations worldwide.

The table below shows the current deployment of Pakistani Forces in UN Peacekeeping missions.

Start of operation	Name of operation	Location		Conflict	Contribution
1999	United Nations Organization Mission in the Democratic Republic of the Congo (MONUC)	(Democratic Republic of the Congo)	Democratic Republic of Congo	Second Congo War	3,556 Troops.
2003	United Nations Mission in Liberia (UNMIL)	(Liberia)	Liberia	Second Liberian Civil War	2,741 Troops.
2004	United Nations Operation in Burundi ONUB	(Burundi)	Burundi	Burundi Civil War	1,185 Troops.
2004	United Nations Operation in Côte d'Ivoire (UNOCI)	(Ivory Coast)	Ivory Coast	First Ivorian Civil War	1,145 Troops.
2005	United Nations Mission in the Sudan (UNMIS)	(Sudan)	Sudan	Second Sudanese Civil War	1,542 Troops.
	Staff/observers				191 observers.

- The total number of troops serving in peacekeeping missions was 10,173 as of March 2007.

== Defence industry ==
At the time of the creation of Pakistan, the country had virtually no military industry or production capability. In 1949–50, the contribution of the industrial sector to the GNP was only 5.8%, of which 4.8% was attributed to small-scale industries. The new nation's only major heavy-industry operation was the Karachi Shipyard and Engineering Works (KSEW), which was focused on civil maritime construction. All military industrial materials and weapons systems were either inherited or purchased from the United Kingdom.

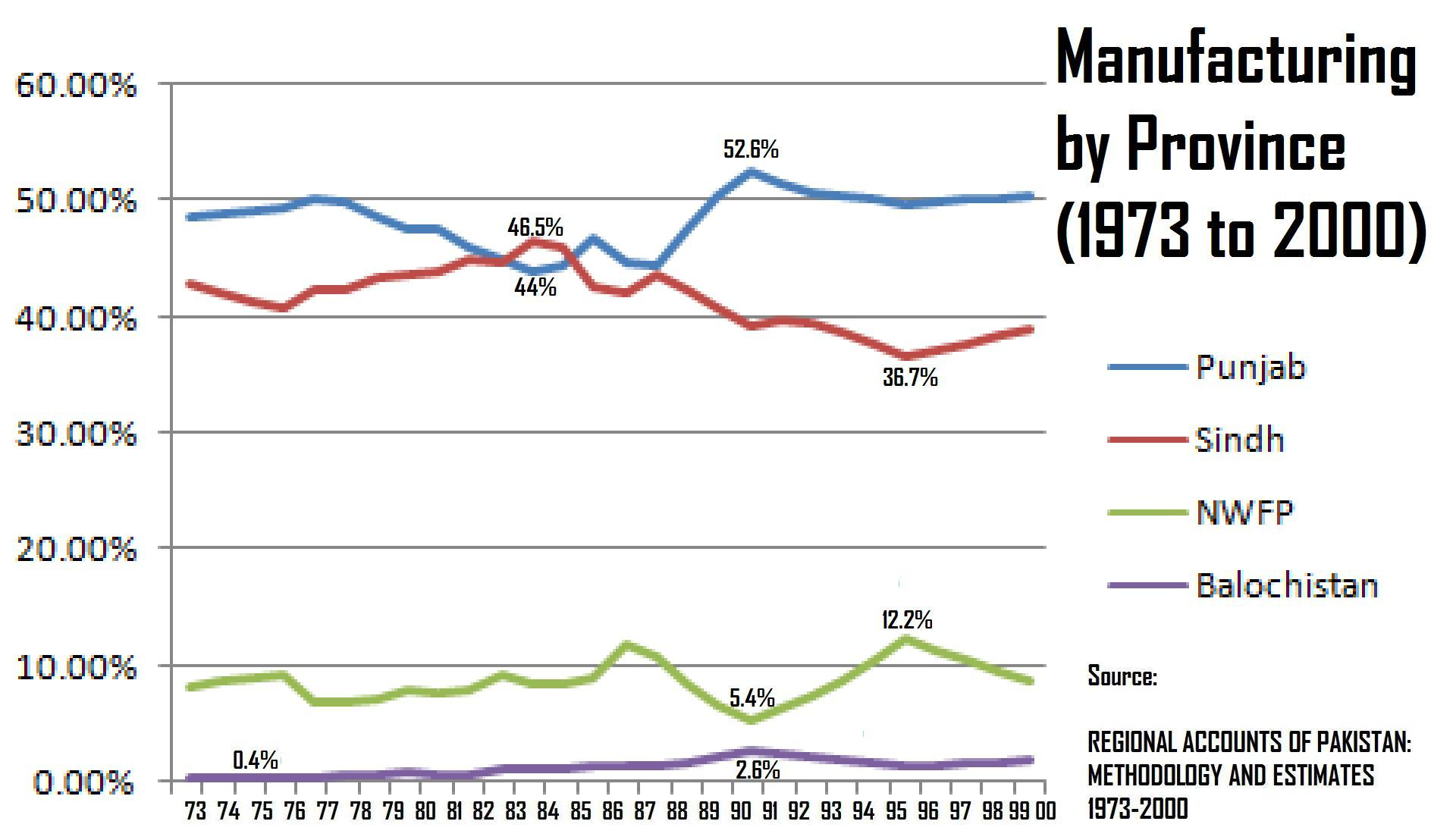
Industrial manufacturing in Pakistan from 1973 to 2000

By 1951, Prime Minister Liaquat Ali Khan had established the Pakistan Ordnance Factory (POF) in Wah Military District, with a civilian chemist, Dr. Abdul Hafeez, serving as director and senior scientist. The POF was oriented towards the production of small arms, ammunition, and chemical explosives. During the period of reliance on United States supply, from 1955 to 1964, there was little attention given to domestic production. Almost all military weapons and equipment were provided by the United States, as part of Pakistan's membership in South East Asian Treaty Organization (SEATO) and Central Treaty Organization (CENTO). By 1963, the Defence Science and Technology Organization (DESTO) was formed by POF Director Hafeez for the purposes of military research and development. After US military assistance was cut off in the Indo-Pakistani War of 1965 (followed by the disastrous 1971 War), Pakistan turned to China for help in expanding its military industrial and production capabilities, including the modernisation of the facilities at Wah.

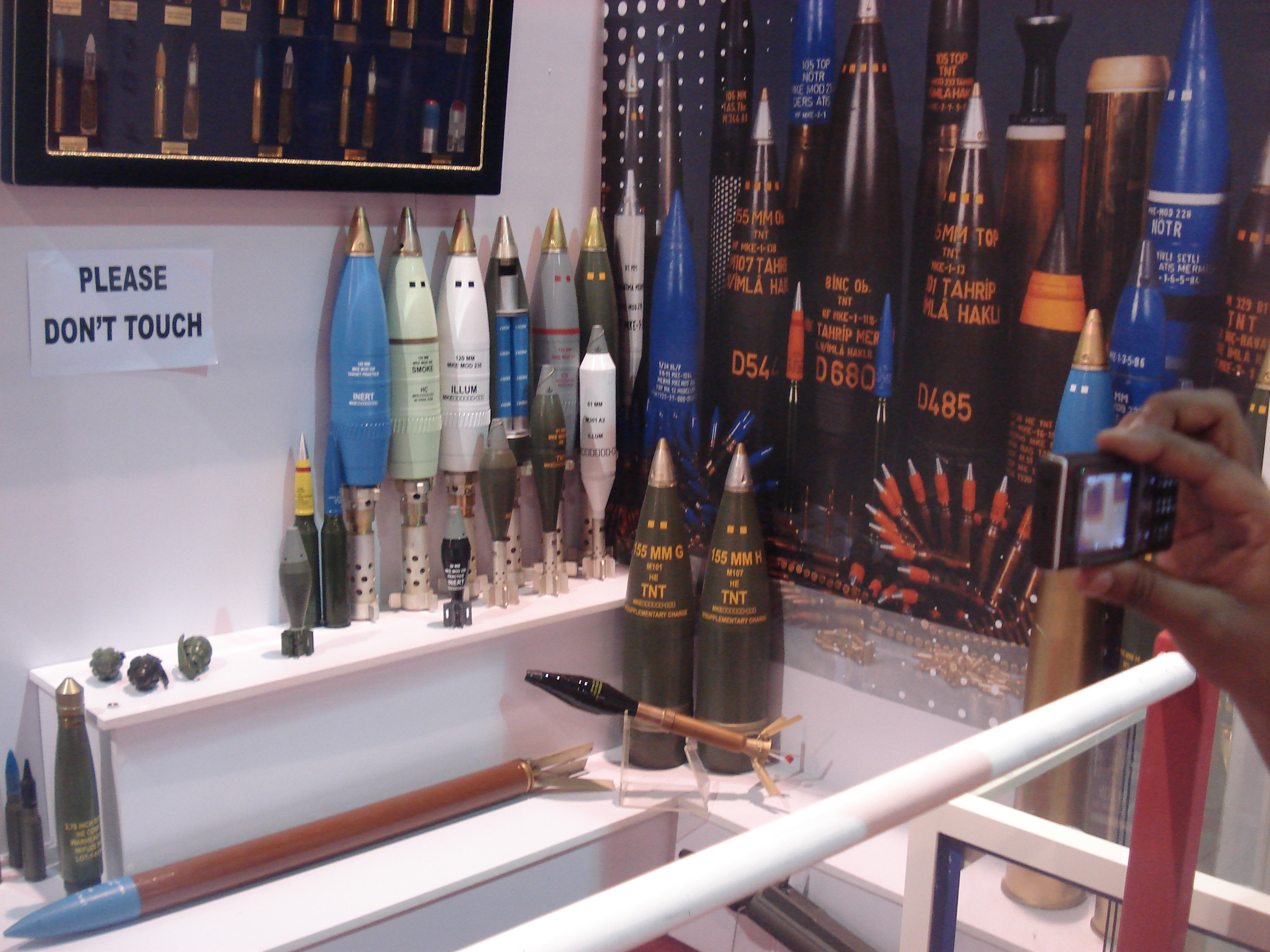
Chemical explosives and shells produced by AWC, DESTO, and POF used by the Pakistani military

During the Indo-Pakistani War of 1971, the US Congress scrutinised its military aid to Pakistan despite efforts by US President Richard Nixon. After the war, programmes on self-reliance and domestic production were launched with the establishment of the Ministry of Defence Production (MoDP) in 1972, aiming to promote and co-ordinate the patchwork of military production facilities which had developed since independence. New military policy oversaw the establishment of Heavy Industries Taxila (HIT) in Taxila and the Pakistan Aeronautical Complex (PAC) in Kamra, north of Islamabad. The militarisation of the Karachi Shipyard Engineering Works (KSEW) took place the same year. The PAC reverse-engineered several F–6J, F–7P, Mirage III, and Mirage 5 fighter jets (of the Chinese and French), built the Mushshak trainer (based on the Swedish SAAB Safari), and maintained radar and avionics equipment. After the success of the Mushshak, the Super Mushshak and the state-of-art Karakoram-8 advanced training jet were produced. The MoDP includes several other specialised organisations devoted to research and development, production and administration.

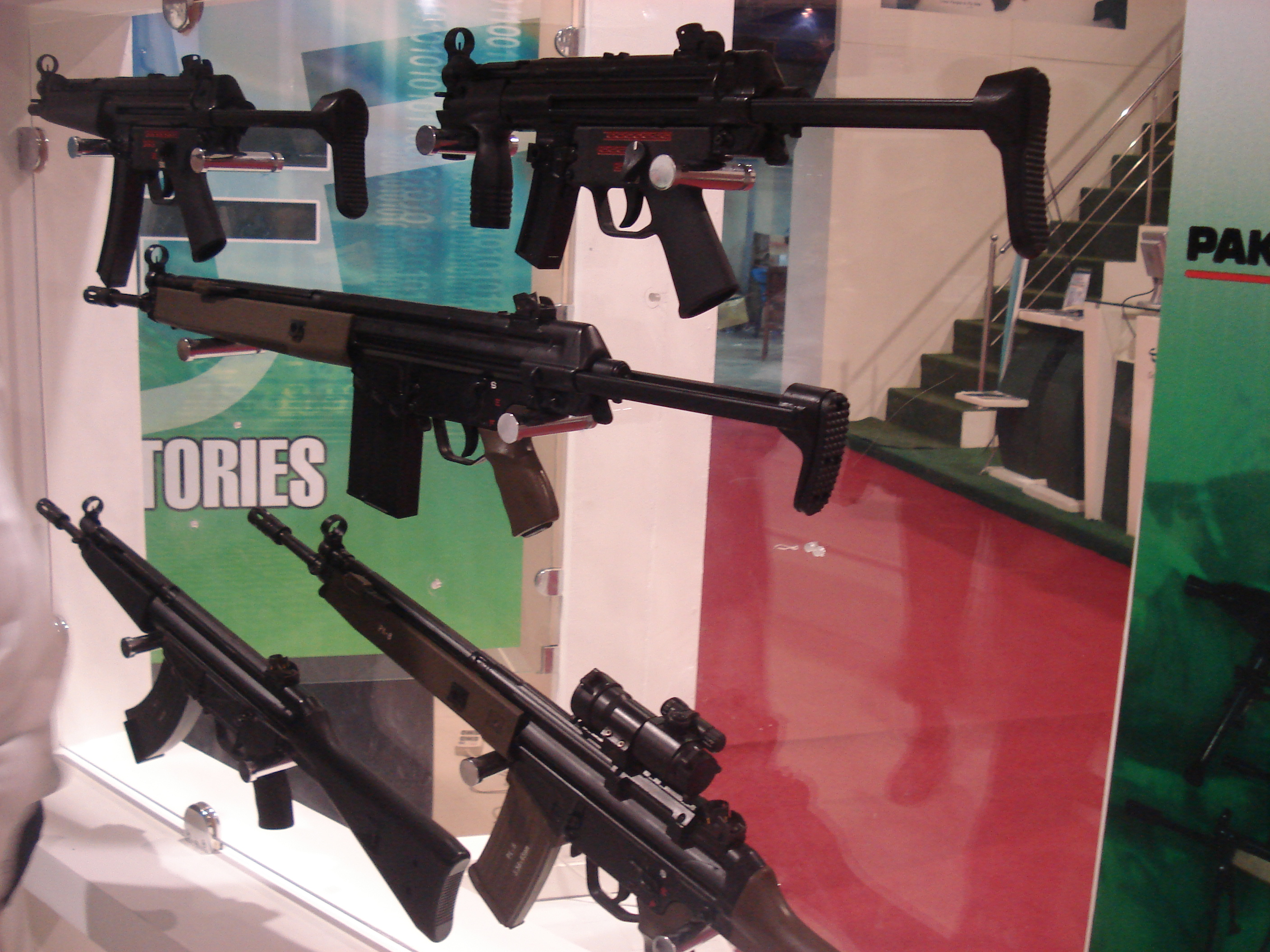
Rifles and firearms produced by POF displayed at an arms exhibition

In 1987, the KSEW began developing submarine technology and rebuilding the submarine base near Port Qasim. In the 1990s, concerns over Pakistan's secretive development of nuclear weapons led to the "Pressler amendment" (introduced by US Senator Larry Pressler) and an economic and military embargo. This caused a great panic in the Pakistan Armed Forces and each major service branch launched its own military-industrial programmes.

By 1999, the KSEW had built its first long-range attack submarine, the Agosta 90B, which featured air-independent propulsion (AIP) technology purchased from France in 1995. By early 2000, a joint venture with China led to the introduction of the JF-17 fighter jet (developed at PAC) and the Al-Khalid main battle tank, built and assembled at HIT. Since 2001, Pakistan has taken major steps toward becoming self-sufficient in aircraft overhaul and modernisation and tank and helicopter sales.

After the success of its major projects in the defence industry, the Defence Export Promotion Organization (DEPO) was created to promote Pakistani defence equipment to the world by hosting the International Defence Exhibition and Seminar (IDEAS), which is held biennially at the Karachi Expo Center. Pakistan's defence exports were reportedly worth over US $200million in 2006, and have continued to grow since.

== Defence Intelligence ==
Traditionally, the bulk of intelligence work in Pakistan has been carried out by the Inter-Services Intelligence (ISI), Intelligence Bureau (IB), Military Intelligence (MI) and the Federal Investigation Agency (FIA) as well as the others in the Pakistani intelligence community. To provide better co-ordination and eliminate competition, the National Intelligence Co-ordination Committee was established in 2020.

== Budget ==
GDP rate of growth 1951–2009

Faced with defence and security issues involving much larger opponents on both its eastern and western borders, the Ministry of Defence and Ministry of Finance require a disproportionate share of the nation's resources to maintain even a minimally effective defensive stance. Since 1971, the military budget of the armed forces grew by 200% in support of armed forces contingency operations. During the administrations of Prime Ministers Benazir Bhutto and Nawaz Sharif, approximately 50–60% of scientific research and funding went to military efforts.

In 1993, Benazir Bhutto's defence budget for the year was set at PKR 94 billion (US$3.3 billion), which represented 27% of the government's circular spending and 8.9% of GDP, in calculations shown by the United States military. Despite criticism from the country's influential political-science sphere, the government increased the military budget by an additional 11% for the fiscal year 2015–16.

During the 2024–25 fiscal year, while IMF-imposed austerity measures placed increased economic pressure on the general population, Pakistan's defence budget remained unaffected. Defence spending rose to approximately PKR 2.13 trillion, including an 11 per cent year-on-year increase in military salaries and pensions. In comparison, allocations for essential public services remained significantly lower, with education receiving only 2 per cent of GDP and healthcare 1.3 per cent, reflecting a continued prioritisation of defence over social sectors despite broader economic hardships. In June 2025, following a military confrontation with India, Pakistan increased its defence spending by over 20 per cent—the largest hike in a decade. The federal budget allocated 2.55 trillion rupees (approximately $9 billion) to the armed forces, representing 1.97 per cent of the country's GDP, up from 1.7 per cent in the previous fiscal year. This marked a significant rise in military expenditure, nearly doubling from the 1.28 trillion rupees allocated in the 2020–21 fiscal year.

== Nuclear weapons ==
Pakistan's development of nuclear weapons began in 1972, following the Indo-Pakistani War of 1971, with the government adopting a policy of deliberate ambiguity which was practised and observed from 1972 to 1998. Amid pressure built after India's nuclear test in 1998, Pakistan successfully conducted its first publicly announced nuclear tests in 1998: Chagai-I and Chagai-II. With these tests, Pakistan became the seventh nation to achieve the status of a nuclear power.

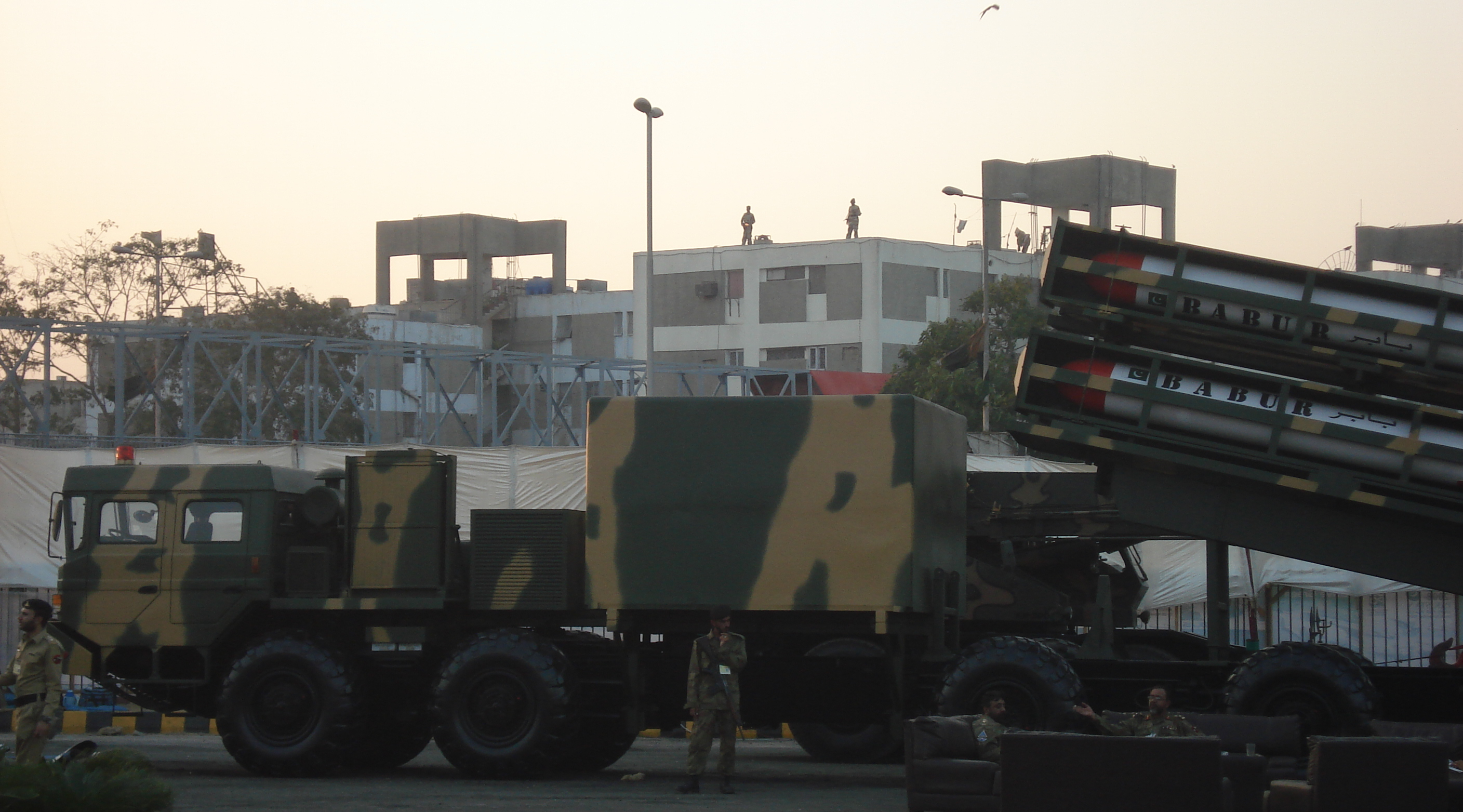
The Babur missile system deployed in IDEAS 2008 convention in 2008

Under a public policy guidance, strategic weapons and projects are researched and developed entirely by civilian scientists and engineers, who also develop a wide range of delivery systems. On military policy issues, Pakistan issues directives towards "first use" and maintains that its programme is based on nuclear deterrence, to peacefully discourage attack by India and other countries with large conventional-force advantages over Pakistan. According to United States military sources, Pakistan has achieved survivability in a possible nuclear conflict through second strike capability. Since the early 1990s, Pakistan's nuclear strategists have emphasised attaining "second strike" capability in spite of their "first use" policy. Statements and physical actions by Pakistan have cited the survivability through a second strike, forming a naval-based command and control system to serve as "the custodian of the nation's second-strike capability."

In January 2000, the head of United States Central Command, General Anthony Zinni, told NBC that longtime assumptions that India had an edge in the South Asian strategic balance of power were questionable at best. Said Zinni: "Don't assume that the Pakistanis' nuclear capability is inferior to the Indians".

Despite international pressure, Pakistan has refused to sign either the Nuclear Non-Proliferation Treaty or the Comprehensive Nuclear Test Ban Treaty. Initiatives taken towards consolidating strategic infrastructure led to the establishment, in 2000, of the National Command Authority (NCA), which oversees the policy, military control, development, and deployment of the country's tactical and strategic nuclear arsenals. The command and control of the strategic arsenal are kept under an inter-service strategic command which reports directly at the Joint staff HQ.

Since its establishment in 2000, the chairperson of the NCA has been the Prime Minister of Pakistan. The NCA supervises and forms a tight control of the strategic organisations related to the research and development in Weapons of Mass Destruction (WMD). Pakistan has an extremely strict command and control system over its strategic assets, which is based on C4ISTAR (Command, Control, Communications, and Computing of Intelligence, Surveillance, Target Acquisition and Reconnaissance). Pakistan's strategic command structure has a three-tier system which forms by combining the National Command Authority, Strategic Plans Division and each of three Inter-Services strategic force commands. The SPD's own force called SPD Force is responsible for security of nuclear weapons while the strategic forces commands of the air force, army, and navy exercise the deployments and eventual usage of the WMDs. However, the executive decisions, operational planning's, and controls over the WMDs remains vested with the NCA under the Prime Minister of Pakistan.

== Academies and affiliated institutions ==
The military academies are:

- Pakistan Military Academy
- Pakistan Air Force Academy
- Pakistan Naval Academy

Pakistan military affiliated instituitions:

- National Defence University
- Command and Staff College
- PAF Air War College
- Combat Commanders' School
- Pakistan Naval War College
- Military College of Engineering
- College of Electrical and Mechanical Engineering
- Army Medical College
- Military College of Signals
- College of Aeronautical Engineering
- College of Flying Training
- Pakistan Navy Engineering College
- Air University
- Fauji University
- Bahria University

== Military justice system ==
Pakistan's military justice system rests on the inter-services administrated Judge Advocate General Branch (JAG); all military criminal cases are overseen by the high-ranking officials of joint tribunals of the military. Each major service branch has its own service law: Army Justice Act, promulgated in 1952; the PAF Justice Act, established in 1953; and the Navy Ordinance, enacted in 1961. The identities of active-duty uniformed JAG officials are kept classified and no details of such individuals are made available to media.

All three sets of service laws are administered by the individual major service branches under the central reporting supervision of the Ministry of Defence (MoD). The army has a four-tier system while the air force and navy have three-tier systems. The two top levels of all three-tier systems are the general court-martial and district court-martial; the third level comprises the field general court-martial in the army, air force, and navy. The fourth-level tier of the army comprises the summary court-martial. The differences in tier levels reflect whether their competence extends to officers or enlisted personnel, and the severity of the punishment that may be imposed.

Pakistan's Supreme Court and the civilian courts cannot question decisions handed down by the military judges, and double jeopardy is prohibited. In cases where a member of the military is alleged to have committed a crime against a civilian, then the MoD and Ministry of Justice (MoJ) determine the prosecution of the case to be tried, whether military or civilian courts have jurisdiction. Former servicemen in civilian life who are accused of felonies committed while on active duty are liable for prosecution under the jurisdiction of military courts. These courts are empowered to dispense a wide range of punishments including death. All sentences of imprisonment are served in military prisons or detention barracks.

== Involvement in Pakistani civil society ==
According to the views of British scholar Anatol Lieven, the Pakistan Armed Forces play a vital role in keeping the Pakistani state together, promoting a spirit of unity and nationhood, and providing a bastion of selfless service to the nation. As an institution, the armed forces have been integrated into Pakistani civil society since the establishment of the country in 1947. The military has been involved in building much of the country's infrastructure (such as dams, bridges, canals, power stations, and energy projects) and civil–military input from all sections of the armed forces has helped to build a stable society and professionalism in the armed forces.

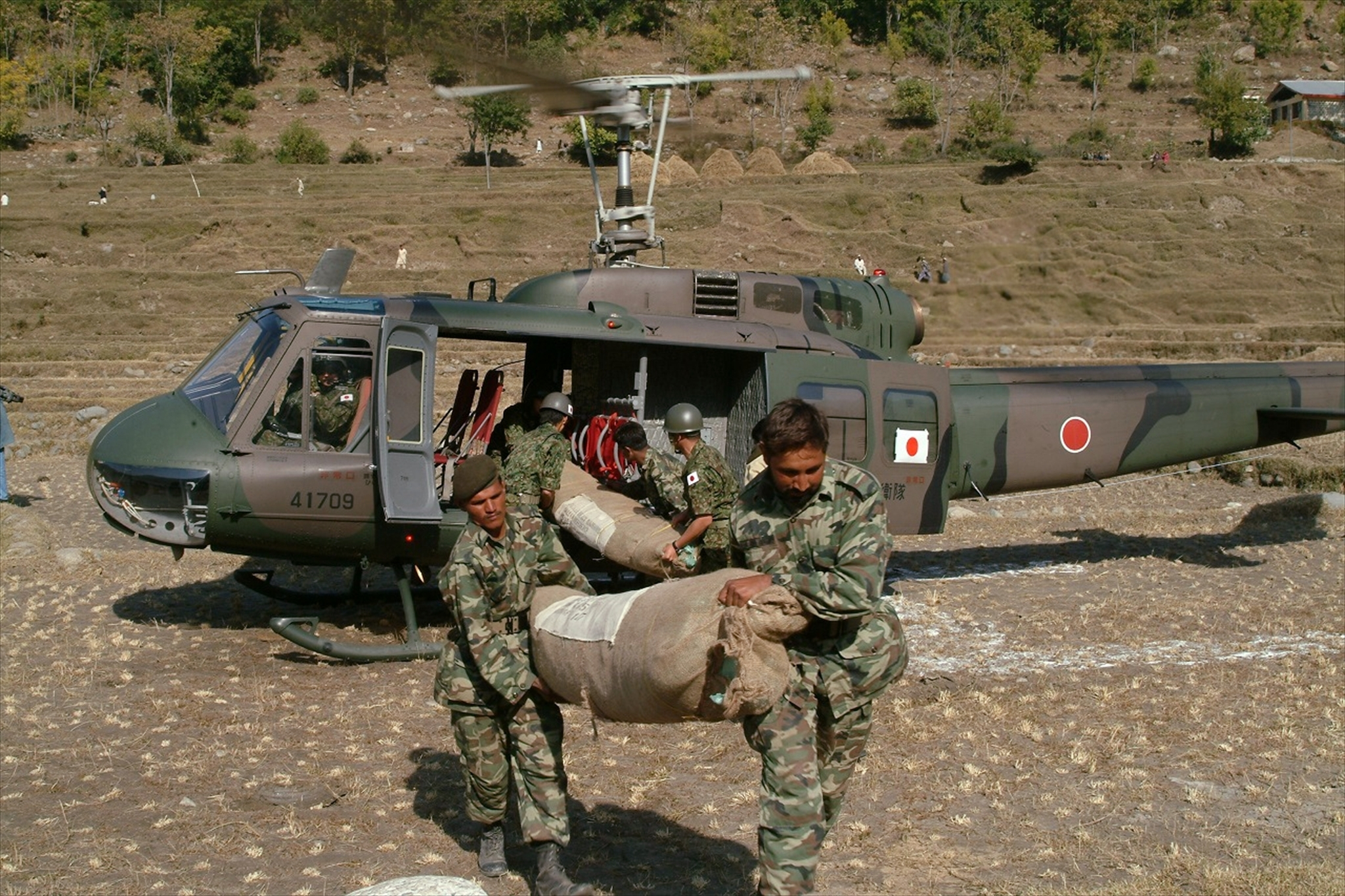
Pakistan military troops in relief efforts missions in 2005

In times of natural disasters such as floods and earthquakes, army engineers, medical and logistics personnel, and the armed forces generally have played a major role in rescue, relief, and supply efforts. In 2010, armed forces personnel donated one day of salary for their flood-effected brethren.

In 1996, Chairman Joint Chiefs of Staff, General Jehangir Karamat, described the Pakistan Armed Forces' relations with civilian society:

In my opinion, if we have to [have a] repeat of past events, then we must understand that military leaders can pressure only up to a point. Beyond that, their own position starts getting undermined, because the military is, after all, a mirror image of the civil society from which it is drawn.

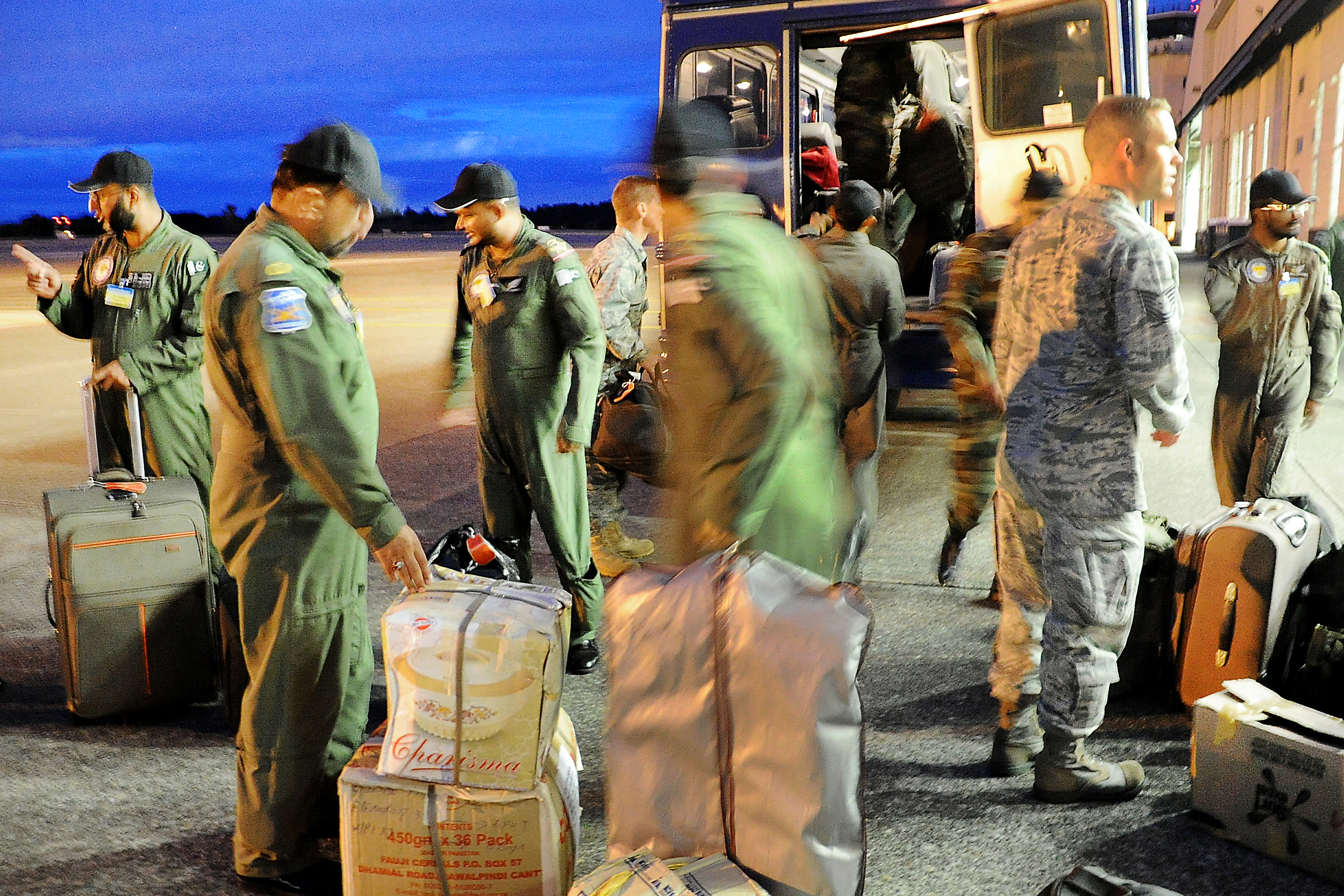
Pakistan Air Force airmen participating in relief operations

According to 2012 reports of the National Reconstruction Bureau (NRB), around 91.1% of civilian infrastructure in the Federally Administered Tribal Area was built by the armed forces in a policy based on sustainable development plans, to improve the livelihood of ordinary people of the region. According to Air Force statistics, the air force conducted approximately 693 relief operations in Pakistan and abroad during the fiscal period 1998–2008. The Air Force carried and distributed thousands of tons of wheat, medicines, emergency shelters, and provided assistance to rehabilitate the disaster-effected areas of the country.

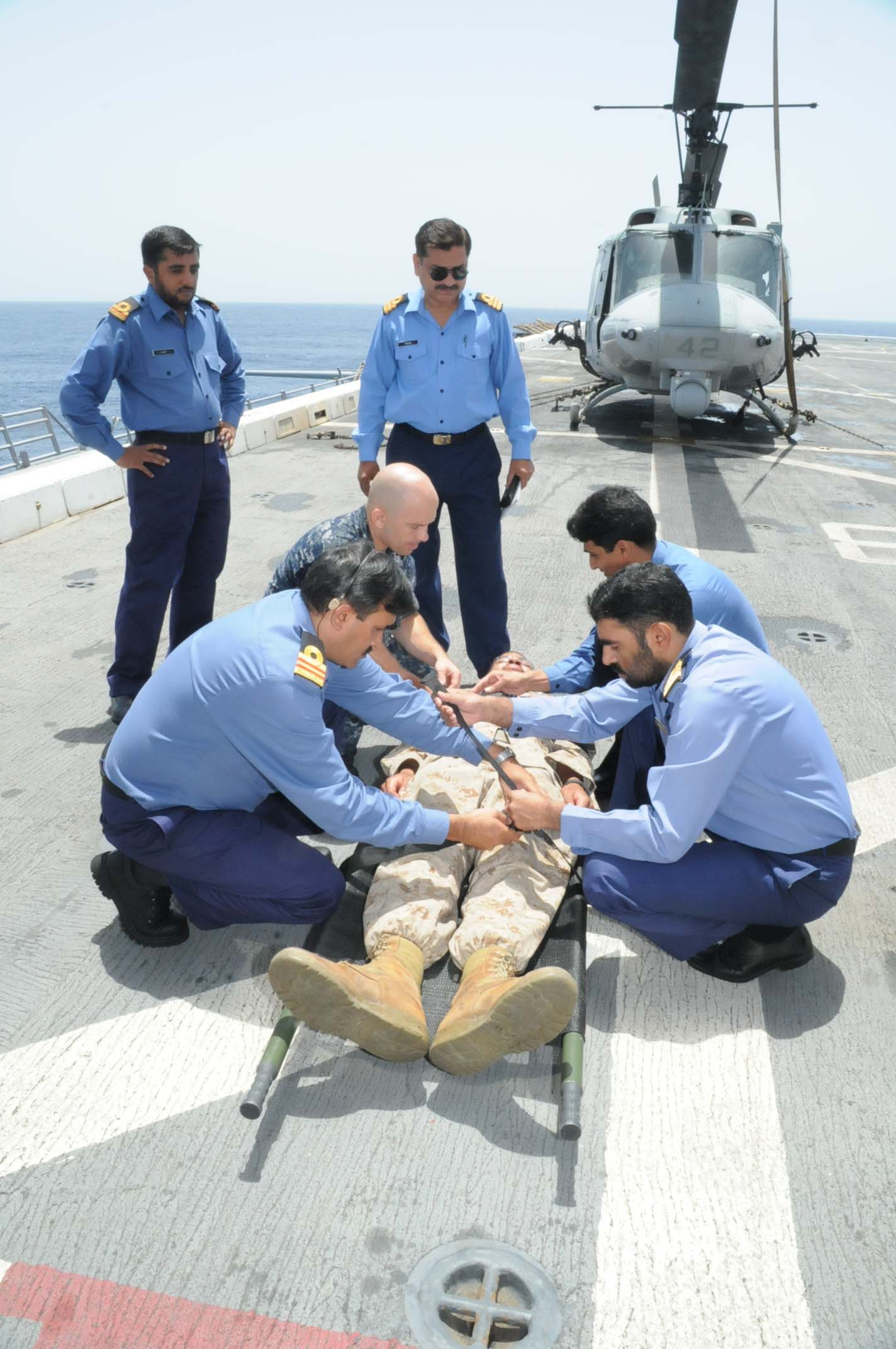
Pakistan Navy medical specialists conducting medical training while abroad on a sea mission

During the wave of floods from 2010 to 2014, the Navy launched relief operations nationwide and provided healthcare, medicines, relief efforts, and co-ordinated the distribution of food in the flood-effected areas. In the Navy's own admission, it had provided 43,850 kilograms (96,670 lb) of food and relief goods to flood victims; this included 5,700 kg of ready-to-cook food, 1,000 kg of dates and 5,000 kg of food dispatched to Sukkur. The Pakistan Naval Air Arm had air dropped more than 500 kg of food and relief goods in Thal, Ghospur, and Mirpur areas.

Engineering units of the Navy built more than 87 houses distributed to the local internally displaced persons (IDPs). About 69,000 affected IDPs were treated in Navy medical camps.

=== Criticism ===
In Pakistan, Pakistan Army, Pakistan Air Force, Pakistan Navy, and some intelligence agencies are considered as part of Pakistani military. Over the years, the military has been criticised for its past and present actions. Most of the criticism is levelled against Pakistan Army who is the most dominant branch of Pakistan's military. It has been criticised for eroding democratic processes in Pakistan, for being the largest business conglomeration in the country, for excessive control over the domestic and foreign policies of Pakistan, for war crimes, role in Bengali genocide, and corruption within the institution.

Criticism of military is generally considered as a no-go area and fierce critics are treated brutally by the military from enforced disappearances to extrajudicial killings. Some of the critics of Pakistan Army, such as human rights activist Manzoor Pashteen, have been jailed while others like Ahmad Noorani and Taha Siddiqui have been forced to flee the country.

==== Handling of corruption allegations ====
The Army runs the Fauji Foundation which sold Khoski Sugar Mill in 2004 for PKR 300 million despite receiving the highest bid of PKR 387 million. In 2005, a corruption case was filed in the National Accountability Bureau (NAB) against then managing director Syed Muhammad Amjad who was involved in the corruption.

In 2010, a corruption scandal was unearthed that involved two Pakistan Army generals, (Maj Gen Khalid Zaheer Akhtar and Lt Gen Muhammad Afzal), and caused a loss of Rs. 1.8 billion to the National Logistics Corporation through speculative investments between 2004 and 2008. In 2015, both of them were convicted by the military court of Pakistan.

===== Air Force corruption =====
The Pakistan Air Force runs the Shaheen Foundation which founded Shaheen Insurance in 1995 as a joint venture with a South African insurance company, Hollard Group. Later, Hollard's management was dissatisfied with the investment, citing corruption as a major impediment to their investment's success.

===== Navy handling of corruption allegations =====
Pakistan Navy's officials were found guility of corruption in Karachi affair. Commissions of 6.25% of the contract, approximately €50 million, were paid out to the lobbying firms in Pakistan and France. Some €50m were allegedly paid as "sweeteners" to various senior Pakistan Navy admirals and officers as well as the political leaders. In 1996–97, the Naval Intelligence led by its Director-General, Rear-Admiral Tanvir Ahmed, secretly launched its investigations into this matter and began collecting physical evidence that eventually led to the exposure of Chief of Naval Staff, Admiral Mansurul Haq, in receiving massive monetary commissions in 1997. Massive media coverage and the news of the dismissals of one and two-star admirals tarnished the image of the Navy, with Admiral Fasih Bokhari, who took over the command of the Navy from Admiral Mansurul Haq, forced to attempt damage control of the situation.

== Commemoration and parades ==
The Youm-e-Difa (English: Defence Day) – Pakistan's day in remembrance of fallen soldiers of the Indo-Pakistani war of 1965 – is observed on 6 September. Memorial services are held in the presence of Pakistan's top military and civil officials. Wreaths of flowers are laid on the graves of the fallen soldiers and ceremonies are held across the country. The change of guard ceremony takes place at Mazar-e-Quaid, where the cadets of inter-services academies present Guard of Honour and take the charge. Additionally, the Youm-e-Fizaya (Air Force Day) is celebrated on 7 September, and the Youm-e-Bahriya (Navy Day) on 8 September.

The Pakistan Armed Forces parades take place on 23 March, which is celebrated as Youm-e-Pakistan (Pakistan Day). All main service branches parade on Constitution Avenue in Islamabad, where the weapon exhibitions are televised.

== Awards and honours ==
=== Wartime Gallantry Awards ===
Nishan-e-Haider (Order of the Lion)
Hilal-e-Jurat (Crescent of Courage)
Sitara-e-Jurat (Star of Courage)
Tamgha-e-Jurat (Medal of Courage)
Imtiazi Sanad (Mentioned in Despatches)

Order of wear
Nishan-e-Haider (Order of the Lion)	Nishan-e-Imtiaz (Civilian)	Nishan-e-Imtiaz (Military)	Hilal-e-Jurat (Crescent of Courage)
Hilal-e-Shujaat (Crescent of Bravery)	Hilal-e-Imtiaz (Civilian)	Hilal-e-Imtiaz (Military)	Sitara-e-Jurat (Star of Courage)
Sitara-e-Shujaat (Star of Bravery)	Sitara-e-Imtiaz (Military)	President's Award for Pride of Performance	Sitara-e-Basalat (Star of Good Conduct)
Sitara-e-Eisaar (Star of Sacrifice)	Tamgha-e-Jurat (Medal of Courage)	Tamgha-e-Shujaat (Medal of Bravery)	Tamgha-e-Imtiaz (Military)
Tamgha-e-Basalat (Medal of Good Conduct)	Tamgha-e-Eisaar (Medal of Sacrifice)	Imtiazi Sanad (Mentioned in Despatches)	Tamgha-e-Diffa (General Service Medal)
Sitara-e-Harb 1965 War (War Star 1965)	Sitara-e-Harb 1971 War (War Star 1971)	Tamgha-e-Jang 1965 War (War Medal 1965)	Tamgha-e-Jang 1971 War (War Medal 1971)
Tamgha-e-Baqa (Nuclear Test Medal)	Tamgha-e-Istaqlal Pakistan (Escalation with India Medal)	Tamgha-e-Azm (Medal of Conviction)	Tamgha-e-Khidmat (Class-I) (Medal of Service Class I)
Tamgha-e-Khidmat (Class-II) (Medal of Service Class I)	Tamgha-e-Khidmat (Class-III) (Medal of Service Class I)	10 Years Service Medal	20 Years Service Medal
30 Years Service Medal	35 Years Service Medal	40 Years Service Medal	Pakistan Tamgha (Pakistan Medal)
Tamgha-e-Sad Saala Jashan-e- Wiladat-e-Quaid-e-Azam	Tamgha-e-Jamhuria (Republic Commemoration Medal)	Hijri Tamgha (Hijri Medal)	Jamhuriat Tamgha (Democracy Medal)
Qarardad-e-Pakistan Tamgha (Resolution Day Golden Jubilee Medal)	Tamgha-e-Salgirah Pakistan (Independence Day Golden Jubilee Medal)	Command & Staff College Quetta Instructor's Medal	Command & Staff College Quetta Student Medal

== See also ==
- List of missiles of Pakistan
- Defence industry of Pakistan
- Military exercises of Pakistan
- Pakistan Armed Forces Band
- Pakistan Armed Forces deployments
- Protocol Agreement-2026 (Pakistan–Kuwait)
- Women in the Pakistan Armed Forces
- Space & Upper Atmosphere Research Commission
