= Corruption in Pakistan =

Corruption in Pakistan involves fraudulent practices carried out by officials and institutions, ranging from petty bribery to high-profile scandals.

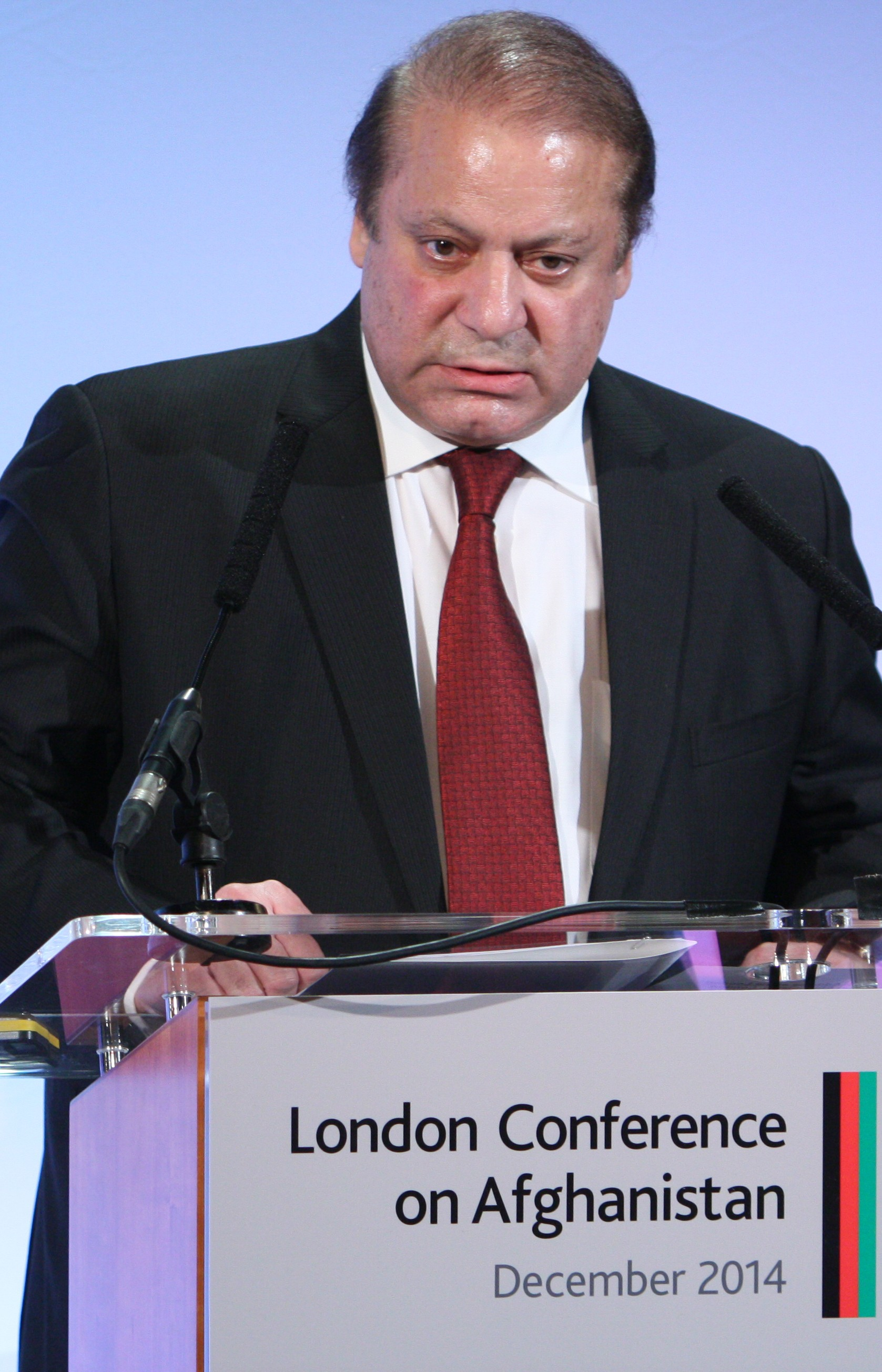
Prime Minister Nawaz Sharif was ousted and faced corruption charges after the Panama Papers leak.

Corruption distorts economic decision-making, deters investment, undermines competitiveness and, ultimately, hinders economic growth in the country. The problems are deeply entrenched, spanning back decades, and despite ongoing calls for reform, and many attempts to improve the situation, there is little evidence of progress.

== Brief history ==
"Corruption is a curse in India and amongst Muslims, especially the so-called educated and intelligentsia. Unfortunately, it is this class that is selfish and morally and intellectually corrupt. No doubt this disease is common, but amongst this particular class of Muslims it is rampant."

— Pakistan founder Jinnah's letter to Ispahani,
6 May 1945

The Dominion of Pakistan was created as a result of the Pakistan Movement in 1947. Upon gaining independence, Pakistan inherited a strong bureaucracy and army from the British Raj. There has since been no major change in this bureaucratic set-up since it was first implemented by the British, although reforms were proposed by the Musharraf regime in 2007. This has led many to speculate that "corruption has seeped into the higher echelons of bureaucracy" where "corruption cases are [mostly] reported against irregular and ex-cadre appointments". It was by the late 1960s that the bureaucracy started being portrayed as an "instrument of oppression". In multiple reports published by the World Bank, the Pakistani bureaucracy was seen as being rife with corruption, inefficient and bloated in size with an absence of accountability and resistance to change.

=== Bureaucracy and secession of East Pakistan: 1954–1971 ===
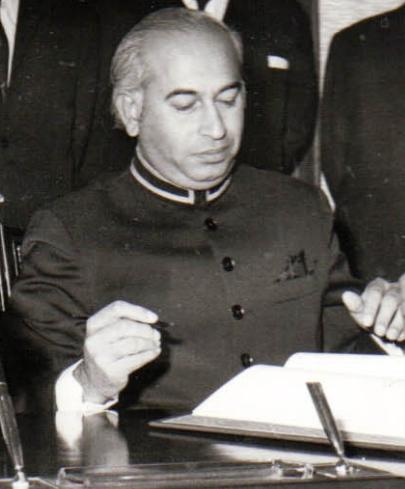
Bhutto introduced the nationalisation programme in order to revitalise the economy but these policies were used by certain individuals and groups to accumulate wealth.

The bureaucratic influence was strong in the western provinces of Pakistan while the eastern province retained a majority of the population. On 22 November 1954, bureaucratic administrators moved a resolution to merge the four western provinces into a single unit called West Pakistan. This led to public outcry in East Pakistan who felt that they were being misrepresented and systematically marginalised by the land-owning Punjabi Muslim elites who enjoyed higher bureaucratic positions at the time. This led to the secession of East Pakistan into the separate nation-state of Bangladesh and lay witness to the corrupt malpractices of the Punjabi elite in West Pakistan. Punjabis argued that East Pakistan's majority was a consequence of the high percentage of Bengali Hindus in the province who were not involved in the state's decision-making processes. Thus, the Punjabi landowners remained largely unrepentant of their desires to "[secure] their own hegemony" leading to the loss of the eastern province in 1971.

=== Nationalisation politicises economic planning: 1973–1977 ===
After Zulfikar Ali Bhutto came into power in 1973, he introduced a planned economic system to revitalise the stagnant economy. This led to the introduction of the nationalisation programme bringing entire private industrial corporations under government ownership. In 1974, Bhutto cancelled the fourth five-year plans bypassing the recommendations of the Planning Commission, focusing entirely on broadening government control over private business enterprises. In doing so, Bhutto's government began the politicisation of economic planning.

Political interference opened doors for corrupt political practices to seep into the nation's economic planning processes. The nationalisation programme badly affected the reputation of the Pakistan Peoples Party. Accumulated losses of up to Rs 254 million were reported with several instances of over-staffing and inefficient productivity in heavy mechanical industries. By 1976, the state had been hijacked by groups and individuals trying to accumulate wealth by redistributing resources from public enterprises to private individuals. Public enterprises "became a device to extend political patronage to those that the regime favoured, to pay political debts, or to accumulate power".

=== Denationalisation and political favouritism: 1978–1988 ===
Bhutto's nationalisation programme lost its appeal towards the end of his government's term and the demand for denationalisation gained more currency. The successive government of military chief and president Muhammad Zia-ul-Haq released a whitepaper that led to the creation of a commission under Pakistan Industrial Credit and Investment Corporation (PICIC) to reverse earlier nationalisation efforts. Not much was achieved in this regard and only three industries, including future Prime Minister Nawaz Sharif's conglomerate Ittefaq Group of Industries, were ever denationalised and returned to their owners. Many argued that Sharif was favoured in this process because he was a political protégé of the military dictator at the helm.

=== Unprecedented political corruption: 2008–2013 ===
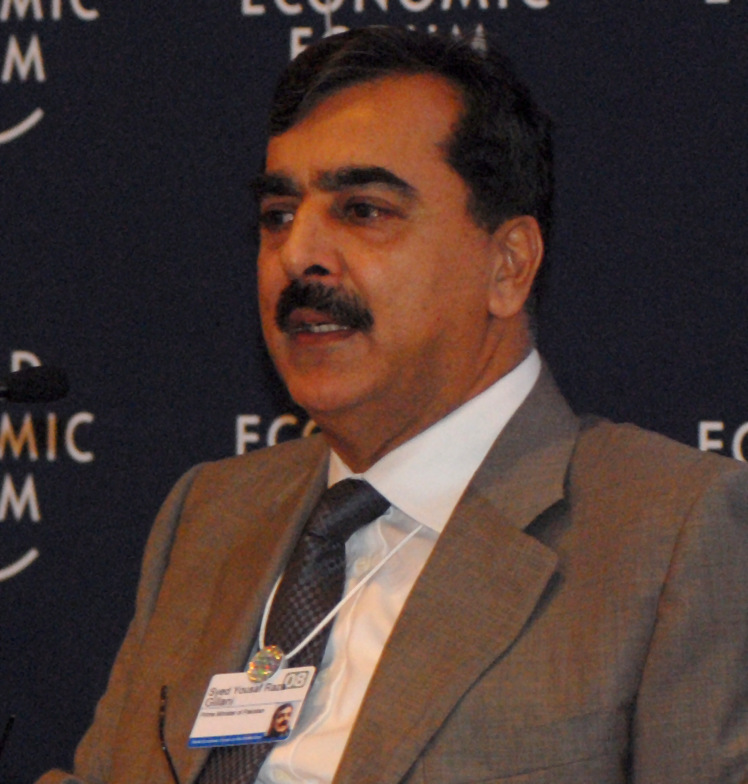
Yousaf Raza Gillani became the first head of state to be convicted while holding office and later disqualified on charges of loan defaulting.

In 2012, Transparency International (TI) calculated that Pakistan had lost more than Rs 8.5 trillion (US$ 94 billion) in corruption, tax evasion and bad governance in the PPP-led coalition government from 2008 to 2013.

=== Present ===
From 2013 to 2017, while Nawaz Sharif was in power, Transparency International indicated a significant drop in corruption as Pakistan improved from a score of 28 to 32 in the TI Corruption Perceptions Index, even though serious allegations of corruption were levelled against him during that time. During those years, the Index scored 180 countries across the world on a scale of 0 ("highly corrupt") to 100 ("very clean") according to how honest their public sectors are perceived to be; a high score indicates a perception of an honest public sector.

Adil Gillani, an advisor for TI Pakistan, observed in 2012 that if Pakistan checked the menace of corruption and ensured good governance, it would not require a single penny from the outside world. The 2008–2013 PPP-led coalition government was criticised as being the most corrupt in the country's history. The free and powerful local media in Pakistan exposed various cases of corruption during the government's tenure including cases of bribery and corruption in government-owned enterprises like Pakistan International Airlines and Pakistan Railways.

On 29 March 2012, a civilian resident of Johar Town Lahore, Tariq Ahmed, filed a court petition in the Lahore High Court, seeking to hear the case of disqualification of Prime Minister Yousaf Raza Gillani. The plea was filed in the High Court in which the petitioner took the stance that "Fauzia Gillani— spouse of Prime Minister Gillani received loans of millions of rupees from the Agriculture Development Bank Ltd (ADB) and the National Bank of Pakistan for the two mega-corporations owned by the Gillani family of which Fauzia Gillani served both megacorporations as executive director. None of the loans of millions of rupees were paid back to the banks. When the disqualification petition was put to rest by the ruling of the Speaker of the National Assembly Dr Fehmida Mirza citing that the petition did not hold ground, Gillani was convicted on the charges of Contempt of Court. Gillani became Pakistan's first Prime Minister to be convicted while holding office and was later sentenced and disqualified. Gillani is prudently criticised for a prolonged era of stagflation, in which fundamental economic problems were ignored, the government was mismanaged and corruption was endemic.

In the 2025 Corruption Perceptions Index, Pakistan received a score of 28, positioning the country at 136 out of 182 nations globally. By comparison, the best-scoring country in the region (Note: The Asia Pacific countries: Afghanistan, Australia, Bangladesh, Bhutan, Brunei Darussalam, Cambodia, China, Fiji, Hong Kong, India, Indonesia, Japan, North Korea, South Korea, Laos, Malaysia, Maldives, Mongolia, Myanmar, Nepal, New Zealand, Pakistan, Papua New Guinea, Philippines, Singapore, Solomon Islands, Sri Lanka, Taiwan, Thailand, Timor-Leste, Vanuatu, Vietnam) received a score of 84, the average score was 45 and the worst-scoring country received 15. Worldwide, the best score of the 182 countries evaluated that year was 89, the average score was 42, and the worst score was 9.

== Anti-corruption efforts ==
=== Prevention of Corruption Acts: 1947, 1950 and 1958 ===
The Prevention of Corruption Act, 1947 implemented in the Dominion of Pakistan was enacted to make effective provisions for the prevention of bribery and corruption of public servants, particularly in the bureaucratic administration. The autonomous Princely State of Bahawalpur adopted its own version of the act, namely the Bahawalpur Prevention of Corruption Act, of 1950.

In 1955, an accord was signed between Nawab Sadeq Mohammad Khan V and Lt Gen Ghulam Muhammad Malik which made the state of Bahawalpur a part of the province of West Pakistan. This geopolitical change meant that the original act needed amendments to include Bahawalpur and other regions which were originally left out of the act. Subsequently, in October 1958, an ordinance was passed to extend the act to the whole of the province of West Pakistan – this is known as the Prevention of Corruption Act (West Pakistan Extension) Ordinance, 1958. This ordinance extended the scope of the original to the districts of Karat, Kharan, Makran and Lasbela and also repealed the Bahawalpur Prevention of Corruption Act, of 1950.

=== National Accountability Bureau Ordinance, 1999 ===
On 16 November 1999, Ordinance XIX was passed which later came to be known as the National Accountability Bureau Ordinance. It called for the establishment of the National Accountability Bureau (NAB) as an autonomous federal institution-building efforts to combat cases of corruption, financial crimes and economic terrorism in Pakistan. According to the ordinance, NAB was granted authority to launch investigations, conduct inquiries, and issue arrest warrants against individuals suspected of financial mismanagement, terrorism, corruption in private, state, defence and corporate sectors), and direct such cases to accountability courts. Individuals convicted under the National Accountability Bureau Ordinance are prohibited from holding political office for ten years.

=== Provincial legislation against corruption ===
The provincial governments of Pakistan are responsible for legislation in their respective provinces and since 2013, there have been several legislative efforts against corruption, primarily in the provinces of Khyber Pakhtunkhwa and Punjab. Following is a list of recent anti-corruption legislation:

==== Khyber Pakhtunkhwa anti-corruption legislation ====
The Khyber Pakhtunkhwa Right to Information Bill was passed in the provincial assembly on 31 October 2013. It was enacted throughout the province by the Governor of Khyber Pakhtunkhwa on 4 November 2013 as the Khyber Pakhtunkhwa Right to Information Act, 2013. The legislation makes way for provisions that add transparency to the various functions and departments of the government. It gives the citizens of the province the right to access any information or record held by a public body, except for the information that is sensitive to the security of the state.

== Role of mainstream and social media ==
=== Mainstream media ===
Before 2002, the electronic media was entirely dominated by state-owned institutions like Pakistan Television Corporation and Pakistan Broadcasting Corporation. This monopoly was thwarted, when the Musharraf regime regulated the electronic media allowing for private television channels to be operated independently. Since the liberalisation of electronic media in 2002, it has served as a major force in exposing corruption-related cases and scams.

Following are a few of the major corruption scams and scandals reported and exposed in the mainstream Pakistani media:

- Rental Power Projects (RPP) scam: In 2006, the media reported on a case involving several instances of bribery in the Rental Power Projects (RPP) where top-level ministers were involved. Former Prime Minister Raja Pervez Ashraf was also allegedly involved in these cases of corruption but was later cleared by the NAB. His involvement in this case earned him the nickname "Raja Rental".
- PMDC fake registrations: In 2010, Dr Ahmad Nadeem Akbar, Registrar of the Pakistan Medical and Dental Council cancelled fake registrations done by some PM&DC officials and dismissed them from service as they were found to issuing fake registration of medical professionals, allowing for inexperienced personnel to take up important positions in medicine and play with lives of public. The Islamabad High Court in July 2014 and earlier the Supreme Court had upheld his actions and ordered high power inquiries by NAB in this regard against culprits nominated by Dr Ahmad Nadeem Akbar Once this negligence was reported in the media, the Anti-corruption and Crime Wing of the Federal Investigation Agency took action and identified fake registrations for 40 doctors and 19 medical colleges. The case of registration of 19 medical colleges in one day was investigated by Honourable Justice Shabbar Raza Rizvi and the report points towards corruption by the PM&DC Executive Committee member Dr Asim Hussain and Prof Massod Hameed Khan and the employees of the Federal Ministry. As of 2013, FIA had identified about 150 probable instances of fake registrations.
- Mismanagement of state-owned institutions: Pakistan's flagship airline Pakistan International Airlines (PIA) was reported to have been mismanagement by the executive authorities giving rise to a corrupt culture of bribery. Corruption in PIA led to losses of around US$ 500 million. Similarly, massive financial losses were reported for Pakistan Railways caused by embezzlement.
- Hajj corruption case: Media reported on an ongoing corruption scandal involving federal ministers extorting illegal payouts from travel agents involved in fleecing Hajj pilgrims to Saudi Arabia. The Minister of Science and Technology, Azam Khan Swati, identified and named the Minister of Religious Affairs, Hamid Saeed Kazmi, as being responsible for giving out these illegal orders. He revealed that he had already warned the Prime Minister about the scandal thereby making several leading members of the parliament accessory to these criminal offences.
- OGRA scam: One Adnan Khwaja brother-in-law of PPP Secretary-General Punjab was appointed as Chairman who was instrumental in the scam. The OGRA scam case is sub-judice and the ex-chairman is being prosecuted but at snail's pace.
- NATO containers case: Media reported on 40 NATO containers that went missing on their way to the International Security Assistance Force (ISAF) in Afghanistan. It was later identified that the missing containers carried cargo that was considered contraband in Pakistan, including liquor to be sold in Pakistan.
- Pakistan Steel Mills scam: The mainstream media reported a major scam in the Pakistan Steel Mills involving Rs 26.5 billion. Once the scam was reported, the FIA initially took action but their progress turned sluggish due to which the Supreme Court issued a contempt of court notice to the Interior Minister Rehman Malik for hindering and interfering with the investigation.
- NICL corruption case: The National Insurance Company Limited scandal was first reported in the media in 2012 involving the purchase of 10 acres of land in Karachi by the company at "an exorbitant price" and the transfer of millions of rupees from the account of Zafar Salim, a cousin of the land seller Khwaja Akbar Butt into the joint accounts of Makhdoom Muhammad Ameen Faheem, his wife and his son.
- Ephedrine quota case: The Ephedrine quote case was a scandal involving Prime Minister Yousaf Raza Gillani's son, Ali Musa Gillani, who pressured officials of the Ministry of Health into allocating a quota (worth Rs 70 billion) of controlled chemical ephedrine to two different Multan-based pharmaceutical companies.
- The mediagate scandal: It was reported that Chief Justice of Pakistan Iftikhar Muhammad Chaudhry's son had allegedly taken money from Malik Riaz Hussain, a real-estate tycoon, to persuade courts to give decisions in favour of the latter. Renowned columnist and anchorperson Javed Chaudhry observed that the case against Malik Riaz proved that the media can hold itself and the judiciary accountable. He further added that this case along with the case for missing persons effectively establishes the credibility and impartiality of the media's fight against corruption.
- 2024 National Highway Authority (NHA) Scandal: In January 2024, Pakistan's National Accountability Bureau (NAB) launched an investigation into alleged embezzlement of ₨25 billion (≈$90 million) in the National Highway Authority (NHA). The funds, allocated for the Sukkur-Hyderabad Motorway (M-6), were reportedly diverted through fake contracts and inflated billing. Key accused include:
  - Former NHA Chairman Capt. (retd.) Muhammad Khurram Agha (arrested March 2024)
  - 5 contractors linked to shell companies (Dawn, 2024) The scandal triggered protests by the Pakistan Engineers Forum, demanding reforms in public infrastructure tendering (The News International, 2024).

=== Social media ===
In the wake of the 2013 elections, massive electoral rigging was alleged through first-hand accounts of several members of the public via social networking websites. Specialised websites were set up to publish and archive material exposing corrupt malpractices throughout the many polling stations serving several constituencies. Several leaked videos of persons supposed to be caught in the act of rigging the polls went viral and caught the eye of the mainstream media becoming topics of discussion in days to follow. However, a judicial probe found these allegations to be unsubstantiated. Even before the elections, social media served as an effective tool to hold the nation's to-be-leaders "accountable" for various issues like corruption and education.

Citizen journalism is emerging as a growing phenomenon and social media is being touted in Pakistan as an important tool that can be used to strengthen democracy. Adding to the mix, several prominent politicians have moved to the likes of Twitter to gather support and get prospective voters on board and analysts think that this can lead to a better and direct accountability of political leaders. Social media has also proved effective in identifying corruption in mainstream media, particularly in the case of the mediagate scandal.

== Corruption by sector ==
=== Bureaucratic corruption ===
Bribery: common in obtaining basic services like issuing passports, CNICs, land registrations, driving licenses, etc.

Nepotism and patronage: jobs, promotions, and contracts often go to those with political connections rather than merit.

Misuse of authority: officials may exploit their positions for personal gain, favoring certain individuals or businesses.

Embezzlement and kickbacks: misappropriation of public funds, especially in the public works, health, and education sectors.

=== Pakistan Armed Forces ===
The Army runs the Fauji Foundation which sold Khoski Sugar Mill in 2004 for PKR 300 million despite receiving the highest bid of PKR 387 million. In 2005, a corruption case was filed in the National Accountability Bureau (NAB) against then managing director Syed Muhammad Amjad who was involved in the corruption.

In 2010, a corruption scandal was unearthed that involved two Pakistan Army generals, (Maj Gen Khalid Zaheer Akhtar and Lt Gen Muhammad Afzal), and caused a loss of Rs. 1.8 billion to the National Logistics Corporation through speculative investments between 2004 and 2008. In 2015, both of them were convicted by the military court of Pakistan.

==== Air Force corruption ====
The Pakistan Air Force runs the Shaheen Foundation which founded Shaheen Insurance in 1995 as a joint venture with a South African insurance company, Hollard Group. Later, Hollard's management was dissatisfied with the investment, citing corruption as a major impediment to their investment's success.

==== Navy handling of corruption allegations ====
Pakistan Navy's officials were found guility of corruption in Karachi affair. Commissions of 6.25% of the contract, approximately €50 million, were paid out to the lobbying firms in Pakistan and France. Some €50m were allegedly paid as "sweeteners" to various senior Pakistan Navy admirals and officers as well as the political leaders. In 1996–97, the Naval Intelligence led by its Director-General, Rear-Admiral Tanvir Ahmed, secretly launched its investigations into this matter and began collecting physical evidence that eventually led to the exposure of Chief of Naval Staff, Admiral Mansurul Haq, in receiving massive monetary commissions in 1997. Massive media coverage and the news of the dismissals of one and two-star admirals tarnished the image of the Navy, with Admiral Fasih Bokhari, who took over the command of the Navy from Admiral Mansurul Haq, forced to attempt damage control of the situation.

=== Judiciary ===
In 2002, in a report titled "Nature and Extent of Corruption in the Public Sector", Transparency International (TI) Pakistan reported that the highest amounts of bribery were spent on people affiliated with the judiciary. Later in 2010, TI Pakistan presented a breakdown of the various actors in the judicial system involved in corruption. A majority of the participants reported that they, or someone in their household, have been subjected to an act of corruption while interacting with someone from the judiciary. When asked of the actors involved, 33.62% people said court employees, 23.73% said public prosecutors, 14.12% said witnesses, 12.43% said judges, 8.19% said opponent lawyer, 4.52% said magistrates and 3.39% mentioned others.

In a 2011 survey, TI Pakistan identified the judiciary as the most corrupt institution in Pakistan alongside the police. Nevertheless, with the proceedings of some high-impact corruption cases against government officials, including the Prime Minister, the Supreme Court demonstrated its positive role in tackling corruption. Where the apex court was being hailed for its anti-corruption efforts in 2013, Mehmoodul Hassan, a member of the Sindh Bar Council, alleged that nepotism and corruption were still "rampant" in the lower judiciary, particularly high courts and the lower courts, where people were unlawfully promoted within the judiciary.

In 2023, the number of unresolved cases before the Supreme Court increased by 7 percent.

A 2025 IMF report identifies the judiciary as one of the critical bottlenecks behind corruption. As of 2025, Pakistan’s legal system was overwhelmed by more than two million pending cases.

=== Legislative ===
There have been high-profile corruption cases against high-ranking elected officials in Pakistan. In April 2018 former Prime Minister Nawaz Sharif was given a lifetime ban on political activities. Sharif was sentenced to 10 years in prison in July of 2018 for his involvement in real estate dealings in Panama. In November of 2023 a Pakistani court overturned Sharif's conviction, and he considered rejoining the political realm. In January 2025 former Prime Minister Imran Khan was sentenced to 14 years in prison and fined for leaking state secrets.

=== Education ===
In the 2010, TI Pakistan reported that about 23.7% of those surveyed received admission in educational institutions through non-normal and alternate procedures. One of the biggest problems identified in the country is the presence of a non-uniform educational system. The private sector actively encourages western educational models such as the General Certificate of Secondary Education using this to justify unaffordable fees they charge ordinary citizens. Finding gain in such enterprises, the elite class amongst politicians, technocrats, bureaucrats and businessmen usually capitalise in this venture. These attitudes can also explain the deteriorating standards in the public sector educational institutes. On the other hand, state-owned public schools face several challenges including poor management and governance, and incompetence of consecutive governments in the education sector. Further factors for failing standards in state-run institutions include lack of funding, non-utilisation by elite classes, appointments of under-qualified faculty.

For a brief time during the regime of Pervez Musharraf, Pakistan received unprecedented investments in its higher-education sector – this funding faltered with the arrival of Zardari's government after 2008. In 2011, Dr Syed Abdul Aziz, director of Hamdard Institute of Education and Social Sciences declared education as one of the most corrupt sectors in Pakistan. According to 2013 findings by Transparency International, factor that contribute to this corrupt culture in the sector include embezzlement of development funds allocated by the government, thousands of ghost schools that appear only on paper, bribes taken to sell confidential material to candidates, poor or under-utilisation of funds and an inertia to change on the behalf of the education ministry.

=== Health care ===
In 2010, 42% of surveyed individuals reported gaining access to hospital services by a method other than standard admission, and 48% reported either having to pay additional costs for essential services or being forced to utilize the services of a designated affiliate. Of the respondents who were asked to identify which parties orchestrated the corrupt acts, 61% reported hospital staff, 25% reported doctors, and 13% reported nurses.

=== Police and law enforcement ===
Corruption is found to be commonplace in the lower levels of police. Police was observed as the most corrupt sector in a 2013 survey by Transparency International (TI). This situation has persisted since the graft watchdog's July 2010 survey, in which it was noted that the major cause for corruption in this sector was due to a lack of accountability and merit, and low salaries. Payment of bribes in order to escape and avoid charges was also commonplace; 31% of 4,224 respondents reported paying bribes to the police. Citizen journalists upload instances of police officials taking bribes on social networking and video sharing websites like YouTube.

Ordinary citizens face challenges in reporting instances of corruption they encounter with the police. In 2005, Prime Minister Shaukat Aziz ordered an investigation into claims by a 23-year-old woman who alleged that, in retaliation for attempting to reveal police corruption, police falsely detained her for fifteen days and raped her.

=== Public utilities ===
As of 2002, 96% of surveyed individuals reported corruption issues with electrical utility officials during the past year. The most common types of corruption were billing related. Some consumers admitted to illegally reducing their utility bills, while others reported being harassed with inflated bills intended to solicit bribes. Out of the pool of corruption-affirmative respondents, 71% reported that money was "demanded directly by the actor".

=== Sports corruption ===
In August 2010, reporters from News of the World orchestrated a sting operation which was able to identify three Pakistani cricket players – Salman Butt, Mohammad Asif and Mohammad Amir – and a bookmaker Mazhar Majeed of being complicit in a row over spot-fixing in the fourth England-Pakistan test match at Lord's. The cricketers each received 30 months, one year and six months jail term respectively while the bookmaker received two years and eight months jail term in a verdict issued by the Southwark Crown Court on November 3, 2011. Following these events, on 15 November 2011, the chairman of the Pakistan Cricket Board, Zaka Ashraf established an anti-corruption unit to prevent players from becoming involved in illegal betting practices. The cricket board has introduced new anti-corruption laws in order to bring accountability among cricketers and board officials.

=== Taxation ===
According to the 2002 study, 99% of 256 respondents reported facing corruption of taxation. Furthermore, 32% of respondents reported paying bribes to have their tax assessment lowered, and nearly 14% reported receiving fictitious tax assessments until a bribe was paid.

=== Electoral ===
• 1960 Pakistani Referendum

On February 14, 1960, Pakistan held a referendum, which was President Muhammad Ayub Khan's first popular vote following the suspension of the parliamentary system in 1958. The lack of enthusiasm regarding the outcome was highlighted by the pre-emptive publication of Ayub Khan's inaugural plans by Dawn, several days before the official vote count was confirmed.

• 1977 Pakistani general election

The 1977 elections are widely regarded as rigged. Zulfikar Ali Bhutto, maintaining some aspects of the prior military regime, called for elections for the national and provincial assemblies on 7 and 10 March 1977, respectively. These elections were marred by allegations of manipulation, including the dissolution and replacement of the governments in Balochistan and North-West Frontier Province with PPP-led administrations.

• 1985 Pakistani general election

The 1985 elections, initially slated for 1977, were postponed following Zia-ul-Haq's coup, pledging elections within 90 days. These elections, notably partyless, barred political parties from fielding candidates due to a constitutional amendment.

Observers such as Nusrat Javed have noted the contrast between the nonpartisan nature of the 1985 elections and the specific political obstacles encountered in the 2024 elections. Tahir Mehdi attributed the current trend where independent candidates align with political parties' post-election to the precedents set in 1985, suggesting this practice undermined parliamentary democracy and electoral integrity. Mazhar Abbas argued that the lack of party-based elections amounted to inherent pre-poll rigging, deepening societal divisions along feudal and caste lines.

• 1990 Pakistani general election

The manipulation of the 1990 election can be traced back to the pre-1988 electoral landscape, with the formation of the Islami Jamhoori Ittehad(IJI), a coalition of nine parties. This alliance, orchestrated by former ISI Chief Hamid Gul, aimed to counter Prime Minister Benazir Bhutto's political influence. Despite being rapidly assembled, the IJI failed to secure a victory in the 1988 elections.

By 1990, the IJI had strengthened its position, with its chairman, Ghulam Mustafa Jatoi, serving as the caretaker prime minister of Pakistan for the elections, aiming to influence the outcome.

In 2012, the Supreme Court of Pakistan recognised substantial evidence of rigging in the 1990 elections, implicating Ghulam Ishaq Khan, Mirza Aslam Beg, and Asad Durrani. The court also highlighted the illegal distribution of Rs 140 million from the state treasury to opposition politicians by Younas Habib, aimed at preventing a PPP victory.

In 2012, the Supreme Court of Pakistan recognized substantial evidence of rigging in the 1990 elections.

• 1997 Pakistani general elections

In 1997, Nawaz Sharif won the election, securing 137 out of 217 National Assembly of Pakistan seats, while Benazir Bhutto's Pakistan People's Party (PPP) saw its seats dramatically reduce from 89 to 18. The PPP's decline was influenced by factors including the assassination of Benazir's brother Murtaza Bhutto, allegations of corruption against Benazir Bhutto's husband Asif Ali Zardari, and a crackdown on the PPP following the dismissal of Benazir Bhutto's government and subsequent actions against PPP affiliates.

Journalist and historian Nadeem F. Paracha and journalist Tahir Mehdi have highlighted the 1997 elections' controversial aspects. The crackdown on the PPP and the narrative of corruption against Zardari were key factors contributing to Sharif's overwhelming parliamentary majority. International observers from the European Union and the Commonwealth of Nations said the election met basic conditions but would not describe it as 'free and fair'.

• 2002 Pakistani general election

In 2002, Pakistan's political dynamics shifted when Pervez Musharraf, holding dual roles as Army Chief and President, conducted elections.The event was notable for the direct involvement of military influence in the electoral process, a contrast to previous instances of behind-the-scenes manipulation.

The elections resulted in a victory for the PML-Q, a party established shortly before the elections, consisting of politicians primarily drawn from traditional political parties such as the PPP and PML-N. To further control the political landscape, the Musharraf-led government introduced the Political Parties Order, 2002, imposing criteria that effectively disqualified the leadership of the PPP and the PML-N from participating in the elections. The administrative machinery, from the police to vote counters, was reportedly aligned with state interests, suggesting widespread rigging.

• 2002 Pakistani referendum

The referendum was seen by many as a sham or fixed. Opposition parties including the PPP and the Pakistan Muslim League referred to Musharraf's decision to hold a referendum as inappropriate and urged citizens to boycott the vote. In response, the voting age was lowered from 21 to 18 and the number of polling stations significantly increased, whilst ID cards were not required for people to cast a vote.

• 2018 Pakistani general election

The 2018 elections were a turning point in Pakistan's political history, with the two dynastic parties, the PPP, and the PML(N) no longer winning the general election, with the PTI taking most of the seats.

Despite the PTI's chairman Imran Khan, calling the general elections the most "fairest" in the country's history, the opposition allege that the election was rigged in favour of the PTI. This is due to the fact that the Result Transmission System suddenly failed, allegedly to rig it in favour of the PTI.

PML-N supporters blame the army for orchestrating their defeat, and protests accused the army of "terrorism", including in Rawalpindi, not far from the army's headquarters.

• 2024 Pakistani general election

The 2024 elections happened amidst allegations of pre-poll rigging by the military establishment in favour of the coalition led by Nawaz Sharif's PML-N. It was also dubbed as the most rigged election in the history of Pakistan with social media users calling it the "generals' elections".

Prior to the election, the Election Commission of Pakistan (ECP) and the Supreme Court of Pakistan banned the usage of the PTI's electoral symbol, the cricket bat, forcing its members to run as 'independent' candidates.

On election day, the Pakistan Telecommunication Authority shut down internet access nationwide. The PTI accused the body of suppressing its presence on social media.

On the day after the elections, at 2 AM, the ECP was supposed to begin to release the provisional results for national and provincial constituencies. The first accounts showed the PTI winning overwhelmingly, achieving two thirds of the National and Punjab Provincial Assembly seats. In the early morning, the system crashed. The transmission of data was frozen when publicly released results reached around 60% to 85% of the vote tallying for most constituencies. When the system resumed, the updated accounts were found to be greatly inconsistent with the previous ones. The PML-N, the clear winner on 30 constituencies and still competing on 10 Punjab Assembly seats, suddenly came up winning in about 137 seats in total. On 16 February, in a press conference, PML-N spokeswoman Marriyum Aurangzeb stated that all Form 45s produced on social media as proof of fraud allegations were fake.

On 17 February, Commissioner of Rawalpindi Division, Liaquat Ali Chattha, called a press conference to declare he felt compelled by conscience to publicity confess his complicity on electoral rigging by returning officers under his command to manipulate results for at least 13 candidates. Furthermore, he blamed the Chief Justice and the ECP's Chief Commissioner as primarily responsible for the ongoing events and that they should be prosecuted. ECP officials denied the accusations classing then as unfounded and motivated by self-promotion, adding that a divisional commissioner had no direct role in the electoral process. However, on 22 February, Chattha, while under arrest, retracted his claims and apologized to the ECP, claiming that the PTI "offered strong position" for making the allegations and saying that Qazi Faiz Isa's position as Chief Justice "was taken to create mistrust in general public against him".

Foreign media, observer groups and other countries and organizations including the United States, the United Kingdom and the European Union have voiced their concerns about the fairness of the elections. The Balochistan Bar Association stated, amidst widespread multiparty protests in the province, that the 2024 elections were "a deep conspiracy against the supremacy of constitution and law".

== See also ==
- Corruption charges against Benazir Bhutto and Asif Ali Zardari
- VIP culture in Pakistan
- National Accountability Bureau
- Nationalisation in Pakistan
- Periods of stagflation in Pakistan
- Privatisation in Pakistan
