= Shahid Ashraf =

Pakistan navy

Commodore Shahid Ashraf SBt
- Born: 1947; British India (present-day Pakistan)
- Military career
- Allegiance: Pakistan
- Branch: Pakistan Navy
- Service years: 1964–1998
- Rank: Commodore
- Nickname: Commodore S. Ashraf
- Service number: PN No. 1173
- Unit: Naval Operations Branch
- Commands: DG Naval Intelligence (DGNI); Navy Hydrographic Department
- Conflicts: Indo-Pakistani War of 1965; Indo-Pakistani War of 1971
- Awards: Sitara-e-Basalat

Shahid Ashraf SBt (born 1947), is a retired Pakistani naval officer and former spy whose role was central in a massive military scandal took place during the second administration of Prime Minister Benazir Bhutto.

He was accused of receiving monetary corruption when he led the Naval Intelligence office under the staff of Admiral Mansurul Haq, the Chief of Naval Staff from 1994 until 1997. He was subsequently court-martial but his matter was later subjected to cover-up by the Pakistani military under the Chairman Joint Chiefs of Staff General Pervez Musharraf in 1999.

== Biography ==
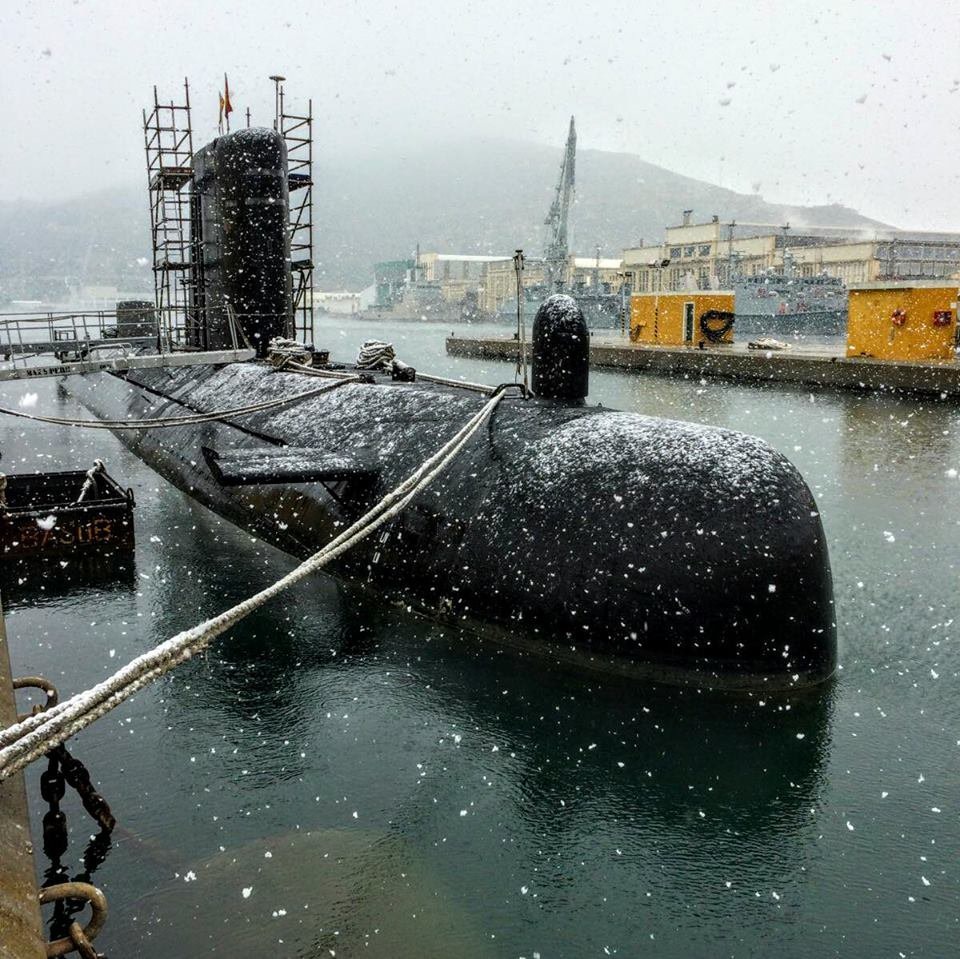
The Agosta 70A of the Spanish Navy in 2017. Ashraf reportedly accepted a bribe of ₨. 1.5 million.

Shahid Ashraf was born in early 1947 months before the independence of Pakistan and partition of India, and joined the Pakistan Navy in 1964. He participated in both the Indo-Pakistani War of 1965 and the Indo-Pakistani War of 1971.

In 1995, Captain Ashraf was appointed to the Naval Headquarters (NHQ) and was appointed as the Hydrographer of the Navy Hydrographic Department under then-Admiral Mansurul Haq, the Chief of Naval Staff.

In 1996, Captain Ashraf was promoted to one-star rank and was subsequently appointed as the Director-General of the Naval Intelligence.

During this time, Commodore Ashraf was briefed by Naval Intelligence, led by Rear-Admiral Javed Iqbal, on the Navy receiving massive illegal financial credits from the French Navy under the auspices of Admiral Mansurul Haq. Ashraf later confronted Haq, but joined the latter when Haq subsequently pressured him, according to the official inquiry of Naval Intelligence. In 1997, Ashraf handed over command of Naval Intelligence to Rear-Admiral Tanvir Ahmed and traveled to Great Britain to attend the war course at the Royal College of Defence Studies.

In 1997, Ahmed eventually exposed the military scandal after he led the arrests of Mansurul Haq and later wound up his operation when he requested the government to recall Commodore Ashraf from his overseas studies. The Navy JAG prosecution leveled charges against Ashraf of receiving ₨. 1.5 million when he faced a court-martial at Zafar Naval base in Islamabad. In 1998, Ashraf, along with Captains Liaquat Ali Malik and Z.U. Alvi, pleaded guilty of taking the bribes and was sentenced to imprisonment for nearly seven years. However, Ashraf maintained in the court-martial that he had sought permission of leading an attempt to catch the foreign agent who was giving bribe money to naval officers, but was not allowed to do so by the NHQ.

His case findings were later subjected to a military cover-up by Chairman Joint Chiefs General Pervez Musharraf in 2000 from the inquiries of the National Accountability Bureau.

In 2010, Ashraf later blamed the outcomes of the scandals on the successive government led by Prime Minister Nawaz Sharif and senior naval officers in the NHQ, but declined to comment his role in receiving ₨. 1.5 million. He claimed that the corruption charges leveled against the Bhutto-Zardari family, were politically motivated when the Sharif family was the largest beneficiary of the Agosta submarine deals.

== Awards and decorations ==

Medals information

Sitara-e-Basalat (Star of Good Conduct) 1990		Sitara-e-Harb 1971 War (War Star 1971)	
Tamgha-e-Jang 1971 War (War Medal 1971)	10 Years Service Medal	20 Years Service Medal	30 Years Service Medal
Tamgha-e-Sad Saala Jashan-e- Wiladat-e-Quaid-e-Azam (100th Birth Anniversary of Muhammad Ali Jinnah) 1976	Hijri Tamgha (Hijri Medal) 1979	Jamhuriat Tamgha (Democracy Medal) 1988	Qarardad-e-Pakistan Tamgha (Resolution Day Golden Jubilee Medal) 1990
