= Abaidullah Khan =

Pakistani admiral and bureaucrat (born 1939)

Vice Admiral Abaidullah Khan HI(M) SBt SJ
- عبيد اللہ خان

Chairman of the National Shipping Corporation
- In office 29 December 1996 – 3 November 2000
- Preceded by: Jawaid Ali
- Succeeded by: S. Tauquir H. Naqvi

Personal details
- Born: 1939 (age 86–87) Kashmir, British India
- Occupation: Bureaucrat
- Profession: Sailor
- Nickname(s): A. U. Khan; Obaidullah Khan

Military service
- Allegiance: Pakistan
- Branch/service: Pakistan Navy
- Years of service: 1958–2000
- Rank: Vice-Admiral (PN No. 775)
- Unit: Executive Branch
- Commands: Vice Chief of Naval Staff; Commander Pakistan Fleet; DCNS (Operations); Submarine Command
- Battles/wars: India–Pakistan war of 1965; India–Pakistan war of 1971

Abaidullah Khan (Note: Urdu: عبيد اللہ خان) (born 1939) known as A. U. Khan, is a Pakistani former three-star rank officer in the Pakistan Navy. After retiring, he became a bureaucrat and played a crucial role in procuring and technology transfer of the air-independent propulsion-based Agosta 90Bravo class submarine from France in 1994–1997.

== Early life ==
Abaidullah Khan was born in 1939 in Kashmir and was commissioned in the Navy in 1958 as Midshipman with S/No. PN. 775 in the Executive Branch. He was of the Kashmiri Pathan descent who lost both of his parents at the age of nine during the Indian partition and the first war with India in 1947, and was cared in the foster home.

He later joined the Submarine Command and was trained in PNS Hangor in France in 1966–1969. In 1971, Lt-Cdr. A.U. Khan was serving as the Second in Command of PNS Hangor, when it was deployed in the Arabian Sea, serving on the Western front of the third war with India. Alongside Lt. Fasih Bokhari, Lt-Cdr. Khan was instrumental in the control room to identify the exact coordinates and positions of Indian warships that ultimately sank INS Khurki under the command of Capt. M.N. Mulla.

After the war, Lt-Cdr. Khan was honored with the gallantry award and attended a course on War studies at the National Defence University, Islamabad, eventually gaining Master of Science in 1980.

In 1980s, Cdre. A.U. Khan commanded the Squadron as its officer in tactical command. Cdre. Khan was later attached as a Naval attache to the Royal Navy at the High Commission of Pakistan, London.

In 1993–1994, Rear-Admiral A.U. Khan was promoted to Fleet Commander Commander, Pakistan Fleet, where he was instrumental in providing the strong advocacy for acquiring the whole squadron of the Type-21 frigates from the Royal Navy, attending the ceremony with British Vice Admiral Roy Newman, the Flag Officer Plymouth, who handed over the Ambuscade that was designated as Tariq as the lead ship. In 1994, R-Adm. Khan took over the command of the Submarine Command and was posted as the DCNS (Operations) at the Navy NHQ.

In 1994, Adm. Saeed Mohammad Khan selected R-Adm. Khan as the head of the second team that visited France while the first team under R-Adm. Javed Iftikhar visited United Kingdom to acquire the imported submarines. It was reported in media that R-Adm A.U. Khan provided his strong lobbying and advocacy for acquiring the AIP technology from France through the technology transfer rather than acquiring the Upholder from the United Kingdom. R-Adm. Khan who was trained in French submarine had played a pivotal role in convincing the government of acquiring the AIP technology from France on a long-term strategic view, and this extremely controversial contract was eventually signed in 1994 with France despite Adm. Saeed Mohammad Khan's urgings.

In 1995, Vice-Admiral Khan was elevated as Vice Chief of Naval Staff, and was taken as secondment by Benazir Bhutto's administration as chairman of the Pakistan National Shipping Corporation (PNSC) in 1996, which he served through service extension until 2000 when he retired from his 42 year long military service.

In 2001–02, V-Adm. A.U. Khan was placed in Exit Control List by the Ministry of Interior due to his leading role in negotiating the deal to procure the technology of the Agosta–90Bravo class submarines, though his name was immediately cleared out by the government, citing mistakes.

In 2018, V-Adm. Khan participated as a chief guest the in celebration "to honor the submarine to eulogize the events in 1971", while inspecting the submarine museum, Pakistan Naval Museum in Karachi.

== See also ==
- Chief of Naval Staff (Pakistan)
