= Javed Iqbal (admiral) =

Pakistani admiral

Vice Admiral Jawaid Iqbal HI(M) SBt

Pakistan Ambassador to Tunisia
- In office 1998–2004
- President: Rafiq Tarar
- Prime Minister: Nawaz Sharif
- Preceded by: Shamoon Allam
- Succeeded by: Masood Khan

Personal details
- Born: Jawaid Iqbal; 31 March 1942 (age 84) Jullundhar, Punjab, British India (now Jalandhar, Punjab, India)
- Citizenship: Pakistan
- Party: Pakistan Tehreek-e-Insaf (1999–2011)
- Occupation: Activist; politician
- Profession: Naval officer; political analyst
- Website: Facebook page

Military service
- Allegiance: Pakistan
- Branch: Pakistan Navy
- Service years: 1961–1998
- Rank: Vice Admiral
- Unit: Executive Branch
- Commands: Pakistan Fleet (COMPAK); Commander Karachi (COMKAR); DG Joint Trig at JS HQ; DCNS (Personnel); DG Naval Intelligence (DGNI); Special Service Group (Navy)
- Conflicts: India–Pakistan war of 1965; India–Pakistan war of 1971
- Awards: Hilal-i-Imtiaz Sitara-e-Basalat

Jawaid Iqbal (Urdu: جاويد اقبال; born 31 March 1942) is a retired three-star-admiral of the Pakistan Navy, politician, and diplomat who served as the Ambassador of Pakistan to Tunisia from 1998 to 2004. The Government of Pakistan conferred the Sitara-e-Basalat and Hilal-i-Imtiaz awards on Iqbal for his contributions to the nation.

He is known for his support for civilian control of the army and opposition to the military takeover of the civilian government in 1999. He actively supports anti-corruption activities, and has served as the Vice-Chairman of the Pakistan Tehreek-e-Insaf for this cause. However, he later resigned amid inter-party conflict, especially with views on former President Musharraf.

== Early life and education ==
Javaid Iqbal was born on 31 March 1942 in Jalandhar, Punjab, in British Indian. He belongs to a Rajput family. After the partition of India in 1947, Iqbal emigrated to Pakistan and settled in Lahore, Punjab.

After he did his matriculation in 1961 from a local high school in Lahore, Iqbal joined the Pakistan Navy and was directed to join the Pakistan Military Academy. He received training at the Royal Naval Academy in England and the Royal Navy as a surface officer.

== Military career ==
He was commissioned in 1964 and was appointed in the Pakistan Navy as a Sub-Lieutenant posted at the Executive Branch of the Navy. He participated in the Indo-Pakistani War of 1965 as an officer on a surface warship.

In 1966, he entered the elite Navy Special Service Group and was selected to be trained with the U.S. Navy SEALs in the United States as a frogman, where he learned high-altitude parachuting and scuba diving. In 1971, Iqbal served in the western front of the third war with India.

After the 1971 war, Iqbal attended the National Defence University in Islamabad, where he obtained an MSc. in Strategic Studies. He later went to the United States and graduated from the Naval War College. Upon returning, he served on the faculty of the Naval War College in Lahore.

=== War and command appointments in the Navy ===
From 1983 to 1986, Iqbal was posted with the Pakistan Armed Forces–Middle East, where he served as a naval adviser to the Qatari Emiri Navy and, later, as military adviser to the Qatari government. In 1989, Captain Iqbal assumed the command of the PNS Badr, where he served as a commanding officer until the warship was returned to the United States. In 1990–1991, Iqbal was posted with the Ministry of Defence (MoD) and was selected to serve as a naval adviser at the High Commission of Pakistan in New Delhi.

In 1992, he was promoted as one-star admiral, Cdre. He served as a commanding officer of the elite Special Services Group Navy until he was appointed as the director naval intelligence in 1992.

==== Director Naval Intelligence and Agosta scandal ====
In 1992, Rear-Admiral Iqbal was appointed as Director-General of the Naval Intelligence (DGNI). He was among the officers who investigated the rumors surrounding a controversial arms deal signed with France as early as 1994 to 1995. Based on an accidental tip and reference received in sting intelligence, Iqbal eventually met with Zafar Iqbal in Karachi and arrested him to reveal information about the parties that were being paid among public and military officials. Iqbal briefed his findings to Cdre. Shahid Ashraf.

While commenting on his service-promotion, Iqbal, after retiring from his military service, reportedly said to news reporters: "Adm. Saeed Khan was the real person to take away big chunk of the deal because the deal was implemented in his tenure."

=== Staff appointment and ambassadorship to Tunisia ===
Iqbal was appointed as the DCNS (Personnel) at the Navy NHQ and was later posted as the director of the Joint Training (DG Trig.) at the JS HQ in Rawalpindi. Apart from serving as the commander of the Karachi Coastal Command and Pakistan Fleet Command from 1994 to 1998, Iqbal also served on a command level.

In 1998, Iqbal decided to retire from the Navy, and was eventually appointed as the Ambassador of Pakistan to Tunisia until 2004.

He continued serving in the Foreign Service despite opposing the military takeover of the civilian government.

== Political career ==
=== Pakistan Tehreek-e-Insaf (2004–2012) ===
In 2004, Iqbal returned to Lahore where he joined the Pakistan Tehreek-e-Insaf (PTI). Through the party platform, he supported the civilian control of the military and writ of the constitution in the country.

In 2011, he criticised the Pakistan military's failure to realize the nature of the compound in Abbottabad where the United States eventually conducted an operation to find Osama bin Laden.

While serving as Vice-Chairman of Pakistan Tehreek-e-Insaf (PTI), he resigned from his position and left the party in an effort to oppose Khurshid Kasuri's support for Pervez Musharraf.

He is currently residing in Lahore, and has raised his concerns about the trials of Pervez Musharraf for illegally taking over the civilian government in 1999.

== Writings ==
In addition to his naval career, Admiral Javed Iqbal has contributed to written discourse on maritime affairs, national security, leadership, and strategic studies. His writings primarily focus on issues related to naval strategy, maritime security in the Indian Ocean region, civil–military relations, and Pakistan’s geostrategic environment. Iqbal has written articles and opinion pieces for Pakistani English-language newspapers and defence-oriented publications, including The Nation.
