= Mansurul Haq =

Pakistani admiral (1937–2018)

- منصور الحق

8th Chief of Naval Staff
- In office 10 November 1994 – 1 May 1997
- Preceded by: Saeed Mohammad Khan
- Succeeded by: Fasih Bokhari

Chairman of Pakistan National Shipping Corporation
- In office 17 August 1992 – 6 November 1994

Personal details
- Born: 16 October 1937 Sialkot, Punjab, British India
- Died: 21 February 2018 (aged 80) United States
- Citizenship: Pakistan

Military service
- Allegiance: Pakistan
- Branch/service: Pakistan Navy
- Years of service: 1954–1997
- Rank: Admiral (stripped)
- Unit: Naval Operations Branch
- Commands: Commander Pakistan Fleet; Commander Karachi; DG Joint Training at JS HQ; DCNS (Personnel) at NHQ; DG Naval Intelligence East
- Battles/wars: Indo-Pakistani War of 1965; Indo-Pakistani War of 1971; Bangladesh Liberation War
- Awards: Nishan-e-Imtiaz (Military) (withdrawn); Hilal-e-Imtiaz (Military) (withdrawn); Sitara-e-Basalat (withdrawn); Turkish Legion of Merit; Order of AbdulAziz; Bintang Jalasena Utama

Mansurul Haq (Note: Urdu: منصور الحق) (16 October 1937 – 21 February 2018) was a senior officer of the Pakistan Navy who was forcibly retired from his service in 1997 on the allegations leveled against him in the corruption and kickbacks resulting during the technology transfer of submarines from France. He was stripped of his rank, awards, and other perks and privileges.

Driving a policy on anti-corruption by the Prime Minister Nawaz Sharif, the Naval Intelligence exposed his role that led to his resignation on 1 May 1997. His case attracted subsequent media attention in Pakistan after his voluntary return without any extradition case from the United States by the joint teams of FIA and NAB. He was held in Sihala Prison to face accountability.

However, Haq was later released after successfully negotiating a plea bargain. In 2013, he later filed a lawsuit against the Government of Pakistan at the Sindh High Court, seeking to restore his rank and other privileges.

== Biography ==
Mansurul Haq was born in Sialkot, Punjab, British India in 1937 into a Punjabi family. After his matriculation in Sialkot, he briefly attended the Murray College and was commissioned in the Pakistan Navy in 1954 as Midshipman.

In 1954, he was sent to the United Kingdom where he attended the Britannia Royal Naval College in Dartmouth in England, graduated in geography course in 1956. In 1957, he did his further military training at HMS Excellent in Portsmouth where he specialized as gunnery specialist, returned to Pakistan before being promoted as sub-lieutenant in the Navy in 1958. In 1964–65, Lt. Haq served in the second war with India and was posted in East Pakistan after the war.

In 1969–71, Lieutenant-Commander Haq was posted in East Pakistan where he was the Director of the Naval Intelligence, fighting a war against India in December 1971. He was taken as war prisoner by Indian Army and was repatriated back to Pakistan following the trilateral agreement signed in 1974.

His career progressed extremely well in the Navy and was sent to attend the Naval War College in Rhode Island in the United States where he graduated in management course. In 1983, Captain Haq was promoted to one-star assignment in the Navy NHQ, and Cdre Haq briefly tenured as the ACNS (Ops). In 1985–89, Cdre Haq served in the Ministry of Defence and later as Director of Joint Training at the JS HQ before being promoted to two-star assignment, and Rear-Admiral Haq was made a senior fleet commander as Commander Pakistan Fleet (COMPAK), and later as Commander Karachi (COMKAR) in 1991–92.

Haq died from a cardiac arrest at his home in the United States, on 21 February 2018, at the age of 80.

== Chief of Naval Staff ==
In 1992, Rear-Admiral Haq was promoted to three-star assignment and was appointed as secondment at the National Shipping Corporation (PNSC) by then-Chief of Naval Staff Admiral S.M. Khan. However, his chairmanship was caught between the privatization policy led by then-Prime Minister Nawaz Sharif and Admiral S.M. Khan, when a civilian bureaucrat filed a petition against his tenureship at the Sindh High Court.

Vice-Admiral Haq fiercely opposed any attempts of privatization policy, causing a stress on the civil-military relations with the civilian federal government. In 1992, Vice-Admiral Haq announced to sell off the old metal scrap that would raise the revenue of US$50–60 million to buy new cargo ships.

In 1994, Prime Minister Benazir Bhutto publicly announced to promote Vice-Admiral Haq as a four-star admiral in the Navy, appointing him as the Chief of Naval Staff. The promotion came with controversy since Vice-Admiral Mansur was due retirement a month before the change was due.

Although, it was Admiral Saeed Mohammad Khan who had given a go-ahead of procuring the technology transfer of the Agosta 90B submarines in 1994 against his discretionary and wanting to directly procure the Victoria-class submarines. Admiral Haq, nonetheless oversaw the financial deals closed in between the Benazir administration and the administrations of Mitterrand and Chirac in 1994–97. In 1995, Adm. Haq held additional talks with the French Navy over the strengthening of the cooperation between two nations.

== Dismissal and extradition ==
In 1996–97, the Naval Intelligence led by Rear-Admiral Tanvir Ahmed began investigating the allegations and rumors at the Navy NHQ surrounding the role of Admiral S.M. Khan and Admiral Haq. The whole nation became completely aware of the scandal in 1998, when the scandal was exposed.

In driving the anti-corruption policy by then-Prime Minister Nawaz Sharif, Admiral Haq's role was exposed by R-Adm Tanvir Ahmed, and was forced retired from his four-star commission in 1997. The Naval Police and officials of the Naval Intelligence led by R-Adm. Tanvir Ahmed arrested Admiral Haq but no evidence came out to convict him in 1998.

In 1998, Haq emigrated to the United States and settled in Austin in Texas where he bought a house. In 1999, the National Accountability Bureau (NAB) announced to open the investigations on Agosta scandal, with French Tracfin aiding the investigations, where major breakthrough in the investigation was made in 2000–01.

In 2001, the anti-corruption courts issued the arrest warrants, and President Pervez Musharraf negotiated with the U.S. President George Bush for his extradition to Pakistan. The Texas Ranger detained him in Texas, and extradited him to Pakistan on 17 April 2001. While Haque had a right to fight for his extradition, he choose not to.

=== Lawsuits, imprisonment and release ===
In 2001, the Accountability Court inducted Haq in receiving commissions and kickbacks worth $3.369 million in defence deals. Civilian prosecution also leveled charges on him of being involved in financial deals made through selling the metal scrap through the National Shipping Corporation (PNSC), which caused the PNSC to lose $3 million in national exchequer. In 2004, the anti-corruption court sentenced him in rigorous seven-year rigorous imprisonment and fined ₨.2 million. Upon being convicted, the naval police shifted him in the Sihala Prison in Punjab in Pakistan but soon began his negotiation with the Government of Pakistan to return the money as plea bargain in exchange of light sentence and minimal jail time.

In 2003–05, Haq returned a total sum of $7.5 million while in office, which were immediately shifted back to Navy's national account. The amount was said to be enough to pay the salaries of entire navy for two years.

After transferring the amount back to Navy's account, Haq was released from the prison and all cases against him were closed as part of the deal, eventually settling in Karachi. He paid additional US$ 2.5 million which were deposited to Pakistan Navy's account in two easy installment payments, after which, he was released as the NAB agents vacated his house in Karachi.

In 2013, Haq filed a lawsuit against the Government of Pakistan, seeking to restore his medical privileges, pensions, and four-star rank, at the Sindh High Court. Chief Justice of Sindh High Court, Justice Faisal Arab (now serving as Justice in the Supreme Court of Pakistan), heard his appeal as Haq cited his 43 years of military service in the Navy who fought the two wars where he was taken war prisoner by India in 1971. In 2013, the Government of Pakistan agreed to restore his rank (as former) and limited medical pensions but not all benefits that are enjoyed by four-star officers in the Pakistani military.

== Aftermath of Agosta submarine scandal ==
=== Later revelation and subsequent knowledge ===
After the nationwide general elections held in 2008, which saw the Pakistan Peoples Party (PPP) forming the government and Asif Zardari elected as President, the knowledge on the Agosta submarines scandal became to emerge again, which brought several PPP politicians being involved in the scandal in public notice. Despite many investigative journalism reports and media airing the information gained on the Agosta submarines scandal, Haq remained silent and refused to appear on the news media.

Role of Adm. SM Khan and others were also implicated, including the role of Aamir Lodhi, an arms dealer based in France who is also brother of Maleeha Lodhi former Permanent Representative of Pakistan to the United Nations, she served from February 2015 to September 2019 .

Though, Adm. SM Khan denied his role in such deals as the latter wanted to purchase the Victoria-class submarines in 1994.

In 2010, Cdre Shahid Ashraf, the DG NI under Admiral Haq, revealed on the Dawn News that the submarine deal, for which Admiral Mansurul Haq pleaded guilty, was signed before he took charge as Chief of Naval Staff. Shahid Ashraf further claimed that Admiral Haq was not part of the selection team which recommended Agosta 90B for purchase from France. The selection was made during Admiral Saeed Mohammad Khan. The selection committee included various Admirals including those who subsequently held senior positions after Admiral Haq was removed from his position. However, Shahid Ashraf did not put forward any evidence that proved Haq's innocence.

In June 2010, French investigators raided the house of Amir Lodhi, and handed over the important documents relating the defence deals to the NAB. The reports confiscated by the French investigators revealed to have found in regards involvement of former President Asif Ali Zardari who had have received €33 million while Amir Lodhi's share was €2.9M.

About the case study and trial of the Haq, former chief of naval staff, Adm. Abdul Aziz Mirza reportedly quoted in the news media that "former Naval Chief Mansurul haq was not convicted of Agosta kickbacks but for the bribes he had pocketed in other defence deals."

== Awards and decorations ==

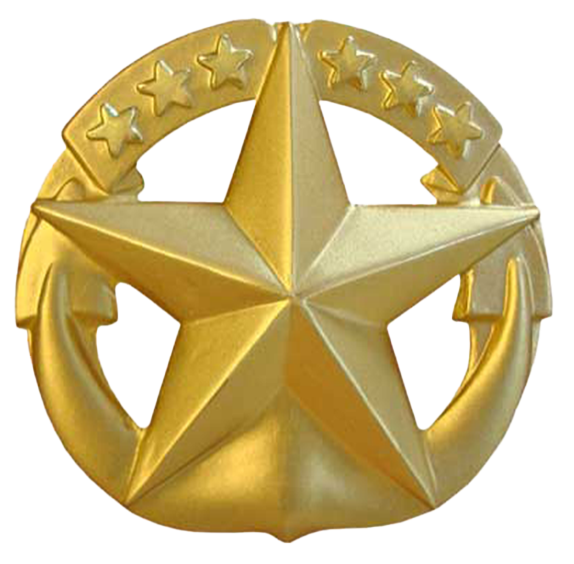

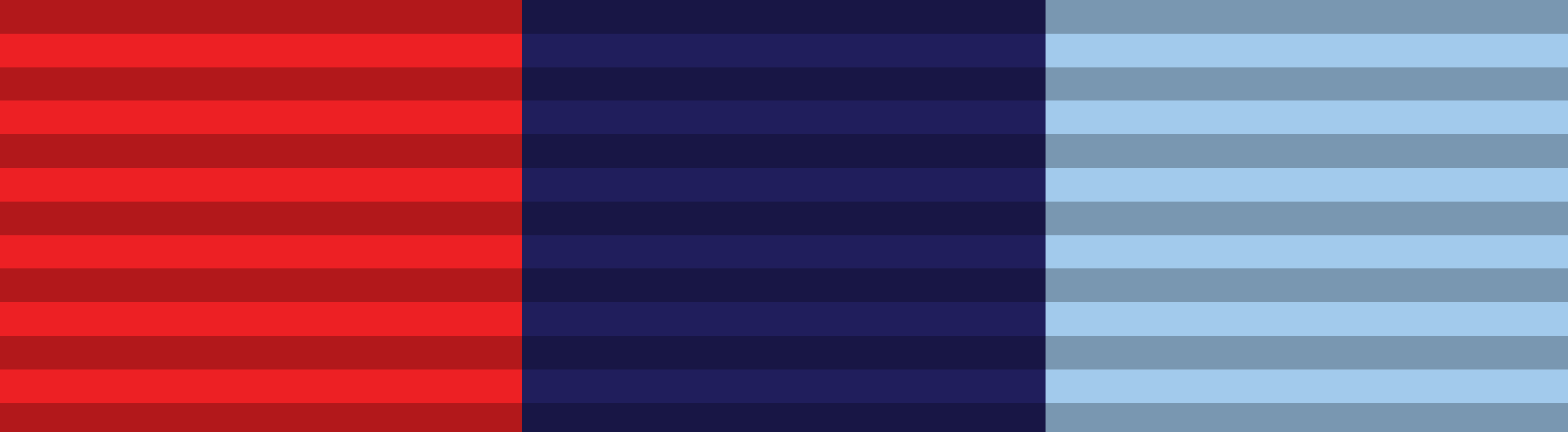

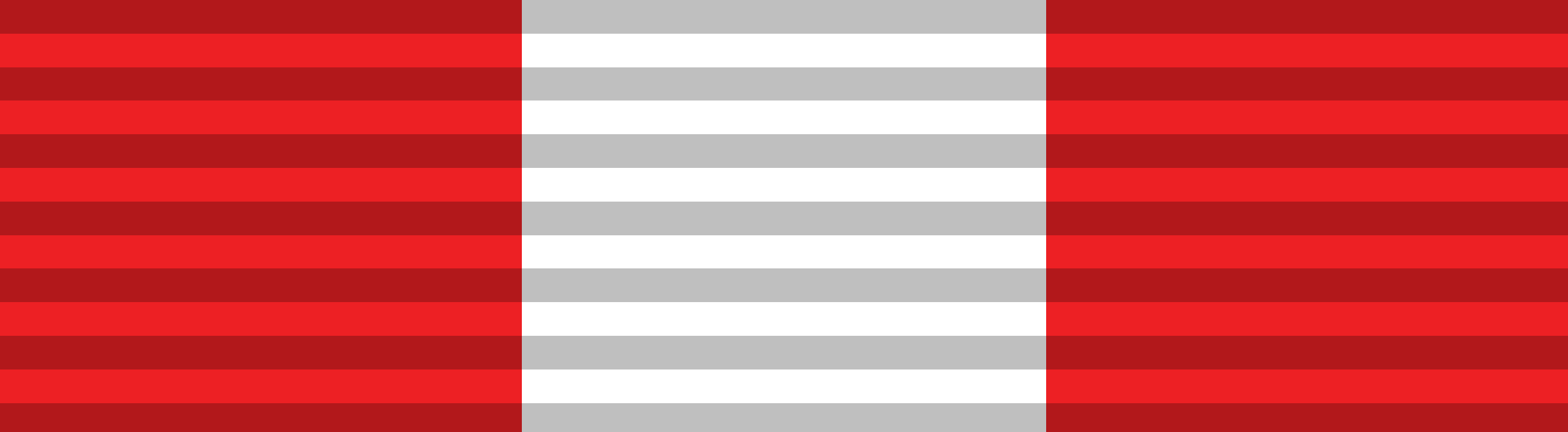

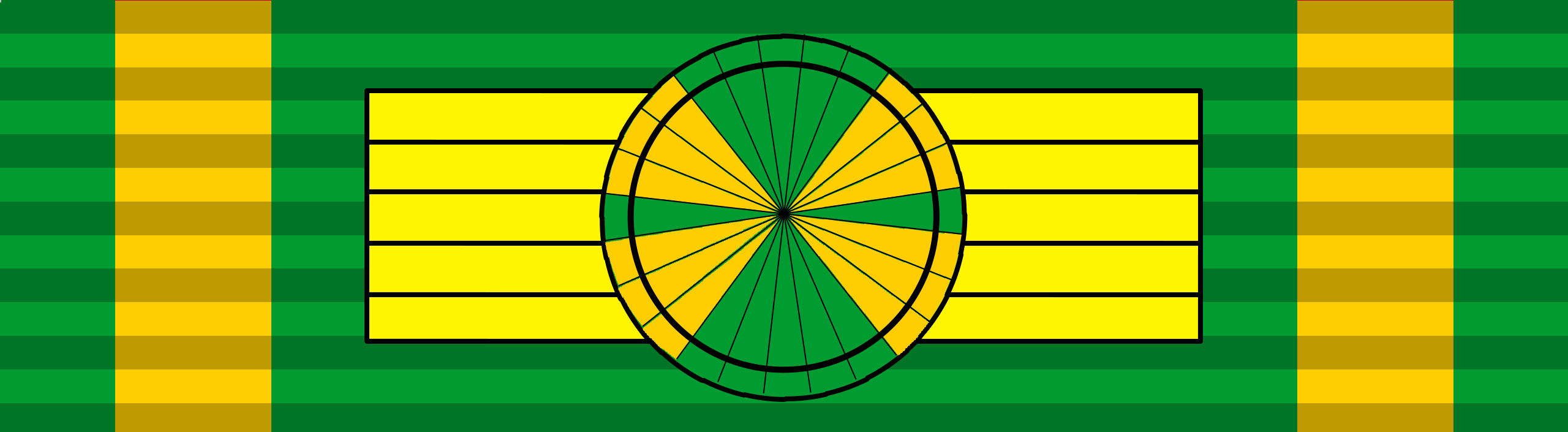

Pakistan Navy Operations Branch Badge
Command at Sea insignia
Nishan-e-Imtiaz (Military) (Order of Excellence) WITHDRAWN	Hilal-i-Imtiaz (Military) (Crescent of Excellence) WITHDRAWN	Sitara-e-Basalat (Star of Valour) WITHDRAWN	Tamgha-e-Diffa (Defence Medal)
Sitara-e-Harb 1965 War (War Star 1965)	Sitara-e-Harb 1971 War (War Star 1971)	Tamgha-e-Jang 1965 War (War Medal 1965)	Tamgha-e-Jang 1971 War (War Medal 1971)
10 Years Service Medal	20 Years Service Medal	30 Years Service Medal	40 Years Service Medal
Tamgha-e-Sad Saala Jashan-e-Wiladat-e-Quaid-e-Azam (100th Birth Anniversary of Muhammad Ali Jinnah) 1976	Tamgha-e-Qayam-e-Jamhuria (Republic Commemoration Medal) 1956	Hijri Tamgha (Hijri Medal) 1979	Tamgha-e-Jamhuriat (Democracy Medal) 1988
Qarardad-e-Pakistan Tamgha (Resolution Day Golden Jubilee Medal) 1990	Turkish Legion of Merit (Turkey)	Order of Abdulaziz al Saud (Saudi Arabia)	Bintang Jalasena Utama (Indonesia)

=== Foreign Decorations ===
Foreign Awards
Turkey	The Legion of Merit Turkey
Saudi Arabia	Order of King Abdulaziz
Indonesia	Bintang Jalasena Utama

== See also ==
- Agosta submarine scandal
- Corruption charges against Benazir Bhutto and Asif Ali Zardari
- Corruption in Pakistan
- Military scandals
- National Accountability Bureau

== Media coverage ==
- Reporters aired by Dawn News, in a host of Arshad Sharif.

Military offices
Preceded by Saeed Mohammad Khan	Chief of Naval Staff; 1994 – 1997	Succeeded by Fasih Bokhari
