= Karachi affair =

Political scandal in Pakistan

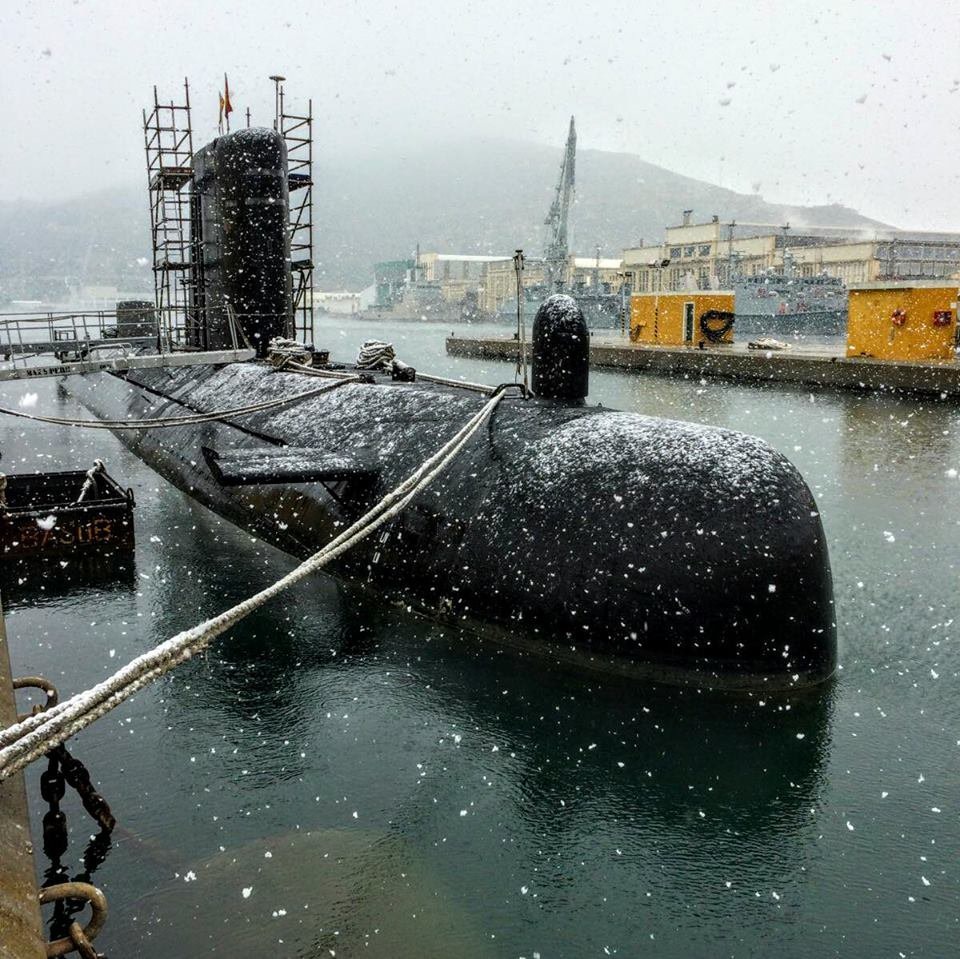
In the Picture: The Agosta 70A of Spanish Navy in 2017. The Agosta 90Bs are much larger and AIP-powered submarines.

The Karachi affair (French: affaire Karachi), otherwise known as Agosta Submarine scandal, was a major military scandal that took place in the second administration of Prime Minister Benazir Bhutto, involving the presidencies of François Mitterrand and Jacques Chirac in 1992–97.

The scandal involved the payment of massive commissions and kickbacks between France and Pakistan over the negotiations to acquire Agosta 90B-class submarines. The submarines utilized the emerging air-independent propulsion (AIP) proprietary designs, which Pakistan was eager to acquire over the nuclear submarines.

In 1992, the Benazir government began negotiating with French President François Mitterrand to procure the designs for the expensive and complex submarine, eventually signing the contract in 1994 for a sum equivalent to €826 million ($996m). Negotiations and the decision-making for defense procurement with France was extremely controversial, with the United Kingdom later entering in the competition by offering its four Upholder-class submarines, which were being decommissioned from the military service with the Royal Navy.

The Pakistan Navy NHQ wanted to procure the four used British-manufactured diesel-electric Upholder-class submarines, which were already available and at a lesser cost than newly build Agostas, which were still in the prototype phase, and would have taken years to manufacture and deliver. Nonetheless, the Benazir administration selected the Agosta, taking advantage of the lucrative financial credits provided by France.

Commissions of 6.25% of the contract, approximately €50 million, were paid out to the lobbying firms in Pakistan and France. Some €50m were allegedly paid as "sweeteners" to various senior Pakistan Navy admirals and officers as well as the political leaders. In 1996–97, the Naval Intelligence led by its Director-General, Rear-Admiral Tanvir Ahmed, secretly launched its investigations into this matter and began collecting physical evidence that eventually led to the exposure of Chief of Naval Staff, Admiral Mansurul Haq, in receiving massive monetary commissions in 1997. Massive media coverage and the news of the dismissals of one and two-star admirals tarnished the image of the Navy, with Admiral Fasih Bokhari, who took over the command of the Navy from Admiral Mansurul Haq, forced to attempt damage control of the situation.

In 1990s, it was legal in France to award monetary commissions and kickbacks to the political lobbyists involved in the bilateral deals until France began partied and ratified the OECD Convention that led to the outlawing the practice of awarding monetary commissions in 2000.

Since its exposure in the news media of both France and Pakistan, the scandal has been involved in various investigative journalism and attracted sensations and conspiracy theories in both countries, including this scandal's allegement of financing the political campaign of then-Prime Minister Edouard Balladur in the presidential elections took place in 1995. Upon electing President Jacques Chirac cancelled the commissions and kickbacks, angering many officials in Pakistan and France according to the media reports. Other theories and subsequent investigative journalist reports alleged that the bus bombing on 8 May 2002 in Karachi that killed eleven French engineers in Karachi was in retaliation for the cancellation of these commissions. This theory was rejected by the Government of Pakistan when the FIA and the CID made potential discovery in linking the HuM and the al-Qaeda had carried out the terrorist attack in Karachi, mistaking the French nationals for the Americans.

== Background ==
=== Negotiations and procurement ===
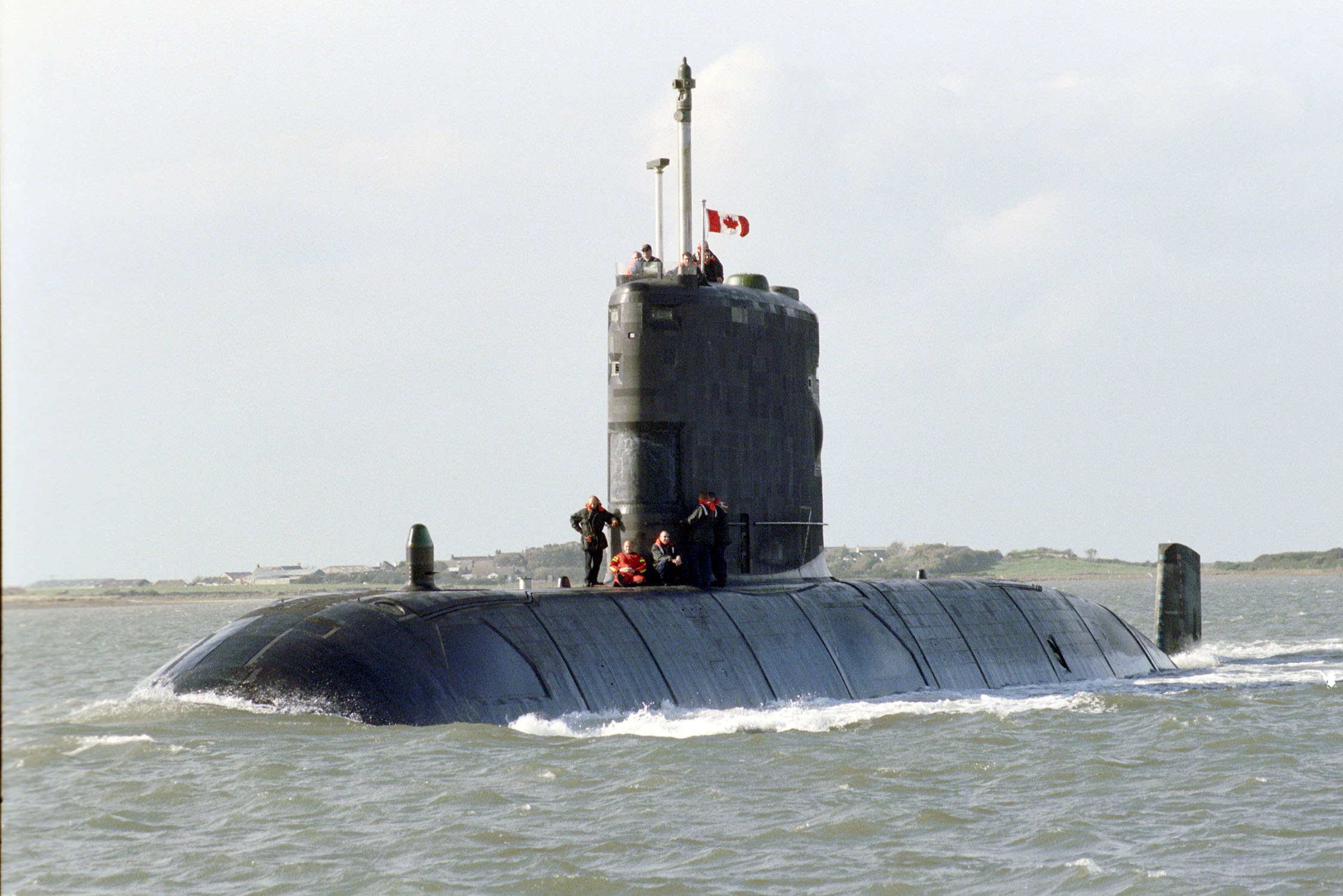
The Upholder class in 2006: In 1993 British First Sea Lord Admiral of the Fleet Sir Julian Oswald offered the immediate transfer of the four Upholder-class submarines to the Pakistan Navy.

Plans to replace the ageing Hangor-class diesel-electric submarines with nuclear submarines were aggressively pursued by then-Chairman of the Joint Chiefs of Staff Committee Admiral Iftikhar Ahmed Sirohey as a counter to Indian Navy activities in 1990. The motivation for procuring nuclear submarines was partly due to the Indian Navy's lease of the ageing K-43, a Charlie-class submarine, from the Soviet Union in 1990, and Chairman Joint chiefs Adm. Sirohey had been negotiating with the Chinese Navy to acquire the short-term lease for the submarine, Han. Pakistan abandoned talks with the Chinese Navy after the Indian contract with the Soviet Union was terminated over training issues and restrictions on Indian sailors accessing the missile control room and reactor compartment of the Charlie-class submarine.

In 1990, Pakistan entered in negotiation with Sweden, China, and France over the procurement and acquisition of submarines with air-independent propulsion as a substitute for nuclear-powered submarines. Sweden offered their Gotland-class submarines with an AIP technology, while China offered the diesel-electric, Type 035 submarines at a price tag of $US 180 million, which was $US 83 million cheaper than the French submarines. The Chinese offer was rejected partly due to Navy exploring the idea of acquiring AIP technology, despite the fact that more Chinese submarines were available to buy. Due to the expensive procurement of the Gotland class and that the Type 035 was comparatively outdated, the Navy abandoned their talks with Swedish and Chinese governments, and consequently the Pakistan government entered talks with the French government.

Upon hearing the news in 1992–93, the Chinese government reportedly offered to sell off their Han-class nuclear submarine at price tag of $63 million USD, which Pakistani war strategists were less enthusiastic due to the submarine's noise and performance as they view it as "less tactical advantage" for Pakistan.

Eventually, Pakistan entered in negotiation with France over the procurement of the Agosta-90Bravo submarines after the French designer, the DCNS, presented the Agosta 90B prototype in 1992. At this time, the personal connections between Chief of Naval Staff Admiral S. M. Khan and British First Sea Lord Admiral of the Fleet Sir Julian Oswald resulted in the British government selling the Type 21 frigates to Pakistan in 1993–94.

Learning that Pakistan was in the market for submarines, the Royal Navy entered in the competition by offering their four Upholder-class diesel-electric submarines to the Pakistan Navy, an offer which was favored by the naval chief Adm. S.M. Khan, who began lobbying for the British submarines over the French submarines.

The United Kingdom formally entered in the competition with France in 1993–94, offering their four British manufactured Upholder-class submarines, which were available to immediate transfer for a much lower price than the French offer. Although Admiral Khan favored procuring the British submarines, his Vice Chief of Naval Staff Vice-Admiral A. U. Khan had provided strong lobbying in the government of procuring the technology and proprietary designs of Agosta submarine from France rather than procuring the readily available British submarines. There was a strong lobby for French technology over the British technology, Rear-Admiral Fasih Bokhari, DCNS (Supply) and Rear-Admiral Aziz Mirza, then-Additional Secretary at the Ministry of Defense (MoD) also favored acquiring the Agosta 90Bravos over the Upholders.

When the retirement of Admiral S.M. Khan was confirmed in 1994, Aftab Mirani, the Defense Minister in the Bhutto government informed Adm. Khan that the final decision was for the acquisition of the French technology over the British second-hand submarines.

Other Nations in Submarine Competition

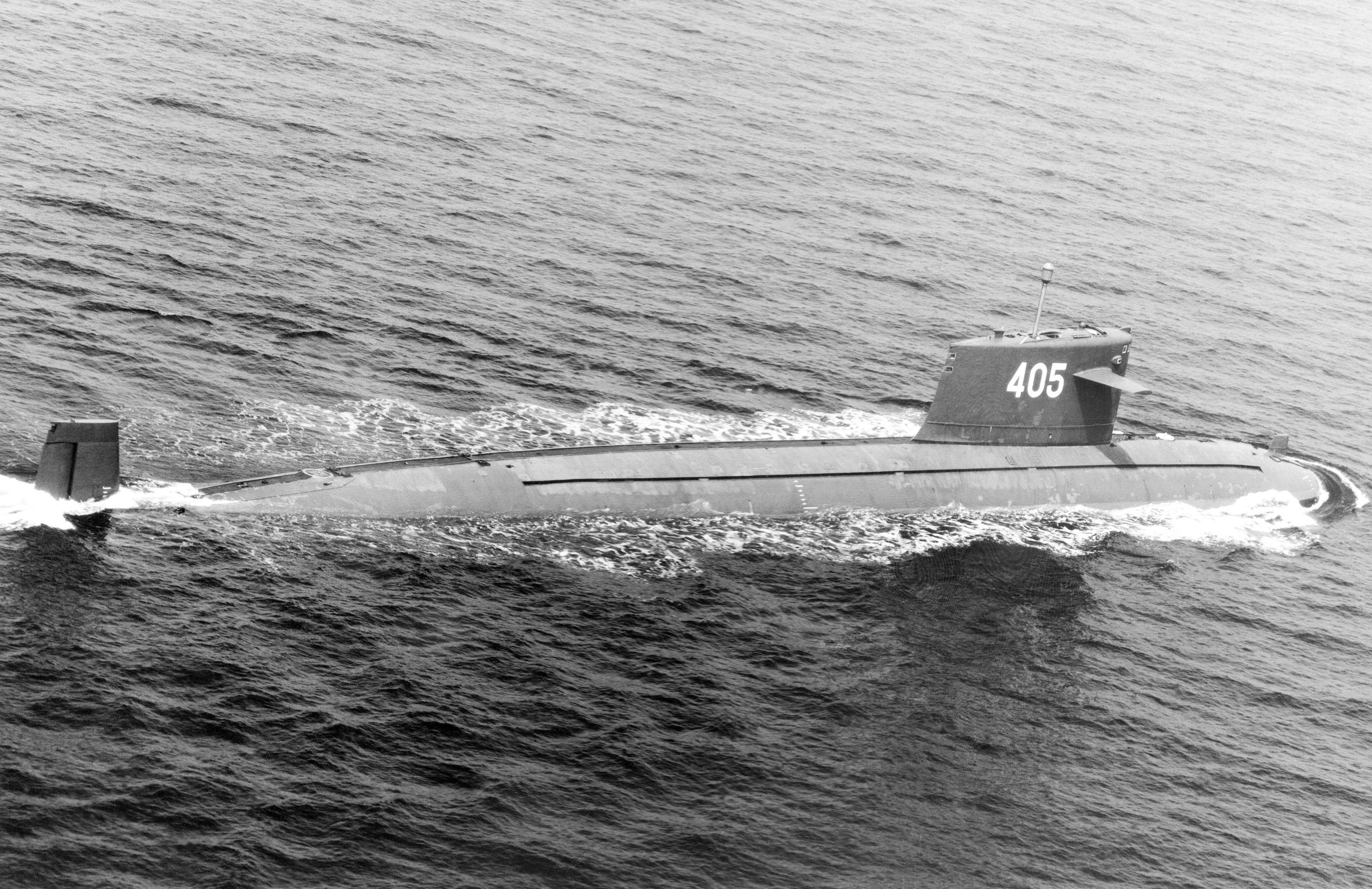
The Han-class nuclear submarine offered by China. Rejection by Navy due to their noise control issues despite being cheaper than Ming.

The Ming-class submarine offered by China. The Navy rejected the proposal due to focusing towards acquisition of air-independent propulsion.

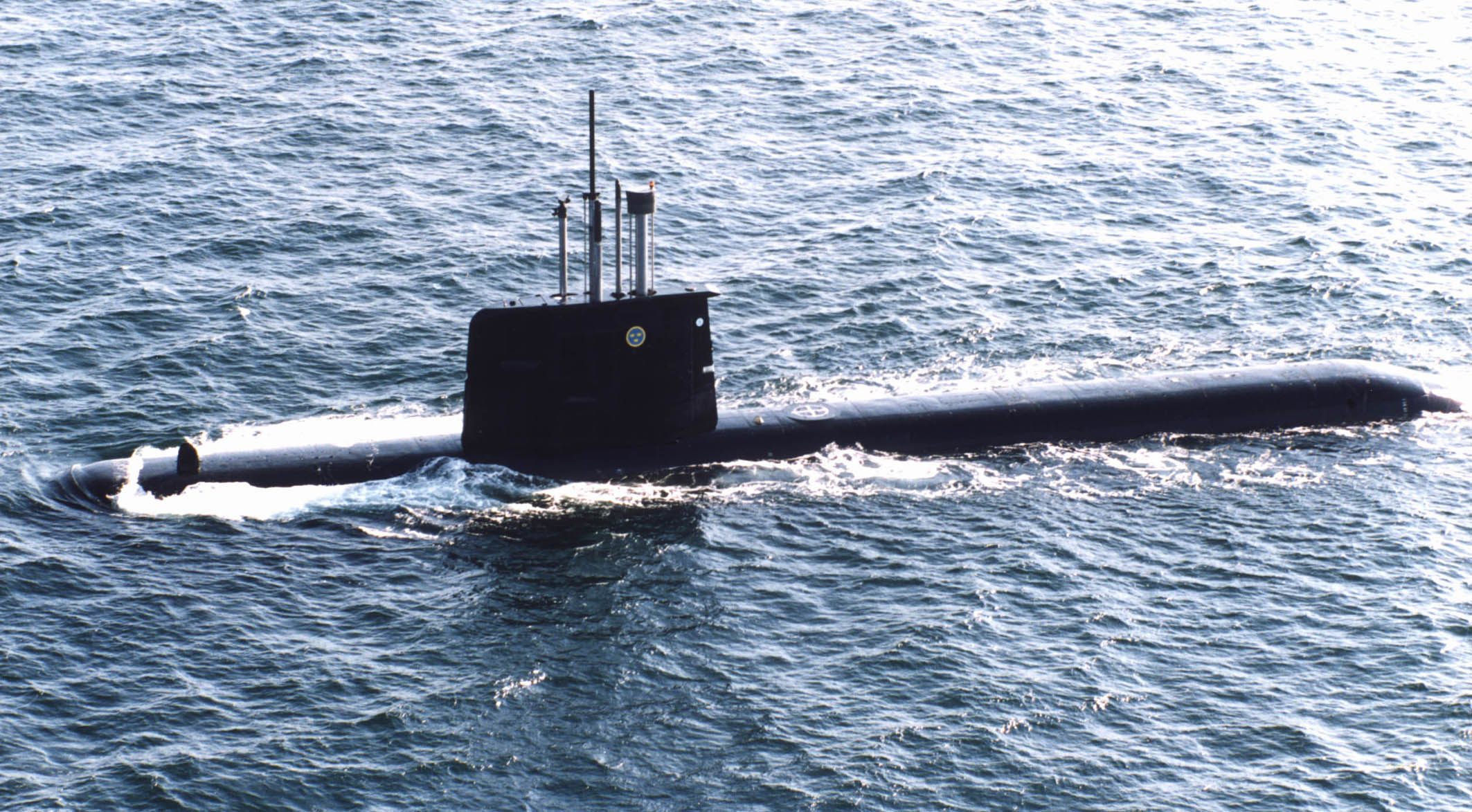
The Gotland-class submarine offered by Sweden. Initially interested, the Navy opted out from this deal due to the expensive procurement.

== Intermediaries, commissions, and kickbacks ==
In 1993, the Benazir government had been considering acquiring and commissioning the four diesel-electric Upholder-class submarines from the United Kingdom, which were made available after Pakistan had bought the Amazon-class frigates and commissioned them into the Pakistan Navy as the Tariq class in 1994.

With the Chief of Naval Staff Admiral S.M. Khan lobbying for the Upholder-class boats, which were available at a much lower price and in greater numbers than the French offer, others in his naval staff, including Vice Chief of Naval Staff (VCNS) V-Adm. A.U. Khan and R-Adm. Fasih Bokhari, the DCNS (Supply), who were submariners by profession and had trained in the French-built Hangor-class submarines, were on the idea of utilizing the air-independent propulsion technology that French Navy were offering.

Nonetheless, the Navy NHQ recommended that the Finance ministry and the Defence production ministry acquire the Upholder class which were then readily available, for a lower prince while the Agostas had yet to be built, and would have taken years to be delivered.

Upon hearing of the United Kingdom's offer, the French government offered extremely lucrative monetary offers and generous financial credits to the Pakistan government in its annual federal budgets if it selected the Agosta–90Bravo submarines, which had the additional advantage of keeping the "underemployed KSEW in Karachi" in employment and works.

Despite the strong political opposition by India over this deal in 1994, French President François Mitterrand and Prime Minister Benazir Bhutto signed off a submarine procurement deal that was initially budgeted at $520 million but the programme of technology transfer cost $950 million, for which France first provided loans that were to be paid in five to six years.

In 1994, the French government awarded the defence contracts to DCNS, Thales, Dassault Systèmes, as the French Navy's Forces Sous-marines took the responsibility of providing training to Pakistan Navy's submarine command (SUBCOM). In Pakistan, the entire contract was awarded to KSEW by the Government of Pakistan, that opened the employment opportunities in self-sustainability while issuing major tender offers to unemployed heavy machine industry, as private accounting firms were hired as civilian defense contractors to oversee the accounting and finances.

In 1994–96, the French government paid large amounts of commissions and kickbacks paid in Euros to lobbying firms in Pakistan and France as part of the common practice— a practice that the Pakistani government also followed to award commissions paid in Pakistan Rupees to naval officers and political figures to maintain the support of the program despite its cost. This policy was intended to "convince" political leaders and military officials, but such practices were declared illegal in France until the signing of the OECD Convention against Corruption in 2000.

The French state-owned consortium, the SOFEMA, channeled money to political and military officials through front companies and individuals in Pakistan and France. The names of the recipients are still kept as secret but the amounts are known and were reported to the French Ministry of Finance and Pakistan Ministry of Finance in 2000, as these commissions are 6.25% of the contract amount. The French newspaper, Libération, revealed that payments of SOFEMA continued until 2001, when they were stopped by former French President Jacques Chirac.

== Naval Intelligence and sting operations ==
As early as 1995, the Naval Intelligence had been tracking news of military officials being financially paid by France and Pakistan in a program overseen by the Chief of Naval Staff Adm. Mansurul Haq. Knowledge on commission being paid to the naval officials were exposed when Naval Intelligence's spy chief Rear-Admiral Javed Iqbal led the arrest of the project engineer, Capt. Z.U. Alvi at the Karachi Naval Dockyard, based on an accidental intelligence based on the sting operation. Capt. Alvi who confirmed his contacts with Zafar Iqbal, a defence contractor, and accepted "receiving millions of € and R$ in the briefcase(s)" only to be handed over to the interested military and political figures. Civilian defense contractor, Zafar Iqbal, was a businessman who had financial ties with the Bhutto-Zardari family and had access to the sensitive accounting departments linked to the Navy NHQ in Islamabad, which prompted the Naval Intelligence to conduct the further inquiry into business deals of Iqbal after receiving a reference from an anonymous naval officer.

The investigative leads, case studies, and the evidences were then compiled by the R-Adm. Javed Iqbal who passed it further to the acting director in 1995.

The Naval Intelligence, under acting director Cdre. Shahid Ashraf, did look into this matter but the efforts were hampered when Cdre. Ashraf reportedly confronted Adm. Masurul Haq, and later joined the scheme when he accepted the subsequent financial amount that was transferred to Ashraf's account by Adm. Mansurul Haq in 1995. It was not until 1996 when new director, Rear-Admiral Tanvir Ahmed, began looking into this matter and dug out the cover-up intelligence information in this matter, eventually launching his own investigation with new and most reliable leads that he had discovered when he looked into this matter.

In 1997, the scandal was eventually exposed in the news media by director of naval intelligence, Rear-Admiral Tanvir Ahmed when he authorized a second sting operation that the arrests of several high ranking admirals in the Navy, and Cdre. Ashraf who had departed to the United Kingdom to attend the war course at the Royal College of Defence Studies in Great Britain, was eventually recalled to face the court-martial.

== Aftermath and Investigations ==
=== Pakistan: Relief of Mansurul Haq and massive cover-ups ===
In 1997, Prime Minister Nawaz Sharif signed the relief papers that dismissed the commission of Admiral Mansurul Haq, and was arrested for a brief time by the Naval Police but was released when Naval Intelligence investigations led by R-Adm. Ahmad failed to produce any evidence against him in 1998.

In 1999, the National Accountability Bureau (NAB) under Cdre. Muhammad Zakaullah, announced to take over of inquiries and requested the extradition of Adm. Mansurul Haq from the United States in 2001 in light of new evidences surfaced. Mansurul Haq later faced the accountability and transferred more than $9.5 million, though a plea bargain deal that ensure his release, into the Navy's account in 2003–04—an amount that was said to be enough to pay the salaries of entire Navy for two years. In 1999–2005, there were several indictments and convictions held against civilian contractors and politicians by the courts in Pakistan in light of the inquiries conducted by the NAB and the FIA who were able to recover the large sum of amount into national treasury through the plea bargains.

Inquiries and findings that involved several high ranking admirals were subjected to a massive cover up by the Musharraf administration when the release of Cdre. Ashraf and Capt. Liaquat Ali Malik was authorized under the unknown circumstances in 2002–03. Major allegations were also directed towards the senior ranking army generals who played a crucial role in covering-up other defence deals with France and Ukraine when Agosta commission case was exposed in 2000–03 to prevent tarnishing the further image of the military in the public.

In France, the NAB and the FIA investigations also implicated the civilian defence contractor, Amir Lodhi (brother Dr. Maliha Lodhi), whose share was €2.9 million, Aftab Shaban Mirani, the Defence Minister in Benazir's administration, Zafar Iqbal, a civilian defence contractor, Hazar Bijarani, Defence Production minister in Benazir administration, and A.A. Zardari, Investment minister in Benazir's administration. According to the FIA and NAB, Amir Lodhi was a close associate and business partner of Asif Ali Zardari and Benazir Bhutto. In 2010, Cdre. Ashraf leveled serious allegations on Sharif family of being benefactory of the scheme, though he failed to provide subsequent evidences.

The NAB and the FIA reportedly recovered more than ~$30 million from the benefitted parties though it was reported that ~$28 million were still untraceable and unaccounted for.

=== France: Court investigations and indictments ===
When the scandal became public in 1997 by the Naval Intelligence, the French court opened the inquiry into this matter as French prosecutors were able to retrieve evidences from their Pakistani counterparts. The French media widely reported that Ziad Takieddine, a Lebanese French civilian contractor, received millions of Euros as part of his commission, and then paid off lobbying firms in Pakistan and France in their respective currencies. The French courts eventually opened the inquiries and founded that the large part of the commission was used to finance the presidential campaign of Edouard Balladur in 1995.

The French court investigation also founded the connection of Paul Manafort, an American adviser to French presidential candidate Edouard Balladur, into this weapons trade with Pakistan. On April 26, 1995, it was reported that €8.8 million were donated to the presidential campaign of former French Prime Minister Edouard Balladur from the account of Crédit du Nord, only three days after the first round of presidential elections. Based on the court's insights, the French Police detailed Renaud Donnedieu de Vabres, the former French culture minister in Balludur's government, for questioning about the kickbacks on Agosta 90Brave submarines deal which may have funded the Edouard Balladur's failed 1995 presidential campaign.

On 3 July 2012, French police raided Nicolas Sarkozy's private residence and campaign office as part of their probe into claims that he was involved in illegal political campaign financing. The French prosecutors leveled allegations on French politicians of their involvement in selling the Agosta submarine commissions that was used in political campaigns. Nicolas Sarkozy who was the Finance minister in Balladur's government in 1995, had denied any involvement in the scandal.

== Legacy and later events ==
=== Bus bombing in Karachi and lawsuits ===
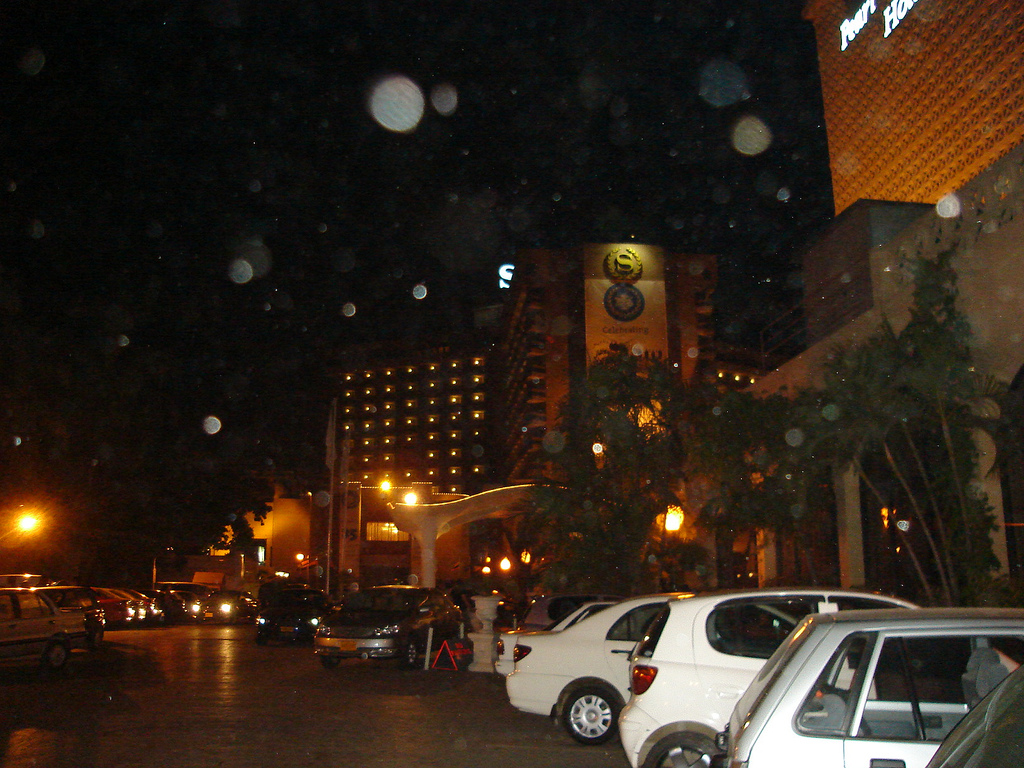
The Sheraton Hotel in Karachi in 2007. The blast severely damaged the 15-story high hotel in 2002.

In the morning of 8 May 2002, a man driving an explosive-laden Honda Civic parallel to the Daewoo city bus outside the Sheraton Hotel in Karachi, detonated his car with the moving bus, ripping the bus apart and severely damaging the hotel. In this attack, it was reported that eleven of the French navy's engineers and two Pakistani engineers were killed while 40 others were injured in this attack. The French engineers were working with their Pakistani counterparts to assemble the machined parts of the Agosta 90Bravo submarines in Naval Dockyard in Karachi Initial blames were put on the Indian branch of al-Qaeda, and later Pakistani crime-scene investigators linked it with HuM operatives who later confessed that the attacks were supposed to target the Americans but mistakenly attacked the French nationals.

The European media later placed the blame on the Pakistani military who orchestrated this attack in retaliation for the cancellation of these commissions— this theory was rejected by the Pakistan MoI after Interior Minister Moinuddin Haider held a televised press conference to release the details of mastermind, Sharib Zubair, arrested on 18 September 2002.

The families of eleven killed French engineers filed multiple lawsuits in Sindh High Court with their lawyers arguing for financial compensation from the governments of both nations while seeking the death penalties for those accused, and the two HuM operatives were sentenced to death for the bombing in 2003. The suspected bomb-maker, Mufti Mohammad Sabir, was arrested in Karachi on 8 September 2005 and hanged in 2014. In series of lawsuits filed by the families of French engineers, there were several convictions on many suspected HuM operatives who were either hanged or facing solitary confinement in successive years, though the courts had acquitted three defendants by 2009 due to lack of evidences.

According to French Libération, the links between the attack and the activities of the DCNS were raised by it, and by American investigators in 2002 who joined the investigation. The DCNS recruited Claude Thévenet, an official from the DST, who worked with Tariq Pervez, a lead investigator in the FIA's investigation into corruption in this scandal and events leading towards targeting the French nationals, to investigate the circumstances of the attack. Thévenet report, titled: "Nautilus", dated 11 September 2002, concluded that it was related to the discontinuation of payment of commissions. This report, although intended as confidential, was seized by the judges in the spring of 2008, in connection with another case, and forwarded to Judge Marc Trévidic.

The Pakistani investigators contested the French findings and cited their theory that the attack was indeed carried out by HuM and al-Qaeda, mistaking the French nationals for the Americans.

In 2013, Mansurul Haq filed a lawsuit against the Government of Pakistan, seeking to restore his military rank and medical pensions, at the Sindh High Court. The Sindh High Court agreed upon restoring the rank (as former) but not the medical pensions that are enjoyed by the retired four-star officers in the Pakistani military– Haq later died from chronic heart disease in 2018.

=== Further criticism in 2010–13 ===
In 2002–03, the Navy, NAB, FIA and the Musharraf administration had to sustained strong criticism over the handling of the scandal by the former spies and investigators who served in the Naval Intelligence. Within the Navy, the officers from the Surface Command, along with Aviation Command (NAVCOM) blamed the officers in the Submarine Command (COMSUBS) of receiving the commissions and kickbacks. In 2010, the Investigative journalism in this matter was launched by journalists from Dawn News and Geo News after Asif Ali Zardari assume the presidency in 2008.

According to V-Adm. Javed Iqbal in 2013, it was Adm. S.M. Khan, the Navy chief in 1994, who "was the real person to take away the big chunk because the deal was implemented in his tenure." Navy investigator, R-Adm. Tanvir Ahmed, also backed and echoed Adm. Iqbal's allegation and scrutinized Adm. S.M. Khan of receiving the commissions and kickbacks while giving criticism to Navy's naval crime investigation branch for singling out Mansurul Haq.

The Navy's investigators, V-Adm. Javed Iqbal and R-Adm. Ahmad, reportedly testified in media that the "top brass of the Navy's leadership at that time had come from the Submarine Command (SUBCOM), including Vice-Admiral A. U. Khan, Adm. Abdul Aziz Mirza, and Adm. Fasih Bokhari, which according to investigators, were central in covering-up the scandal by quietly closing the investigations. Major allegations also directed towards the Pakistan Army's generals who worked towards with their naval counterparts to cover-up the investigations to prevent maligning the image of the Navy and the military as whole.

In 2011, the News International editorial gave criticism to Fasih Bokhari of quietly closed the case against retired Mansurul Haq when the latter was not found guilty but did not take actions against those naval officers who had received kickbacks including Aftab Shaban Mirani who the Defence Minister involved in the affairs."

== See also ==
- Corruption charges against Benazir Bhutto and Asif Ali Zardari
- National Accountability Bureau
- Agosta-class submarine § Variants
