= VIP culture in Pakistan =

Socioeconomic phenomenon

VIP culture in Pakistan refers to the widespread phenomenon of preferential treatment and privileges extended to individuals considered as Very Important Persons (VIPs). This culture permeates various sectors, including public services, law enforcement, and political institutions. It has been a subject of criticism for perpetuating elitism, inequality, and systemic corruption.

== Background ==
The roots of VIP culture in Pakistan can be traced back to the colonial era, where a hierarchical system was established, favoring the elite. Post-independence, this system persisted, with political leaders, bureaucrats, and military officials often receiving special privileges.

The legacy of feudalism and centralized power structures has perpetuated a hierarchy where state resources are treated as private entitlements for the elite.

== Manifestations of VIP culture ==
=== Traffic disruptions ===
VIP movements frequently lead to road blockades, causing significant inconvenience to the public. For instance, in December 2015, a 10-month-old girl died in Karachi after her father was denied entry to a hospital due to security protocols for a political leader's visit.

=== Preferential treatment in public services ===
In public hospitals, VIP patients often receive immediate attention, while ordinary citizens face long waits. A protest by young doctors in Lahore in 2017 highlighted this issue, demanding an end to the preferential treatment of VIPs in government hospitals.

=== Governance and politics ===
Politicians and high-ranking officials frequently benefit from state resources, security details, and other privileges unrelated to their official duties. These perks are often justified under the guise of protocol or national importance, despite being misused for personal convenience.

=== Security protocols ===
High-profile individuals are accompanied by armed security personnel, often traveling in luxury vehicles. The trend of using SUVs such as Toyota Land Cruiser Prado and Vigo Champ for VIP security has grown due to increasing security concerns.

=== Airport protocols ===
VIPs often bypass standard procedures at airports, receiving expedited services. In 2018, the Pakistani government announced a ban on VIP protocols at airports to curb this practice.

== Public criticism and protests ==
Public frustration over VIP culture has led to numerous protests. In October 2014, citizens in Karachi protested against the disruptive effects of VIP movements on daily life.

The excessive focus on providing VIP protection sometimes diverts critical resources from broader security needs, potentially endangering public safety.

== Government measures and reforms ==
Various administrations have pledged to dismantle VIP culture. In 2015, the Khyber Pakhtunkhwa government announced that no VIP would be allowed to disrupt traffic flow. Similarly, in 2024, the Khyber Pakhtunkhwa government banned free accommodation for VIPs in government rest houses, aiming to ensure equitable access for all citizens.

== See also ==
- Corruption in Pakistan
