= National Hydrographic Office (Pakistan) =

Pakistan Navy's staff corps for hydrography

- Founded: 1955; 71 years ago
- Country: Pakistan
- Branch: Pakistan Navy
- Type: Combat service support
- Role: Administrative and staffing oversight.
- HQ/Garrison: Navy HQ in Islamabad
- Nickname: NHO
- Colors: Blue and White
- Anniversaries: Navy Day: 6 September
- Engagements: List of tropical cyclones in Pakistan
- Website: national hydrographic office

Commanders
- Hydrographer of Pakistan (HOP): V-Adm Faisal Abbasi

The National Hydrographic Office (NHO), formerly known as Pakistan Navy Hydrographic Department, is a military administrative and an engineering staff branch of the Pakistan Navy. The National Hydrographic Office is generally associated with conducting hydrographic surveys, oceanography, maritime works, and cartography but it performs various oceanographic works in the country as part of its nation-building mission.

The National Hydrographic Office is commanded by the Hydrographer-of-Pakistan who serves as the naval chiefs's hydrographer, and advises the Navy HQ on matters of marine engineering and physical oceanographic meteorology.

The current Hydrographer-of-Pakistan is Vice-Admiral Faisal Abbasi.

== History ==
In 1949, Rear-Admiral James Wilfred Jefford laid the foundation of the hydrographic arm within the Pakistan Navy with Captain Colin Goyder Little— a Commander in the Royal Australian Navy at that time— was its first commanding officer as hydrographer of Pakistan. In 1955, it was finally commissioned in the Pakistan Navy as its hydrographic arm— the British Royal Navy officers played crucial role in helping the Navy run its operations with Commander John C. Gratton, later Commander Robert Hunt who the last British Royal Officer in the Pakistan Navy in 1955.

Originally, it was known as Pakistan Navy Hydrographic Department but later re-organized and re-designated itself as National Hydrographic Office (NHO). The Office is mandated to conduct scientific inquiries on hydrographic surveys of maritime borders of Pakistan by publishing the military nautical maps and datasets.

The National Hydrographic Officer is commanded by the Hydrographer of Pakistan (HOP), usually active-duty two-star rank, Rear-Admiral, who serves as the chief hydrographer and principal oceanographer in advising the Navy HQ and the Government of Pakistan on important matters on oceanography, navigation, cartography, surveys, and hydrography.

=== Hydrographic works ===
In 1995, the National Hydrographic Office Pakistan (NHO) played an important and crucial role in conducting scientific inquiries that helped the Government of Pakistan to extends its exclusive economic zone (EEZ). The project was commissioned by Ministry of Science and Technology which delegated the project to National Institute of Oceanography (NIO) as a civilian department along with the National Hydrographic Office Pakistan as a military department in 2005.

In 2009, Government of Pakistan submitted its claim United Nations Convention on the Law of the Sea, which approved the extension of the shelf from 200 nautical miles (370 km; 230 mi) to 350 nautical miles (650 km; 400 mi). With this approval, Pakistan became the first country in the Indian Ocean to have successfully achieved extension in outer limits of continental shelf.

In past, the office also helped resolved Pakistan's territorial claims with Myanmar, Iran, and Oman, as well as providing support to Government of Pakistan resolve the Sir Creek issue with India.
