= Fasih Bokhari =

Pakistani military officer (1942–2020)

Admiral Fasih Bokhari NI(M) HI(M) SI(M) SBt PGAT
- فصیح بخارى

Chairman of the National Accountability Bureau
- In office 17 October 2011 – 29 May 2013
- Preceded by: Deedar Hussain Shah
- Succeeded by: Qamar Zaman Chaudhry

Chief of Naval Staff
- In office 2 May 1997 – 2 October 1999
- Preceded by: Adm. Mansurul Haq
- Succeeded by: Adm. Abdul Aziz Mirza

Personal details
- Born: 8 March 1942 British India
- Died: 24 November 2020 (aged 78) Islamabad, Pakistan

Military service
- Allegiance: Pakistan
- Branch/service: Pakistan Navy
- Years of service: 1959–1999
- Rank: Admiral (S/No. PN-858)
- Unit: Submarine Command
- Commands: Vice Chief of the Naval Staff; Commander – Pakistan Fleet; DCNS (Operations); ACNS (Personnel)
- Battles/wars: Indo-Pakistani War of 1965; Indo-Pakistani War of 1971; Naval operations; Kargil War; Atlantique Incident
- Awards: Nishan-e-Imtiaz (Military); Hilal-e-Imtiaz (Military); Sitara-e-Imtiaz (Military); Sitara-e-Basalat; Naval Forces Medal; Order of Military Merit; Order of Military Service

Fasih Bokhari NI(M) HI(M) SI(M) SBt PGAT (Urdu: فصیح بخارى; 8 March 1942 – 24 November 2020) was a Pakistani admiral who served as the Chief of Naval Staff from 1997 to 1999. He was a well-known pacifist and a prominent political figure as the Chief of Naval Staff from 1997 until his voluntary resignation in 1999, which stemmed from his staunch opposition to the then-Pakistani President Pervez Musharraf's instigation of the Kargil War with India, a conflict that Bokhari reportedly saw as an act of inappropriate and uncoordinated aggression from Pakistan and one that subsequently led him into a bitter dispute with Musharraf. Bokhari also served as the chairman of the National Accountability Bureau, a Pakistani anti-corruption agency.

In 1999, Bokhari publicly disagreed and revolted against the decision of then-Prime Minister Nawaz Sharif to extend Pervez Musharraf's tenure as the Chairman of the Joint Chiefs of Staff Committee preceding the latter's supersession as the Chief of Army Staff. He is notable for his war opposition stance, having called for public introspections about Musharraf's decisions related to the 1999 Kargil War in 2000.

In 2011, Bokhari was appointed the chairman of the National Accountability Bureau by President Asif Ali Zardari. However, his appointment was mired in public controversies, leading to his eventual removal by the Supreme Court of Pakistan in 2013.

== Biography ==
=== Naval career and between wars (1965–1971) ===
Fasih Bokhari was born in 1942 in British Indian Empire, now India and Pakistan. In 1959, he was commissioned in the Pakistan Navy as a Midshipman and was sent to the Britannia Royal Naval College in United Kingdom to complete his training. His S/No. was PN No. 858 when he joined the Navy in 1959.

Upon returning to Pakistan in 1962, he was promoted to Sub-Lieutenant and inducted into the Submarine Command as a navigation officer. He served in the Ghazi and did short training on submarine operations at the Naval Academy in Turkey.

S/Lt. Bokhari joined Ghazi as a torpedo specialist under then-Cdr. K.R. Niazi and participated in war operations in the second war with India in 1965. In 1969, he was promoted to Lieutenant and moved to join the Hangor under the command of Cdr. Ahmed Tasnim. He earned notability for his valor of actions in the third war with India in 1971 when he served as a torpedo officer in the Hangor. Lt. Bokhari, together with then-Lt.Cdr A.U. Khan correctly identified the INS Khukri, and provided coordinates that ultimately sank the Khukri in 1971. After the war, he was honored with Sitara-e-Jurat together with Commander Tasnim.

During the war, Lt. Bokhari was pulled off the Submarine Command after Hangor reported back to its base and was sent to join the elite Special Services Group Navy (SSGN) after completing the quick training on special operations. He led a Platoon that consisted of 80 men and was stationed in Karachi to defend the coastal areas from the advancing Indian Army. After learning of the surrender and the secession of east-Pakistan as Bangladesh, Lt. Bokhari became disillusioned with his war career and immediately submitted his resignation in the face of what he considered bleak prospects in the Navy for his future. However, his resignation was not accepted by his superior commanding officers who successfully persuaded him to continue serving in the Navy.

In 1973, Lt. Bokhari was sent to France where he attended the École Militaire (a French naval war college) and graduated with a staff course degree in 1975. Upon returning to Pakistan, he was promoted as Lieutenant-Commander and commanded the PNS Mangro as his commanding assignment. In 1978, he was promoted to Commander and briefly completed a war assignment at the Ministry of Defence (MoD). In 1983–84, Commander Bokhari attended the National Defence University and briefly studied at the Armed Forces War College. He studied under then-Colonel Jehangir Karamat who had profound influence on his critical thinking and authored his thesis on the war studies, required for his master's degree which he attained in 1984.

=== Command and staff appointments ===
From 1985 to 1991, Captain Bokhari was posted at the Navy NHQ and served as the Director of Naval Operations (DNO) and director of the naval warfare operation plans. In addition, Captain Bokhari also commanded a Daphné submarine and two destroyers as part of his command experience in the Navy.

In 1991, he was promoted to one-star rank, Commodore, and briefly tenured as ACNS (Personnel) until 1992 when he was promoted to Rear-Admiral.

At the NHQ, Rear-Admiral Bokhari was appointed DCNS (Supply) until 1995 when he was promoted to the three-star assignment. From 1995 to 1997, Vice-Admiral Bokhari commanded the Pakistan Fleet as its commander when he took over the command from out-going Vice Admiral Shamoon Alam Khan.

In 1995, Vice-Admiral Bokhari was elevated as the Vice Chief of the Naval Staff (VCNS) under Admiral Mansurul Haq.

Vice-Admiral Bokhari became involved in the acquisitions and indigenous production of Agosta 90B submarines, with the French assistance. He died on 24 November 2020.

== Chief of Naval Staff ==
On 1 January 1997, Vice-Admiral Bokhari was promoted to four-star rank admiral and took over the command of the Navy from the dismissed Admiral Mansurul Haq as Chief of Naval Staff on 5 February 1997. Upon appointment, Admiral Bokhari superseded Vice-Admiral A. U. Khan who was already on extension due to his chairmanship of the National Shipping Corporation, and visited the Joint Staff Headquarters and called on Chairman joint chiefs Gen. Feroze Khan.

As a naval chief, Admiral Bokhari made numerous attempts to reconstruct the Navy and encouraged his subordinates to be more analytical in their thinking. Admiral Bokhari also provided his crucial support for naval base to be established in Balochistan, Pakistan, which was made operationalized on 26 April 1997. In 1999, Admiral Bokhari oversaw the Hammerhead– 99 as part of a series of conceptual exercises conducted annually by the Navy as a prelude to the Sea Spark.

=== 1998 Nuclear tests and General Karamat's relief ===
Admiral Bokhari was the naval chief when India announced that the country conducted the series of nuclear tests under codename Operation Shakti on 12 May 1998. He attended the informal meeting with Chairman Joint Chiefs General Jehangir Karamat and Air Chief Marshal PQ Mehdi, the Chief of Air Staff of Pakistan Air Force, at the residence of General Karamat. Admiral Bokhari reportedly argued against the authorisation of nuclear testings on moral grounds, stressing his arguments on the fact that "Pakistan would be able to claim moral high ground."

Admiral Bokhari made a case for the support of nuclear ambiguity and pointed out that Pakistan still had the nuclear capability and recommended the "wait and watch" policy to see the world's reaction. At the National Security meeting held on 13 May 1998, Admiral Bokhari again stressed his stance on opposing atomic tests and was joined by Finance Minister Sartaj Aziz who argued against the tests in a fear of economic sanctions. At the meeting, Admiral Bokhari again exhorted for practicing the nuclear ambiguity and strongly urging restraint. Nonetheless, the nuclear tests were carried out on 28 May and 30 May in 1998, authorized by the Prime Minister Sharif himself.

On 6 October 1998, Admiral Bokhari invited Chairman joint chiefs General Karamat to deliver the lecture on civil-military relations at the Naval War College where the General Karamat pressed for the idea of reestablishing the official National Security Council that would take on the perennial problem posed to the country, with military having the representation. Prime Minister Sharif viewed this lecture as military's interference on national politics and eventually relieved from the command of the military as the Chairman joint chiefs tendered the signed resignation.

At the public circle, Admiral Fasih Bokhari criticized General Karamat for resigning but Karamat defended his actions as "right thing" to do as he lost the confidence of a constitutionally and popularly elected Prime Minister.

=== Kargil War and Atlantique incident ===
In 1999, General Pervez Musharraf led the Pakistan Army to engage in bitter conflict with Indian Army in disputed Kashmir– an event known as Kargil War. Over the issue of Kargil debacle, Admiral Bokhari attended multiple meetings with the Prime Minister Nawaz Sharif and General Musharraf to be briefed on the Kargil events, and the Indian Army's counterattacks on the Pakistan Army soldiers. After attending the last session on Kargil with the Prime Minister Sharif, Admiral Bokhari did not view the Pakistan Army's engagement with Indian Army as appropriate and lodged a powerful protest against General Musharraf's grand strategy while recommending the constitution of a Commission to completely probe the Kargil issue.

About the Indian Navy maneuvering its fleets to Arabian Sea, Admiral Bokhari reportedly marked that: "Pakistan's already badgered economy could be throttled in a war scenario." Bokhari had the Pakistan Navy's warships begin providing escorts for its existing oil tankers, and secretly deployed submarines to keep track of any attempt by the Indian Navy to block the Karachi coast.

At the country's news media, Admiral Bokhari became well known for his publicly questioning the military strategy behind the Kargil infiltration and gave criticism on General Musharraf's inability for not taking the Navy into the planning stage, while the latter hoped for Navy's intervention to support the nation's defence after the conflict had reached an impasse.

After the Kargil debacle and the martial law in 1999, Admiral Bokhari advised Musharraf to resign from the command of the military and it would be the best for him to leave as soon as possible and seek a solution like former army chief General A.W. Kakar did.

About the Atlantique incident in 1999, Admiral Bokhari reacted angrily on statements issued by the Indian External Affairs ministry and reportedly quoted: "They [Indian] have been trying take the conflict to maritime scale, after the Kargil incident."

=== Revolt and the resignation ===
On 7 October 1998, Lieutenant-General Pervez Musharraf was promoted to four-star army general and took over the command of army from General Karamat as the Chief of Army Staff; in addition, General Musharraf was also made acting Chairman Joint Chiefs on 7 October 1998.

The appointment to the Chairman Joint Chiefs was only meant to be temporary and it was hoped that Admiral Bokhari would be appointed to the post. In September 1999, General Musharraf had sent a message to Prime Minister Sharif that "anyone in the Navy and Air Force can become the Chairman Joint Chiefs as I did not care." General Musharraf reportedly backed Admiral Bokhari's bid for the Chairman Joint Chiefs but he was overseen by the Prime Minister who confirmed and extended General Musharraf's term until 2001.

Upon hearing the news, Admiral Bokhari lodged a strong protest against this decision in the news media and reportedly revolted against Prime Minister Sharif's appointment for the Chairman joint chiefs in 1999. Admiral Bokhari telephoned the Prime Minister Sharif and announced his intention to resign from the command of the Navy despite the Prime Minister urging to complete his tenure. Admiral Bokhari strongly urged his resignation since General Musharraf was his junior and often referred to him as "Sir."

On 5 October 1999, Admiral Bokhari resigned from the command of the Navy as the news media construed Admiral Bokhari's resignation merely as unhappiness over not being appointed Chairman of the Joint Chiefs of Staff Committee.

Admiral Bokhari, however, maintained in 2002 that his resignation came only after realizing that General Musharraf and Prime Minister Sharif had decided to topple each other and he did not want to be part of these "dirty games". Admiral Bokhari's revolt saw the meltdown of the civil-military relations between the elected civilian government and the military leaders that eventually led to the military taking over the civilian government by dismissing Prime Minister Sharif on 12 October 1999.

== Public service ==
=== Chairman National Accountability Bureau ===
In 2007, Bokhari became the President of the Pakistan Ex Servicemen Association which he remained until 2010 before becoming the Convenor of The Save Pakistan Coalition in 2010.

On 17 October 2011, Bokhari was appointed Chairman of the National Accountability Bureau by the then-President Asif Ali Zardari, which the president also confirmed his appointment. His appointment was met with the controversy when then-Opposition leader Nisar Ali Khan raised objection to the nomination on technical grounds but was rejected by the President Zardari. In 2012, he vowed to eliminate the corruption and maintained that the NAB should adapt to eliminate corruption from the country.

Following his appointment, Admiral Bokhari's appointment was challenged by then-Opposition leader Ali Khan after he submitted a complaint at the Supreme Court of Pakistan on technicality. In 2013, Senior Justice T.H. Jillani declared the Bokhari's appointment as "null and void." On 28 May 2013, President Zardari approved the summary that officially terminated Fasih Bokhari's appointment as chairman of NAB.

== Peace activism ==
=== Kargil War Introspection and pacifism ===
After his famous revolt and resignation, Admiral Bokhari began his political activism aimed towards peace between two countries and showed opposition towards wars. In 2002 and again in 2011, Admiral Bokhari pressed for constituting a commission that would introspect the events that led to the Kargil War and showed his willingness to testify before an inquiry commission that would be formed by the government of the day. His support for forming an inquiry commission was supported by then-air chief PQ Mehdi, Lieutenant-General Gulzar Kiyani (DGMI), Lieutenant-General Tauqeer Zia (DGMO), Lieutenant-General Shahid Aziz (DG ISI Analysis Wing), and Lieutenant-General Abdul Majeed Malik.

After the Kargil War and coup d'état in 1999, followed by the military standoff between two nations, Admiral Bokhari became politically active in supporting peace and expressing opposition to war by pressing towards the idea of resolving any possible sources of future conflict at sea.

The Indian Navy's former Chief of the Naval Staff Admiral J.G. Nadkarni recently opined that Pakistan had sensible mariners in decision-making positions who were keen to have agreements with the Indian Navy. Admiral Fasih Bokhari, Pakistan's naval chief from 1997 to 1999, was a great proponent of maritime co-operation with India and believed that it would benefit both countries."

From 2010–2011, Admiral Bokhari wrote column based on defence and strategic strategies for the English-language newspaper, Express Tribune, where he focused on peaceful coexistence with India and balanced relations with the United States and Afghanistan.

=== Views on 1999 Coup d'état ===
In 2002, Admiral Bokhari quoted that: he knew about General Musharraf’s plans to topple [Prime Minister] Nawaz Sharif and did not want to be part of these "Dirty Games". Admiral Bokhari also noted that a power struggle between an elected Prime Minister and appointed-Chairman joint chiefs ensued and relations were severely damaged after the Kargil war.

Before enforcing the martial law in 1999 against the elected government, Admiral Bokhari noted: "The two men could not work together, both were preparing to take active actions against each other. I could see that there now two centers of power on a collision course". At an informal meeting held at the Navy NHQ in September 1999, Chairman joint chiefs General Musharraf indicated his displeasure with Prime Minister Nawaz Sharif's handling of the country describing Prime Minister Sharif as "incompetent and incapable of running the country." Admiral Bokhari firmly got the impression whether General Musharraf was sounding out to rely on the support from the Navy in the event of the coup and Admiral Bokhari discouraged the Chairman joint chiefs from doing so.

He contended that the Lahore Declaration process was the best trajectory for Pakistan and should be continued through a political dialogue. He further added that any rupture in the dialogue process would set the country back. Bokhari realised that this meeting was held to secure his support against the elected government.

=== Contribution to "Military Inc." by Ayesha Siddiqa ===
Admiral Bokhari is mentioned multiple times by Ayesha Siddiqa in her book Military Inc., which describes the ideology and actions of the Pakistani military in running their commercial enterprises and business interests. He is quoted directly, as well as cited in multiple other places as an observer of the events and ideology that are described within the military. His significant contribution is acknowledged at the start of the book.

== Criticism ==
In 2012, Brian Coughley, the historian of Pakistan, found it strange that Admiral Bokhari did not inform the government or President Tarar if he had the prior knowledge of intended martial law against the elected government.

In 2011, the News International editorial gave criticism to Bokhari after his appointment as Chairman NAB and opined that "Admiral Bokhari, as CNS, had quietly closed the case against retired Mansurul Haq when the latter was not found guilty but did not take actions against those naval officers who had received kickbacks, including Aftab Shaban Mirani who the Defence Minister involved in the affairs."

== Awards and decorations ==
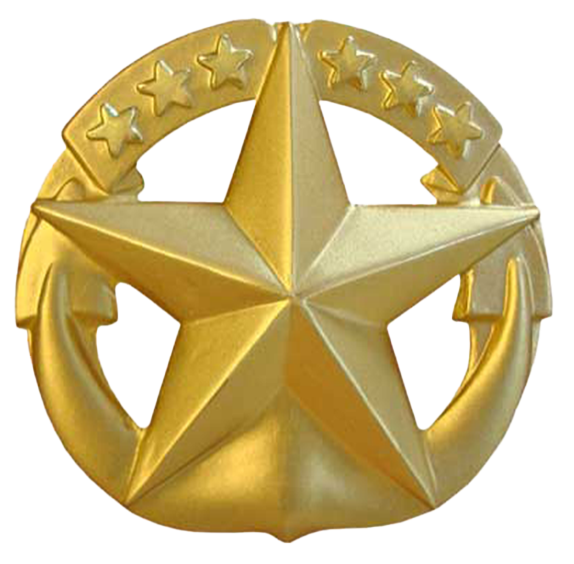

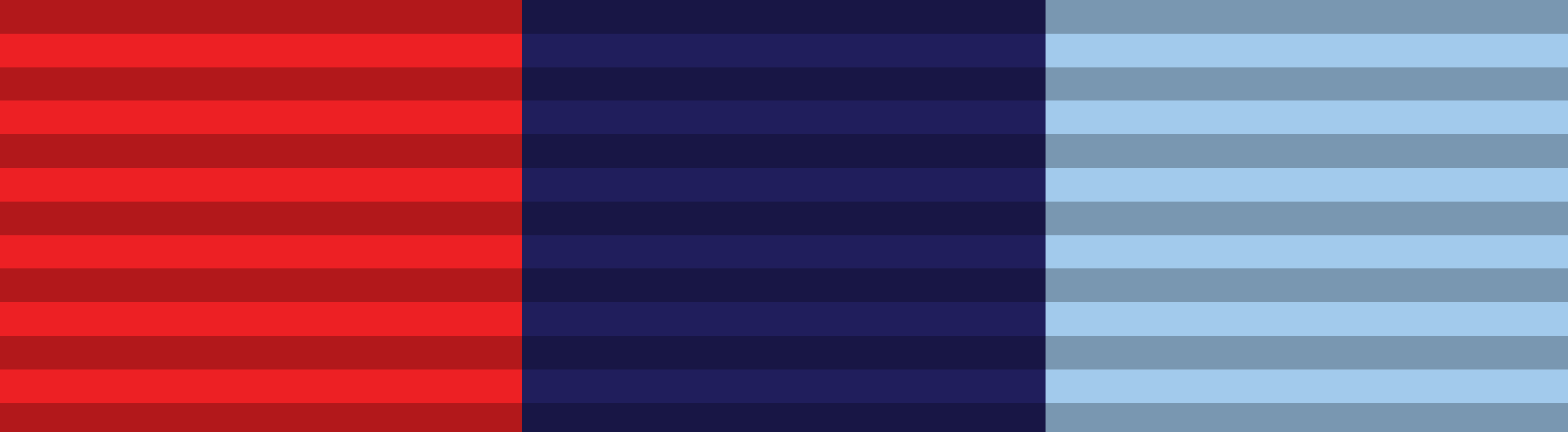

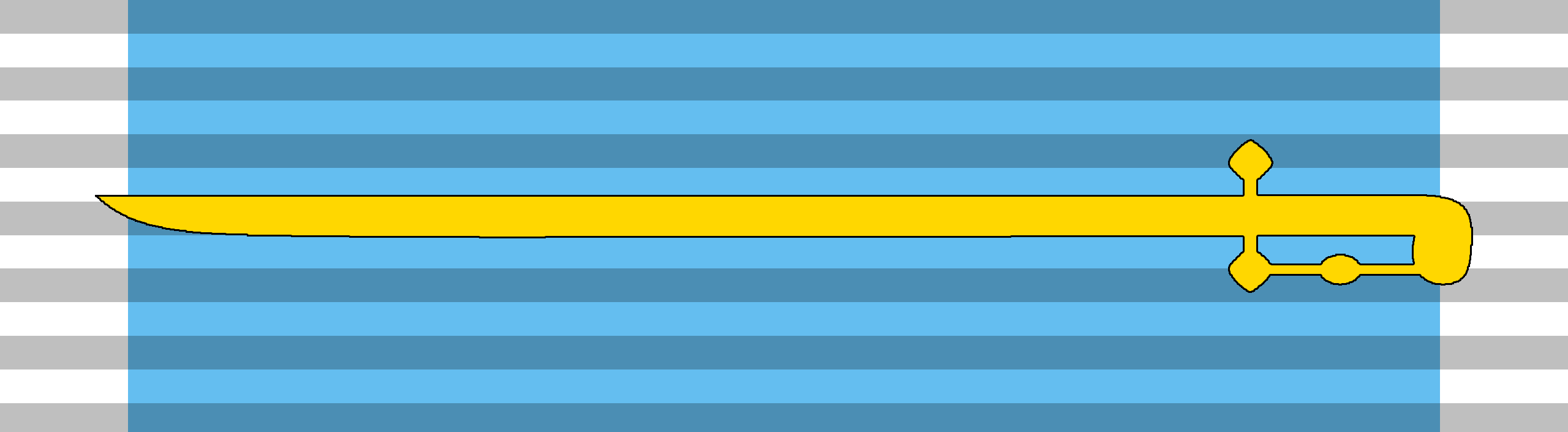

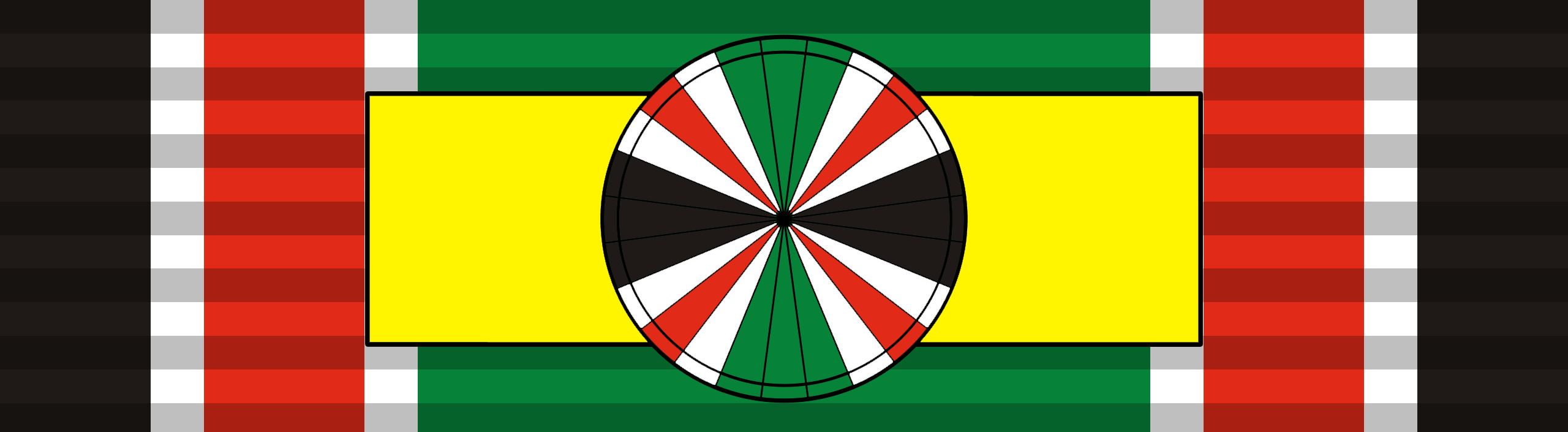

Command at Sea insignia
Nishan-e-Imtiaz (Military) (Order of Excellence)		Hilal-e-Imtiaz (Military) (Crescent of Excellence)	
Sitara-e-Imtiaz (Military) (Star of Excellence)	Sitara-e-Basalat (Star of Good Conduct)	Tamgha-e-Diffa (General Service Medal): 1. 1965 War Clasp; 2. 1971 War Clasp	Sitara-e-Harb 1965 War (War Star 1965)
Sitara-e-Harb 1971 War (War Star 1971)	Tamgha-e-Jang 1965 War (War Medal 1965)	Tamgha-e-Jang 1971 War (War Medal 1971)	Tamgha-e-Baqa (Nuclear Test Medal) 1998
10 Years Service Medal	20 Years Service Medal	30 Years Service Medal	40 Years Service Medal
Tamgha-e-Sad Saala Jashan-e- Wiladat-e-Quaid-e-Azam (100th Birth Anniversary of Muhammad Ali Jinnah) 1976	Hijri Tamgha (Hijri Medal) 1979	Jamhuriat Tamgha (Democracy Medal) 1988	Qarardad-e-Pakistan Tamgha (Resolution Day Golden Jubilee Medal) 1990
Tamgha-e-Salgirah Pakistan (Independence Day Golden Jubilee Medal) 1997	Naval Forces Medal (1st Class) (Saudi Arabia)	Order of Military Merit Grand Cordon (Jordan)	The Order of Military Service (Malaysia)

=== Foreign Decorations ===
Foreign Awards
Saudi Arabia	Naval Forces Medal - (1st Class)
Jordan	The Order of Military Merit - Grand Cordon
Malaysia	The Order of Military Service - Courageous Commander

== See also ==
- Philosophy
  - Morality and ethics
  - Moral values
- Interservice rivalry
  - Army vs. Navy

Military offices
Preceded by Mansurul Haq	Chief of Naval Staff; 1997–1999	Succeeded by Abdul Aziz Mirza
