= Tanvir Ahmed (admiral) =

Pakistan Navy retired rear admiral

Tanveer Ahmed
- Born: Tanvir Ahmed; 1943 (age 82–83); Karachi, Sind, British India (Now, Karachi, Sindh in Pakistan)
- Military career
- Allegiance: Pakistan
- Branch: Pakistan Navy
- Service years: 1963–1999
- Rank: Rear-Admiral
- Unit: Naval Operations Branch
- Commands: DG Naval Intelligence; Ins-Gen. Naval Police; DCNS (Administration); Military attaché at the Pakistan Embassy in Tripoli
- Conflicts: Indo-Pakistani War of 1965; Indo-Pakistani War of 1971

Tanveer Ahmed (Urdu:تنوير احمد), is a retired two-star rank admiral in the Pakistan Navy and an anti-corruption activist, who is notable for leading investigative probes on Agosta submarine scandal and arresting Adm. Mansurul Haq, the former chief of naval staff of the Pakistan Navy from 1994 to 1997.

He is currently serving as an active Rotarian with Rotary Club of Pakistan chapter.

== Biography ==
Tanveer Ahmad was born in 1943 in Karachi, Sind, India, and attended the famed DJ Science College in 1961 where he graduated with diploma in 1963. He was educated with Saleem Mandviwalla who was his classmate.

After graduating, he joined the Pakistan Navy in 1963, where he was educated at the Naval Academy (then known as PNS Rahbar), and did his military training with the Royal Navy in England. He participated well in the second war in 1965 and the Western front of the third war with India in 1971, where he served on the surface branch as surface officer in various surface warships.

From 1977 to 1980, Lieutenant-Commander Ahmed was selected on the diplomatic assignment by the Ministry of Defence (MoD), and dispatched at the Pakistan Embassy in Tripoli in Libya where he briefly served as a military adviser to Libyan Navy.

From 1984 to 1988, Commander Ahmad was commanding officer of PNS Alamgir which he commanded until 1988. He was later educated at the Naval War College. In 1990–93, Cdre Ahmad served in the Karachi Port Trust (KPT) as director of maritime operations as secondment.

In 1994, Cdre Ahmed was appointed as officer commanding of the PNS Haider, a logistics establishment in Karachi, which he served until 1997. In 1997, Rear-Admiral Ahmed was appointed as Director-General of Naval Intelligence (DGNI), taking over the command from Cdre. Shahid Ashraf who briefed him over his secret monitoring of the Agosta Submarines scandal.
