= Naval Intelligence (Pakistan) =

Intelligence agency of the Pakistan Navy

- Active: 1960; 66 years ago
- Country: Pakistan
- Branch: Pakistan Navy
- Type: Combat service support
- Role: Military intelligence
- Size: Varies
- HQ/Garrison: NHQ in Islamabad, Pakistan
- Nickname: NI
- Colors Identification: Blue, White
- Anniversaries: 1948
- Engagements: Military history of Pakistan
- Decorations: Military Decorations of Pakistan military

Commanders
- Director-General: R-Adm. Shahzad Hamid
- Notable commanders: R-Adm. Javed Iqbal; R-Adm. Tanvir Ahmed

Insignia
- War Flag

The Naval Intelligence, commonly known as the NI, is the intelligence agency of the Pakistan Navy.

The NI provides assessments on capabilities of real-time reporting of the foreign navies while tasked with protecting the maritime resources, interests, countering and managing maritime threats.

Not much has been publicized about the missions and works of the NI as the Pakistani military rarely released official details of the NI's activities.
