= Naval Headquarters (Pakistan) =

Direct reporting post of Pakistan Navy

Naval Headquarters
- Part of Joint Staff Headquarters
- Islamabad, Pakistan

Site information
- Type: HQ
- Owner: Ministry of Defense (MoD)
- Operator: Secretariat-III Navy
- Controlled by: Chief of the Naval Staff
- Open to the public: No

Location
- Coordinates: 33°43′26.24″N 73°0′27.63″E

Site history
- Built: 1975; 51 years ago
- Built for: National Navy HQ of Pakistan Armed Forces
- Built by: Corps of Engineers (Construction and expansion since 1975)

Garrison information
- Current commander: CNS Admiral Naveed Ashraf
- Designations: Navy HQ

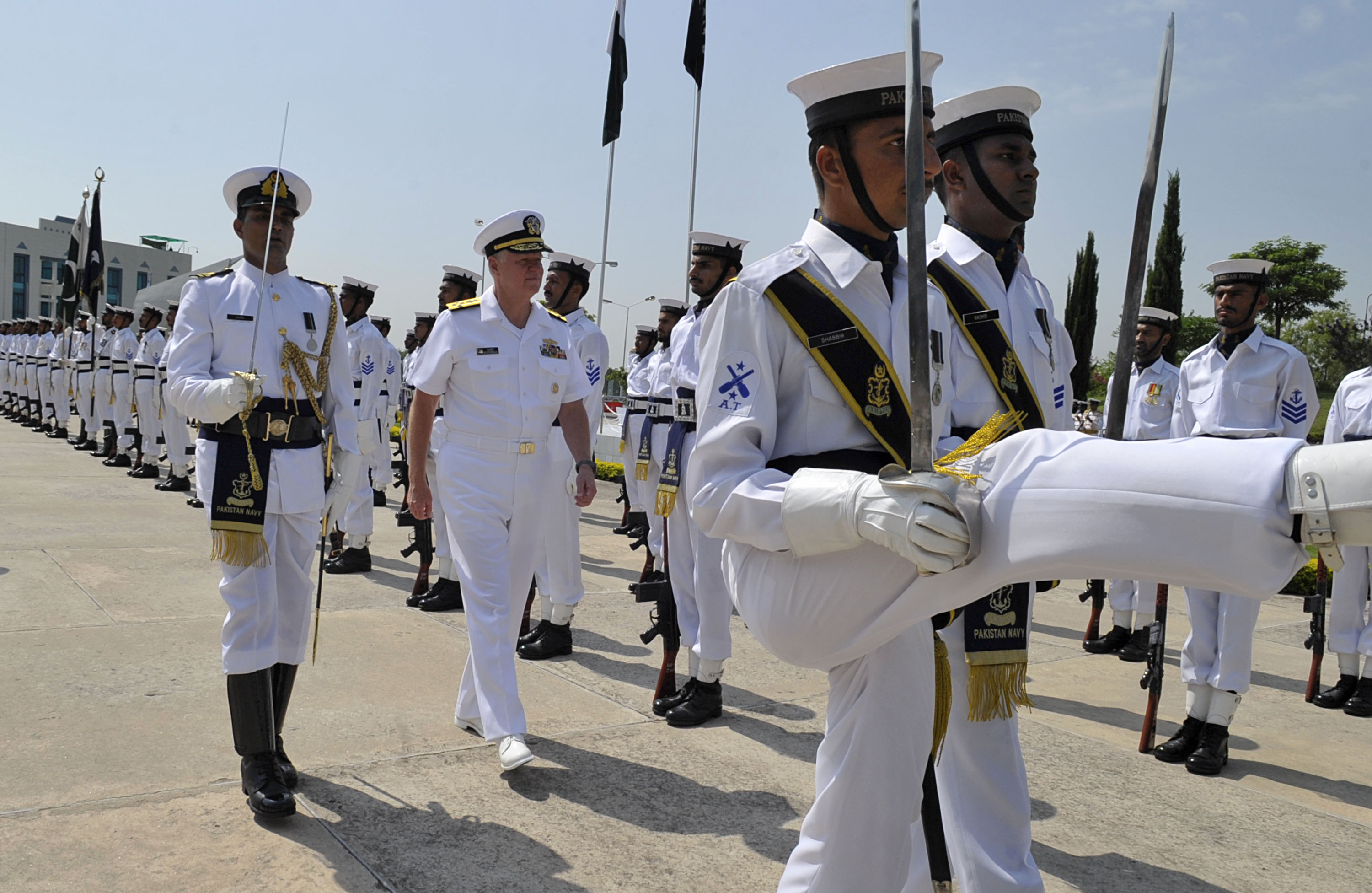
Adm. Gary Roughead, then-U.S. Chief of Naval Operations, at the pavilion of the Navy HQ in 2009.

The Naval Headquarters, also known as the Navy NHQ, is the direct reporting and the command post of the Pakistan Navy, currently stationed in Islamabad, Pakistan.

== History ==
In 1859, the British Royal Navy in India established its first command post in Manora Fort when Captain Thomas Maitland from HMS Wellesley succeeded in capturing most of the southern region of British India, which now is modern-day Pakistan. In 1864, the Gen. Charles James Napier had built city's one of first Church and the first Lighthouse in 1888.

On 14 August 1947, Vice Admiral James Wilfred decided to move the command post from Monora Island to Mules Mansion in Karachi– nation's first capital. Based in Mules Mansion in Karachi, the Navy's NHQ faced many problems relating to strategic communication with the Air Force HQ (in Peshawar at that time) and the Army GHQ (then in Rawalpindi), operational planning, and execution that resulted in military's overall performance failure in 1971.

Recommendations accepted from the report of the War Enquiry Commission, the Navy's NHQ was shifted Islamabad to provide coordination with the Army's GHQ on 15 March 1975. Initially, Navy's NHQ was housed in a government secretariat building Islamabad but later built its own headquarter buildings in Islamabad.

== Secretariat ==
The Pakistan Navy's NHQ is a command post of the Pakistan Navy where the secretariat of the Chief of the Naval Staff functions to ensure the ceremonial and operational command of the navy.

There are three chief of staff branches that composed of multiple offices to oversee the administrative operations of the navy. In fact, the Navy's NHQ functions exactly on similar protocol of Army GHQ. Each of the navy's branches and the deputy chiefs of naval staff of the administrative branches works under the Vice Chief of the Naval Staff (CGS). The vice chief of naval staff, who usually heads the Navy's NHQ Staff, reports directly to chief of naval staff on daily routine basis.

=== Branches of the Pakistan Navy ===
There are three high staff level branches of the Pakistan Navy that are headed by the vice-admirals and multiple administrative branches that are commanded by the deputy chiefs of naval staff who are ranked at the rear-admirals.

The Chief of Navy Staff Secretariat is not considered as a part of the navy branch but functions separately as an office of the chief of navy staff.

- Staff Headquarters at the Navy's NHQ
  - Chief of Naval Staff Secretariat (CNS Secy.)
    - Military Secretary
  - Operations Branch (OC: COS Ops. Brnch.)
    - DCNS of Military Operations
    - DCNS of Projects
    - Dte. of Naval Intelligence
    - Dte. of Public Relations
    - Dte. of C4I
  - Logistics Branch (OC: COS Log. Brnch.)
    - DCNS of Materials
    - DCNS of Supply
  - Personnel Branch (OC: COS Per. Brnch.)
    - DCNS of Welfare and Housing
    - DCNS of Training and Personnel
    - DCNS of Administration
    - Dte. of Naval Secretariat

Source:"Pakistan Navy Organizations (official website)". www.paknavy.gov.pk.

== See also ==
- Joint Staff Headquarters (Pakistan)
- Air Headquarters (Pakistan Air Force)
- General Headquarters (Pakistan Army)
