= PNS Hangor (2024) =

Pakistani submarine

- The Type 039B submarine, the baseline design of the Hangor-class submarine.

History

Pakistan
- Name: PNS Hangor
- Namesake: PNS Hangor
- Operator: Pakistan Navy
- Ordered: 2015
- Builder: China Shipbuilding Industry Corporation
- Launched: April 2024
- Acquired: 30 April 2026
- Commissioned: 30 April 2026
- Home port: Jinnah Naval base
- Status: In active service

General characteristics
- Type: Attack submarine
- Displacement: 2,800 t (2,800 long tons)
- Length: 76 m (249 ft 4 in)
- Beam: 8.4 m (27 ft 7 in) (Estimated)
- Draught: 6.2 m (20 ft 4 in)
- Propulsion: 4 x CSOC CHD620 diesel engines; Stirling-powered air-independent propulsion
- Speed: 20 knots (37 km/h; 23 mph)
- Range: ~2,000 nmi (3,700 km; 2,300 mi)
- Crew: ~36
- Notes: Pakistan-specific variant of Type 039A submarine

PNS Hangor is the lead boat of the Hangor-class submarines of the Pakistan Navy. She was commissioned in April 2026.

== History ==
In April 2015, during a briefing to the National Assembly Standing Committee on Defence, Pakistan Navy (PN) representatives disclosed that the Pakistani government, then headed by prime minister Nawaz Sharif, had approved the purchase of eight attack submarines from China, at an estimated cost of US$4–5 billion. In October of the same year, Pakistan's Minister of Defence Production Rana Tanveer Hussain announced that the deal for the eight submarines had been finalised, disclosing that four each of the vessels would be built in China and Pakistan, respectively.

In January 2017, Admiral Muhammad Zakaullah, the-then PN Chief of Naval Staff, announced that the eight future submarines would be eponymously christened as the Hangor class, after PNS Hangor (S131), a Daphné-class submarine which the PN had used to sink INS Khukri, a Blackwood-class frigate of the Indian Navy, during the Indo-Pakistani Naval War of 1971.

On 26 April 2024 the PN announced that the submarine had been launched. On 30 April 2026, PNS Hangor was officially commissioned by the Pakistan Navy with a ceremony in Sanya, China. Asif Ali Zardari, the President of Pakistan, and Pakistan's Chief of Naval Staff, Admiral Naveed Ashraf, attended the ceremony. Publications from the United States Naval Institute indicate that Jinnah Naval Base is likely to be the vessel's homeport.

On 27 September 2026, the submarine test fired a long-range cruise missile in the Arabian sea.

== Capabilities ==
The submarine is outfitted with an air-independent propulsion system featuring a Stirling engine, along with four CHD620 diesel engines. This will allow the submarine to stay submerged for long periods of time and offset the Indian Navy's larger fleet. The submarine is equipped with Yu-7 torpedoes and anti-ship missiles. It has also been proposed to fit the submarine with the nuclear-capable Babur-3 Pakistani-manufactured cruise missile.

== See also ==
- INS Kalvari
