= Ahmad Tasnim =

Pakistan Navy vice admiral

Chairman of Karachi Port Trust
- In office 1992–1994
- Preceded by: RAdm S. R. Hussain
- Succeeded by: RAdm AKbar H. Khan

Chairman of National Shipping Corporation
- In office 11 November 1991 – 21 April 1992
- Preceded by: RAdm S. Hamid Khalid
- Succeeded by: VAdm Mansurul Haq

Personal details
- Born: Ahmad Tasnim; 1935 (age 90–91) Jullundar, Punjab, British India (Present-day Jalandhar, Punjab, India)
- Citizenship: (British Raj) British India (1935–47); Pakistan (1947 – present)
- Education: Britannia Royal Naval College; Royal Naval College, Greenwich; National Defence University

Military service
- Allegiance: Pakistan
- Branch/service: Pakistan Navy
- Years of service: 1954–1994
- Rank: Vice Admiral
- Unit: Submarine Service Branch (PN No. 609)
- Commands: Commander Pakistan Fleet; DCNS (Personnel); 25th Destroyer Squadron; Military attaché, Pakistan Embassy, Paris; Submarine Command (COMSUBS)
- Battles/wars: Indo-Pakistani War of 1965; Operation Dwarka; Indo-Pakistani War of 1971; Sinking of INS Khukri
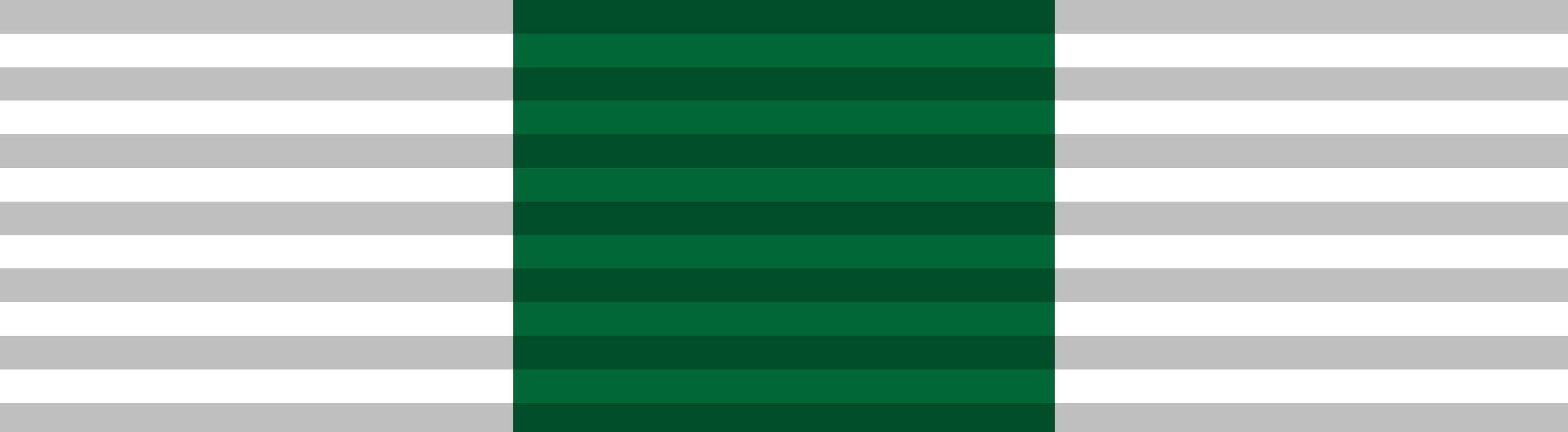
- Awards: Hilal-e-Imtiaz (Military) Sitara-e-Jurat & Bar Sitara-i-Imtiaz (Military) Sitara-e-Basalat

Ahmad Tasnim HI(M) SJ & Bar (Note: "Bar" refers to a second award of the same honour) SI(M) SBt (Urdu: احمد تسنيم; born 1935) is a retired three-star rank admiral of the Pakistan Navy who is known for his command of Hangor, a submarine that sank INS Khukri on 8 December 1971 during Indo-Pakistani war of 1971, off the coast of Diu, India.

The sinking of INS Khukri was the first submarine kill since World War II, and the only one until a Royal Navy Conqueror sank an Argentinian cruiser (General Belgrano) during the Falklands War of the 1980s. In the 1990s, he was appointed chairman of the Karachi Port Trust and the Pakistan National Shipping Corporation while serving in the Navy until he retired in 1994.

== Biography ==
=== Early life and career in the Navy ===
Tasnim was born to a Punjabi Muslim Arain family in the village of Mianwal, Jullunder, Punjab in British India, in 1935. In an interview, he stated that his ancestors "most likely came from Iran" and "took up agriculture as their livelihood" after settling in the "area".

His father, Mohammad Yakob, was a civil servant for the British Raj government. In 1940, he moved with his father who was posted to Jhang in West Punjab and permanently moved to Burewala after the independence of Pakistan on 14 August as result of the partition of British India. The rest of the family followed shortly thereafter.

After matriculating at Government Islamia High School Jhang, he was admitted at the Government College University in Lahore in 1950 but left his university after being selected for a military service exam in 1952. In 1954, he joined the Pakistan Navy, commissioned as a Midshipman, and was sent to the United Kingdom to attend the Britannia Royal Naval College in Dartmouth, England. He shared his dormitory with army cadet Imran Ullah Khan who would one day become a three-star general. He graduated from the Britannia Royal Naval College in 1955, and was later sent to Australia for further training where he joined the Royal Australian Navy as an exchange officer, getting commissioned as a Sub-Lieutenant on 1 January 1957, and serving aboard HMAS Sydney, an aircraft carrier.

After briefly serving as an exchange officer, S/Lt. Tasnim was sent to England again where he attended the Royal Naval College in Greenwich, from which he graduated and received a War studies degree with strong emphasis on nuclear war. Upon returning to Pakistan, he was promoted to lieutenant, and was posted as executive officer to Jahangir which he was until 1961. During this time, he was posted in East Pakistan, but returned shortly after he was appointed ADC to President Ayub Khan.

In 1963, Lt. Tasnim personally excused himself from his assignment in order to join a newly established crew that was to be trained in the United States so that they could operate a submarine acquired from the United States Navy. With Lt.Cdr K.R. Niazi, Lt. Tasnim arrived in New London in Connecticut where he was trained on USS Angler for submarine operations. In 1964, the crew returned to Pakistan and reported back to its base, Karachi Naval Dockyard.

=== War appointments in the Navy ===
By 1965, Lt. Cdr. Tasnim was the executive officer and Second-in-Command of PNS Ghazi, and participated in Pakistan's second war with India in 1965.

Ghazi, under command of Cdr. KR Niazi, escorted the combined task group under Cdre. S.M. Anwar, the OTC, to where they would successfully raid a radar facility in Dwarka, India. Ghazi later patrolled the Arabian sea and reported back safely to its base once the Soviet Union broke the India-Pakistan Tashkent Agreement ceasefire. Lt. Cdr. Tasnim and Ghazi were given the Sitara-e-Jurat in 1966.

In 1967, Lt. Cdr. Tasnim assumed the command of Ghazi and became responsible for her refit soon after. After refitting of her computers, Ghazi, under his command, embarked on circumnavigation of Africa and Southern Europe in order for her mid-life update to be carried out in the Gölcük Naval Shipyard in Turkey because of the closure of the Suez Canal caused by the Six-Day War.

After refit trials, Lt. Cdr. Tasnim returned to Karachi and later traveled to Paris to acquire a newly built Hangor-class submarine. There, he learned French and took over the command of PNS Hangor (S131) in 1969 as Commander.

Cdr. Tasnim arrived with Hangor on 1 December 1970 in Karachi. In August 1971, Cdr. Tasnim volunteered to go behind enemy lines to pick up intelligence on an Indian Navy movement, which was duly approved. In November 1971, Hangor sailed under his command again with a full wartime load of torpedoes, moving towards the Bombay harbour, identifying the Indian armada but not attacking without authorization. In an attempt to warn, Cdr. Tasnim broke radio silence and dispatched a message that was immediately identified, leading to the Indian Navy dispatching two ASW warships, INS Khukri and INS Kirpan from the 14th Squadron of the Indian Navy's Western Naval Command. The Indian squadron under Captain Mahendra Nath Mulla identified Hangor circa 3 December, and came forward to attack the submarine that was operating in shallow waters. Cdr. Tasnim ordered increase of submarine depth by 200m and the submarine began targeting Indian Navy ships that were now on their way to attack the submarine.

At about 20:00 hours, Cdr. Tasnim had his torpedo crew, led by Lt. Fasih Bokhari, calculate the enemy ship path and firing range, and ordered the crew to fire torpedoes. The first homing torpedo fired missed and did not hit Kirpan. A second homing torpedo was fired and it hit the magazine of Khukri. The crew of Hangor heard a loud explosion and began recording orders being passed by Cpt. M.N. Mullah, Khukri's captain. A third homing torpedo was fired but Kirpan dodged it and fled. Khukri sank before Hangor could make an attempt to save the survivors, resulting in 250 men (all on board) losing their lives including Cpt. Mahendra Nath Mulla.

For almost a week, Cdr. Tasnim had Hangor submerged because of a massive search and destroy mission, making his way back to her base with depleted hydrogen batteries. In a personal admission in 2001, Tasnim stated: "An extensive air search combined with surface ships made our life miserable but with intelligent evasive action we managed to survive these attacks and arrived in Karachi safely after the ceasefire."

=== Staff and Command appointments ===
Upon returning to Pakistan, Cdr. Tasnim was decorated with Sitara-e-Jurat for his actions of valor in 1972. In 1973, he was posted in Pakistan's Naval Headquarters in Islamabad, becoming director of submarine operations and assuming the command of submarine command (COMSUBS) in 1974. In 1975–76, Cdr. Tasnim went to the United States to attend the Rhode Island Naval War College, returning with a MSc. in war studies, and was appointed "Directing Staff" at the Naval War College in Karachi.

In 1976, he was promoted to a one-star rank, and was appointed as Director-General Naval Operations (DGNO) and then Naval Secretary at Navy NHQ in Islamabad. In 1978, Cdre. Tasnim was selected by the Ministry of Defence (MoD) for a diplomatic assignment, and briefly tenured as military attaché at the Embassy of Pakistan in Paris until 1981.

Upon returning, Cdre. Tasnim was made tactical commanding officer of the 25th Destroyer Squadron, later commandant of the Naval War College in Karachi and then the ACNS (Training) until he was promoted to a two-star rank. In 1984, Rear-Admiral Tasnim joined the faculty of National Defence University (NDU) in Islamabad, teaching military study courses of which then-Brig. Pervez Musharraf was his student. He remained Chief Instructor (CI) at the NDU until 1987.

In 1987–88, Rear-Admiral Tasnim was appointed DCNS (Personnel) and later became a senior fleet commander in 1989–91, as a three-star rank Vice-Admiral.

In 1991, Vice-Admiral Tasnim was appointed Chairman of the National Shipping Corporation which he stayed in until 1992, when he was made chairman of Karachi Port Trust (KPT), which he remained until his retirement from the Navy in 1994.

== Retirement and defence analyst ==
In 2001, Admiral Tasnim refuted the Indian Navy's claim that they sunk Ghazi, stating that "the sub was lost due to an operational accident and Indians have never claimed it as such."

In 2016, Admiral Tasnim backed the ISPR's claim of detecting the Indian Navy's submarine patrol off the Karachi coast, claiming that "the Indian submarine was detected 40 nautical miles off Pakistan's coast." Talking to Dawn, Tasnim was of the opinion that "the submarine had come for intelligence gathering purposes. Intelligence gathering is a common practice, but the skill is in not getting caught – like we did in our times."

== Popular culture ==
In December 2021, ARY Digital release a telefilm Hangor S-131, based on real life events from the Indo-Pakistani naval war of 1971 in which Tasnim was played by Zahid Ahmed. He is portrayed by Shahid Latif in the 2026 Indian film Border 2 which is based on different theatres of the Indo-Pakistani war of 1971, while the captain of INS Khukri is portrayed by Ahan Shetty.

== Awards and decorations ==

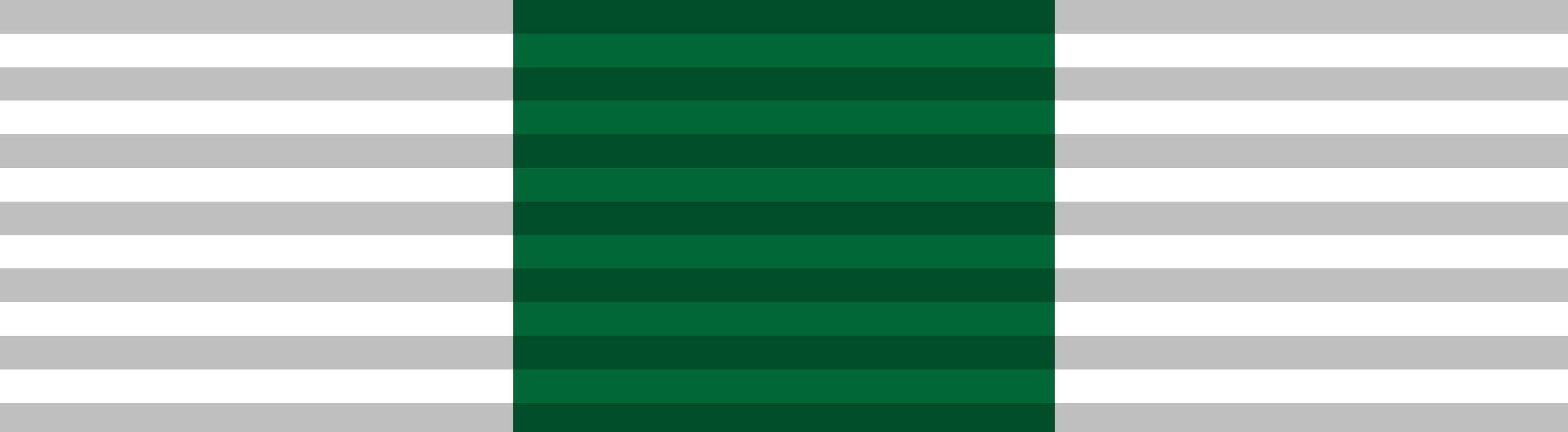

	Hilal-e-Imtiaz (Military) (Crescent of Excellence)		
Sitara-e-Jurat & Bar (Star of Courage): 1. 1965 War; 2. 1971 War	Sitara-e-Imtiaz (Military) (Star of Excellence)	Sitara-e-Basalat (Star of Good Conduct)	Tamgha-e-Diffa (General Service Medal): 1. 1965 War Clasp; 2. 1971 War Clasp
Sitara-e-Harb 1965 War (War Star 1965)	Sitara-e-Harb 1971 War (War Star 1971)	Tamgha-e-Jang 1965 War (War Medal 1965)	Tamgha-e-Jang 1971 War (War Medal 1971)
10 Years Service Medal	20 Years Service Medal	30 Years Service Medal	Tamgha-e-Sad Saala Jashan-e- Wiladat-e-Quaid-e-Azam (100th Birth Anniversary of Muhammad Ali Jinnah) 1976
Tamgha-e-Jamhuria (Republic Commemoration Medal) 1956	Hijri Tamgha (Hijri Medal) 1979	Jamhuriat Tamgha (Democracy Medal) 1988	Qarardad-e-Pakistan Tamgha (Resolution Day Golden Jubilee Medal) 1990

== See also ==
- Submarine warfare
- Hangor-class submarine (1968)
