= PNS Hangor =

PNS Hangor is the name of the following ships of the Pakistan Navy:

- PNS Hangor (S131), a Daphné-class submarine in commission 1970–2006, sank INS Khurki in 1971, now a museum ship at Pakistan Maritime Museum
- PNS Hangor (2024), lead Hangor-class submarine

== See also ==
- Hangor S-131, a film
