= Border 2 =

2026 Indian film by Anurag Singh

- Theatrical release poster
- Directed by: Anurag Singh
- Screenplay by: Sumit Arora; Anurag Singh
- Story by: Nidhi Dutta
- Produced by: J. P. Dutta; Nidhi Dutta; Bhushan Kumar; Krishan Kumar
- Starring: Sunny Deol; Varun Dhawan; Diljit Dosanjh; Ahan Shetty; Mona Singh; Sonam Bajwa; Medha Rana; Anya Singh
- Cinematography: Anshul Chobey
- Edited by: Manish More
- Music by: Score: John Stewart Eduri; Songs: Anu Malik; Mithoon; Sachet–Parampara; Vishal Mishra; Gurmoh
- Production companies: T-Series Films; J. P. Films
- Distributed by: AA Films
- Release date: 23 January 2026
- Running time: 201 minutes
- Country: India
- Language: Hindi
- Budget: ₹275 crore
- Box office: ₹464.5 crore

Border 2 is a 2026 Indian Hindi-language epic war film co-written and directed by Anurag Singh. A sequel to J. P. Dutta's 1997 film Border, it was produced by Bhushan Kumar, Krishan Kumar, J. P. Dutta, and Nidhi Dutta under the banners of T-Series Films and J. P. Films.

Set in India–Pakistan war of 1971, the film features the operations of the Indian Armed Forces. The film stars Sunny Deol in the leading role, alongside an ensemble cast including Varun Dhawan, Diljit Dosanjh, and Ahan Shetty. The movie also features Mona Singh, Sonam Bajwa, Medha Rana, and Anya Singh in pivotal roles.

The project was officially announced on 13 June 2024, on the 27th anniversary of the first film. Filming took place in early 2025 across military locations including Jhansi Cantonment, Babina Cantonment, the National Defence Academy (NDA) in Khadakwasla, and undisclosed air and naval bases. The INS Vikrant was used in filming.

The film's narrative is based on five major operations from the India–Pakistan war of 1971, including the Battle of Manawar Tawi, the Battle of Basantar, the Air defence of Srinagar, the Naval engagement involving the INS Khukri, and the enemy's air strikes of the Operation Chengiz Khan.

Border 2 was theatrically released on 23 January 2026, coinciding with the Republic Day weekend. It received positive reviews from critics. Commercially, Border 2 emerged as a blockbuster, earning ₹464.5 crore (US$50 million). It ranks as one of the highest-grossing Indian films of 2026, the 10th highest domestic net earner in Hindi cinema history, as well as the highest grossing Indian war film of all time.

== Plot ==
The film begins on 28 November 1971, when an armed group of Pakistani army scouts are reconnoitring an Indian Army post in Jammu and Kashmir near the border. They are intercepted and neutralized by Indian Army Lt Col Fateh Singh Kaler and his soldiers. Fateh recovers reconnaissance maps and other vital intelligence from the killed scouts and shares these findings with his CO at their regiment's HQ. From this data and prevailing circumstances, he infers that a full-scale India–Pakistan war is imminent and that the ultimate outcome will be decided on the western front. During this same window, Indian Army Major Hoshiar Singh Dahiya is posted in the Pathankot district in Punjab near the border; Indian Air Force Fg Offr Nirmal Jit Singh Sekhon is stationed at the Air Force Station in Srinagar district; and Indian Navy Lt Cdr Mahendra Singh Rawat is deployed aboard a frigate in the Arabian Sea near the Diu coast.

The story then flashes back to 1961 at the National War Academy, where the disciplined and strict Major Fateh Singh Kaler trains a new batch of tri-service officer cadets. There, they must endure three years of gruelling, common military training and undergraduate education before advancing to a final year of specialized instruction at their respective branch academies (Army, Air Force, and Navy). Under his rigorous supervision, three recruits – Hoshiar Singh Dahiya (Army), Nirmal Jit Singh Sekhon (Air Force), and Mahendra Singh Rawat (Navy) – develop an unbreakable personal bond. Fateh pushes them to their absolute physical and mental limits, deeply embedding the vital tenets of unified tri-service coordination and selfless dedication to the nation.

In 1965, Lt Col Fateh Singh Kaler suffers a devastating personal tragedy when his only son, Indian Army Captain Angad Singh Kaler, is killed in action during the India–Pakistan war of 1965. The loss creates a profound emotional rift between Fateh and his grieving wife, Simi. Struggling with internal sorrow, Fateh suppresses his grief to maintain his military commitment, ultimately accepting a deployment back to the frontlines.

Six years later, in mid-1971, geopolitical tensions culminate in active military mobilization along the border. Midway through Nirmal's wedding celebration at his village, Isewal, in Punjab, the three former academy peers are abruptly recalled to their respective units. Hoshiar bids farewell to his pregnant wife, Dhanwanti; Nirmal parts from his newly wedded bride, Manjit; and Mahendra leaves behind his wife, Sudha, and their young daughter. Deployed across separate branches of the Indian military, Major Hoshiar Singh Dahiya takes command of a company belonging to the 3rd Battalion of The Grenadiers Regiment in the Pathankot–Jammu sector. Meanwhile, Fg Offr Nirmal Jit Singh Sekhon joins the Indian Air Force's No. 18 Squadron in Srinagar, and Lt Cdr Mahendra Singh Rawat is assigned to the Indian Navy's 14th Frigate Squadron in the Arabian Sea. In early November 1971, full-scale war seems imminent, but with a substantial portion of the Indian military apparatus concentrated on the eastern theatre in East Pakistan, the western front is left structurally vulnerable with limited manpower and resources.

In the present timeline, the conflict escalates into a full-scale war on 3 December 1971, when Pakistan launches Operation Chengiz Khan – a series of preemptive aerial strikes targeting north–western Indian airfields, followed by coordinated ground and naval offensives. Concurrently, Fateh assumes command of the 6th Battalion of the Sikh Regiment and is ordered to take charge of Chak Peeran, a strategically vital Indian Army post across the crucial Mandiala Bridge in the critical Manawar Tawi region of the Jammu–Chumb sector. Upon arrival, Fateh discovers that the post has been seized by a Pakistani company under the command of Major Rasheed, who has brutally executed the captured Indian defenders. Fateh leads his battalion in a fierce counter-attack, defeats the occupying forces, kills Rasheed, and successfully recaptures the post.

On 9 December 1971, 40 nautical miles off the Diu coast, the Pakistani submarine PNS Hangor stalks and attacks Mahendra’s frigate in the treacherous depths of the Arabian Sea. Mahendra immediately orchestrates a high-stakes naval duel against the enemy sub. When catastrophic torpedo strikes rip through his frigate, engulfing it in flames, Mahendra refuses to abandon his post. As the vessel takes on water, he calmly coordinates the evacuation of his crew, saving dozens of lives. With the deck slipping beneath the waves, he executes one final, defiant act of duty – launching a decisive depth charge strike that neutralizes the enemy threat. Honouring the highest naval traditions, Mahendra chooses to go down with his ship, cementing his legacy in the depths he defended.

On 14 December 1971, as bombs rain down during an active Air attack on the Srinagar Airbase, Nirmal single-handedly scrambles his Folland Gnat Lightweight fighter into the smoke-filled skies of the Kashmir Valley. He immediately charges into a wave of six state-of-the-art enemy F-86 Sabre Air-superiority fighter jets. Outnumbered six to one, Nirmal executes a series of breathtaking, razor-sharp aerial maneuvers, turning the sky into a desperate shield for the vital base below. He successfully hammers the enemy formation, scoring direct hits on five Sabres and destroying them. However, the sheer weight of numbers catches up to him. During a dogfight with the final Sabre, he manages to shoot it down, but his fighter jet sustains fatal damage from the onslaught. At a critically low altitude, the aircraft plunges to the ground, killing him in action. His supreme sacrifice saves the airfield from certain destruction.

On the evening of that same day, the radio relays news of the martyrdom of Nirmal Jit Singh Sekhon and Mahendra Singh Rawat, along with the soldiers who fell a few days earlier in another fierce battle fought at Longewala. Hearing the tragic news of the loss of his closest friends, Nirmal and Mahendra, Hoshiar is deeply saddened and overcome with grief.

On the mainland, between 15 December and 17 December 1971, the ground war intensifies across multiple sectors. The Pakistani army launches a large-scale offensive at Manawar Tawi to recapture Chak Peeran and the crucial Mandiala Bridge from Fateh and his battalion. Facing a massive ground offensive of infantry and tanks led by Pakistani commander Lt Col Zaheer Khan, Fateh utilizes defensive fortifications and disciplined artillery coordination to hold the line. Despite sustaining heavy casualties and facing dwindling ammunition, Fateh rallies his remaining men to counter a final enemy breakthrough attempt. Employing clever anti-tank tactics, he personally orchestrates the destruction of the advancing armour, culminating in a fierce hand-to-hand combat sequence. After an intense and grueling engagement, Fateh’s unit breaks the enemy assault, neutralizes the advance, and captures Zaheer Khan as a prisoner of war. This secures a decisive victory at the Battle of Manawar Tawi, effectively halting the enemy's strategic push into Jammu and Kashmir.

Simultaneously, some 60-65 kilometres away from Fateh's location along the frontline, Hoshiar’s infantry company launches an offensive to capture an enemy stronghold at Bara Pind (Jarpal) in the Shakargarh salient, across the Basantar river in Punjab, Pakistan. Facing overwhelming artillery shelling, heavy MMG fire, and a deeply entrenched infantry defense, the assault quickly devolves into an intense trench battle characterized by brutal hand-to-hand bayonet combat. Undeterred by mounting casualties, Hoshiar moves from trench to trench, personally clearing several enemy bunkers despite sustaining severe injury. Hoshiar fights gallantly and successfully leads his company to an initial victory, securing a vital foothold that allows the regiment to consolidate its position against future enemy counter-attacks. However, unknown to them, a second, large armoured company commanded by Lt Col Khalid has advanced rapidly toward their position. The relentless enemy shelling and advancing tank columns eventually overwhelm the initial Indian defensive forces, leading to severe casualties.

Fresh off his victory at Manawar Tawi, Fateh receives word of the desperate situation at Bara Pind. He immediately mobilizes his remaining forces and marches to the sector, arriving just as the situation grows precarious. Fateh steps directly onto the chaotic frontline to reinforce Hoshiar and his company, where he kills Khalid during the height of the clash. Utilizing anti-tank weaponry, precise strategic positioning, and close tank support, Fateh and Hoshiar launch a fierce counteroffensive. Together, they turn the tide of the battle, neutralizing the remaining hostile armoured columns and forcing an enemy retreat to secure the western border. The ground offensive ends on 17 December 1971 with an official roll call back at the base. Standing before the remaining men, the weather-beaten but resolute Fateh and Hoshiar pay formal military tribute to the fallen heroes of the Battle of Basantar.

The film concludes on a solemn note as a grief-stricken Fateh visits a Gurdwara to offer prayers for the fallen soldiers. Amidst the poignant atmosphere, he remembers their valour and salutes the profound sacrifice of the martyrs, underscoring the heavy human cost of protecting national sovereignty.

== Cast ==
- Sunny Deol as Lt Col Fateh Singh Kaler — Indian Army officer from the 6th Battalion of the Sikh Regiment (loosely based on Brig. Hardev Singh Kler, MVC, AVSM)
- Varun Dhawan as Major Hoshiar Singh Dahiya, PVC — Indian Army officer from the 3rd Battalion of The Grenadiers Regiment
- Diljit Dosanjh as Fg Offr Nirmal Jit Singh Sekhon, PVC — Indian Air Force officer from the No. 18 Squadron
- Ahan Shetty as Lt Cdr Mahendra Singh Rawat — Indian Navy officer from the 14th Frigate Squadron (based on Captain Mahendra Nath Mulla, MVC)
- Mona Singh as Simi Kaler — Fateh's wife
- Sonam Bajwa as Manjit Sekhon — Nirmal's wife
- Medha Rana as Dhanwanti Dahiya — Hoshiar's wife
- Anya Singh as Sudha Rawat — Mahendra's wife
- Paramvir Cheema as Sub. Nishan Singh — Indian Army JCO from 3 Grenadiers
- Anurag Arora as Sub. Ram Singh — Indian Army JCO from 6 Sikh
- Vansh Bhardwaj as Sub. Santram — Indian Army JCO from 3 Grenadiers
- Ali Hassan as Lt Col Zaheer Khan — CO of Pakistani army at the Battle of Manawar Tawi
- Vaquar Shaikh as Lt Col Khalid — CO of Pakistani army at the Battle of Basantar
- Behzaad Khan as Captain Hasan Khan — Pakistani Scout Leader reconnoitring the Indian Army post in J&K near border
- Karan Mann as Major Rasheed — Pakistani army officer at Chak Peeran post on Manawar Tawi
- Ali Mughal as Maj. Akram Khan — 2i/c of Pakistani army at the Battle of Basantar
- Ishika Gagneja as Sukhminder Kaur — Nirmal's sister
- Hardip Gill as Flt Lt Tarlochan Singh Sekhon (ret'd) — Nirmal's father
- Neeta Mohindra as Harbans Kaur Sekhon — Nirmal's mother
- Guneet Sandhu as Captain Angad Singh Kaler — Fateh's son, Indian Army officer from the 7th Battalion of the Sikh Regiment
- Heeral Bhojwani as Ameeta Rawat — Mahendra and Sudha's daughter
- Madhur Arora as Gen. Yahya Khan
- Tejashwar Singh as Fg Offr Baldhir Singh Ghumman — Nirmal's wingman
- Sanjiv Chopra as Brig. Gurbachan Singh Cheema — Fateh's CO
- Pranav Vashisht as 2nd Lt Ajit Singh — Fateh's 2i/c
- Angad Singh as Sampooran Singh — JCO in 6 Sikh
- Azad Chauhan as Balam Singh — JCO in 3 Grenadiers
- Bhushan Vikas as Beniram Rao — JCO in 3 Grenadiers
- Ujjwal Gaurahha as Pashtun Rouhani — Pakistan Army soldier
- Kartik Phogat as Ashfaq Ali — Pakistan Army soldier
- Saad Baba as Lt Col Ved Prakash Airy — Hoshiar’s CO
- Imran Farooq as Rasheed Gul
- Harwinder Aujla as Gurjeet Singh — Fateh's 3rd in command
- Pali Sandhu as Jagat Singh — JCO in 6 Sikh
- Bashir Lone as Basheer Sheikh — War refugee from Chak Peeran village
- Ajay Sharma as Sajjad Rashid
- Aadarsh Barik as Saurav Nathuram Pingle
- Sandeep Sharma as Hoshiar's father-in-law
- Ashwani Oberoi as Hoshiar's uncle
- Amit Bhardwaj as Rajnish Singh
- Sushil Singh as Ustaad Mangal Singh
- Sabyasachi Misra as Wg Cdr Rajinder Singh — Nirmal's CO
- Atharva Bangale as ATC Officer
- Jasmine Khuranna as Sushma Kaur — Nirmal's mother-in-law
- Harman Singh Lakhia as Cousin Billo
- Abhinav Ranga as Lt Sagar Ranga — Mahendra's junior officer
- Asif Rehman as Cdr Surendra Singh — Mahendra's CO
- Atul Singh as Ramesh Vijayan
- Variksh Mehta as Ajay Sinha
- Shahid Latif as Cdr Ahmad Tasnim — CO of Pakistan Navy submarine PNS Hangor
- Gaurav Puri as Sailor Rifat Jawed on PNS Hangor
- Vimarsh Roshan as Viper Pilot V. Mangate
- Ujjwal Gaurahha as Shamsheer
- Umar Sharif as Pashtun — Nirmal's opponent in the dogfight
- Ali Raza as Mahendra's father
- Namrata Joshi as Mahendra's mother
- Ajay Mehra as Air Marshal Zafar Ahmad Chaudhry
- Karan Chibber as Vice Admiral Muzaffar Hassan
- Soumyarka Gupta as General Abdul Hameed Khan
- Hari Om Kalra as Lt. Gen. Sher Khan
- Umedh Singh as Randhir Singh — Army Postman
- Karan Jotwani as Venkatesh
- Suniel Shetty (cameo) as AC Bhairon Singh Rathore, SM — BSF officer attached to the Unit that fought the Battle of Longewala
- Akshaye Khanna (cameo) as 2nd Lt Dharamvir Singh Bhakhri — 2i/c in the Unit that fought the Battle of Longewala
- Puneet Issar (cameo) as Sub. Ratan Singh, VrC — Platoon leader in the Unit that fought the Battle of Longewala
- Sudesh Berry (cameo) as Nb. Sub. Mathura Das, SM — Section leader in the Unit that fought the Battle of Longewala

== Production ==
=== Development ===
Border 2 was officially announced by J. P. Dutta, Bhushan Kumar and Sunny Deol on 13 June 2024 on the 27th anniversary of the original film. Deol was retained from the original cast, although the makers did not reveal the other cast members.

=== Casting ===
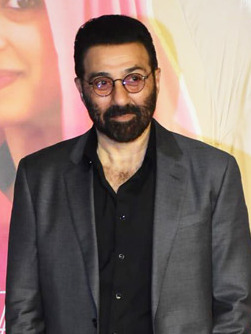
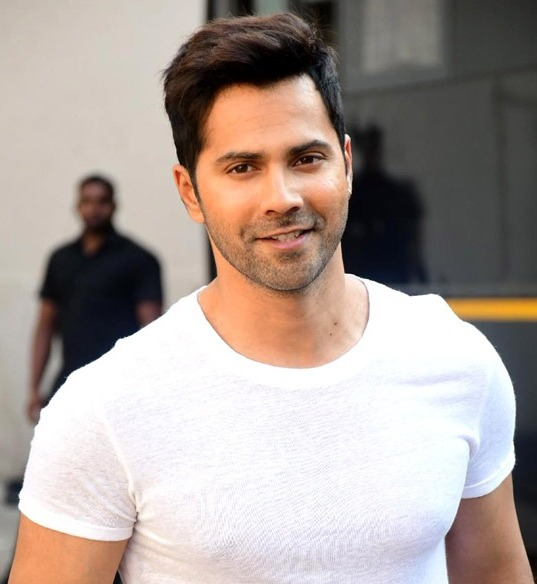
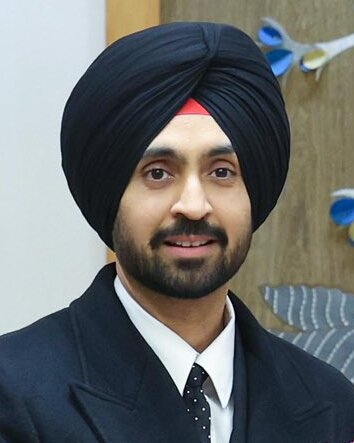
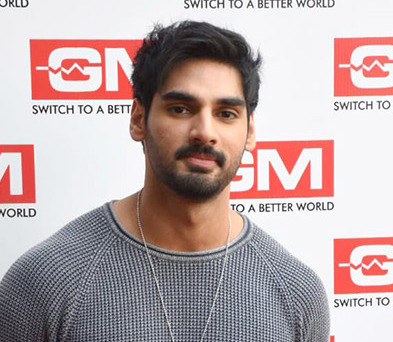
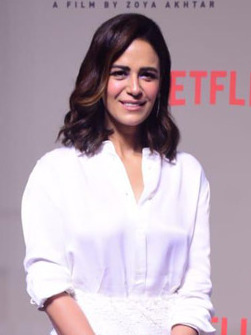
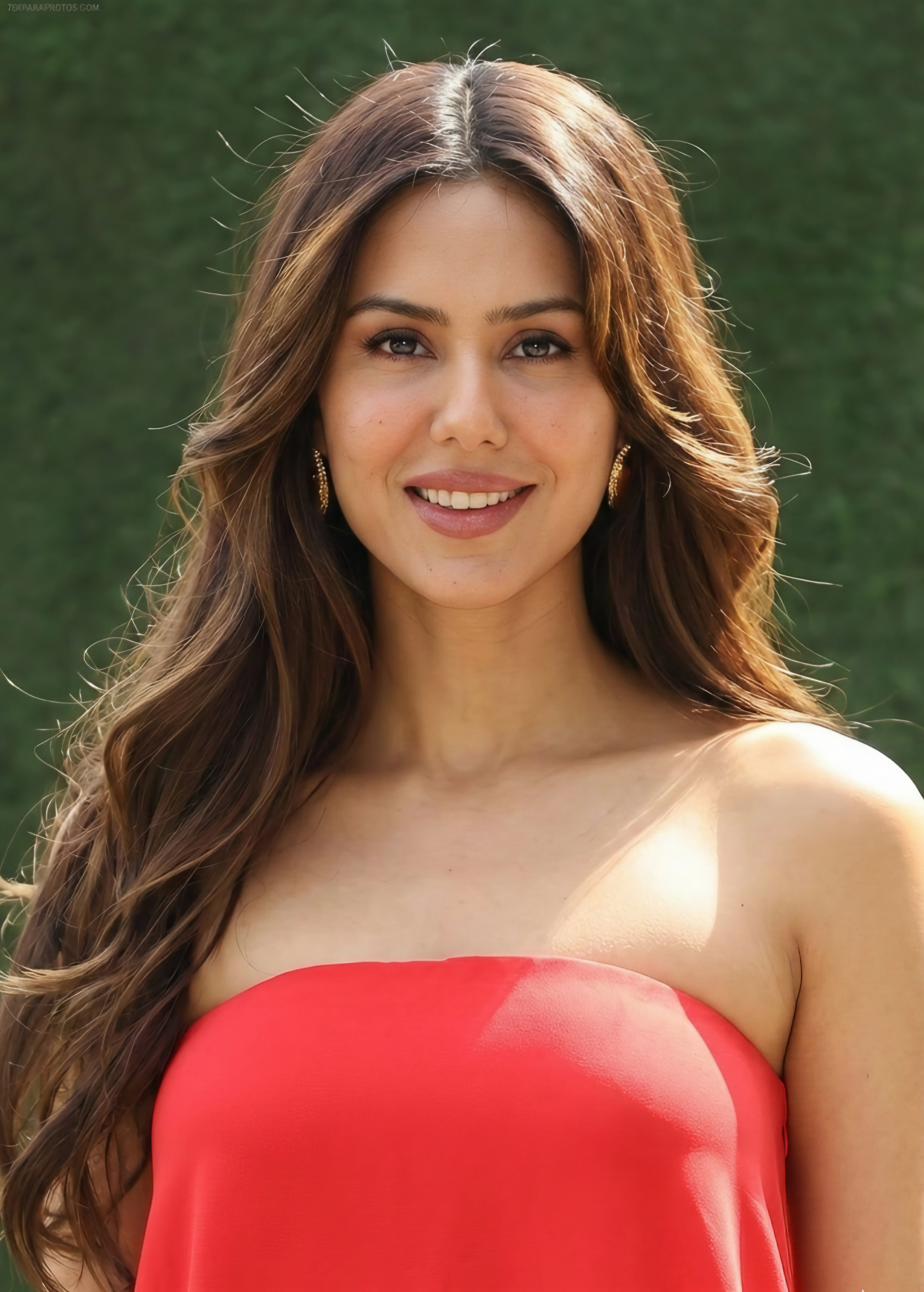
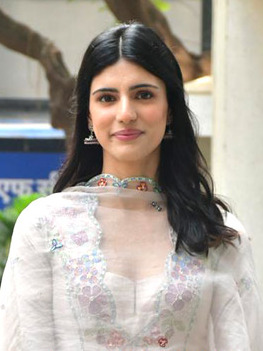
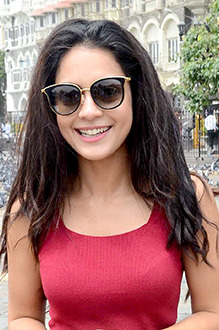
(L-R) Top row: Sunny Deol, Varun Dhawan, Diljit Dosanjh and Ahan Shetty; Bottom row: Mona Singh, Sonam Bajwa, Medha Rana and Anya Singh

Sunny Deol was offered the lead role following the success of Gadar 2 (2023). While J. P. Dutta proposed the sequel to Deol back in 2015, the project was put on hold due to several of Deol’s films underperforming at the box-office. Deol was also cautious about the sequel, wanting to ensure the story provided a natural evolution for the beloved original characters. He felt the script needed to justify a comeback to avoid disappointing fans who expect the same level of impact seen in Gadar 2. Following the success of his recent films, Deol agreed to star in the project. He plays the role of Indian Army officer Lieutenant Colonel Fateh Singh Kaler (loosely based on Brigadier Hardev Singh Kler).

Ayushmann Khurrana was rumoured to have been offered the role of Major Hoshiar Singh Dahiya. However, media reports indicated he was no longer part of the cast. There was no official confirmation as to whether he opted out or was dropped by the producers, leaving his exit a subject of speculation. Varun Dhawan was then cast to play the role. The makers announced his casting alongside Deol, Diljit Dosanjh, and Ahan Shetty. Shortly thereafter, his role was cemented in the public eye as behind-the-scenes footage from the shoot emerged. Diljit Dosanjh was signed to play the role of the Indian Air Force officer, Flying Officer Nirmal Jit Singh Sekhon. However, rumors surfaced that he had opted out of the film due to external project controversies. Despite the ambiguity that surrounded his status, it was later confirmed Dosanjh was firmly back on board and was set to star as one of the film's lead characters. Ahan Shetty joined the cast as a new recruit, a move that was officially announced by lead actor Deol. Ahan played the role of the Indian Navy officer, Lieutenant Commander Mahendra Singh Rawat (character based on Captain Mahendra Nath Mulla).

Mona Singh was cast opposite Deol. She portrays Simi, the wife of Fateh Singh Kaler. Sonam Bajwa was cast opposite Dosanjh. She portrays Manjit Kaur Sekhon, the wife of Nirmal Jit Singh Sekhon. Several media outlets reported actress Rashmika Mandanna was offered one of the other two female lead roles, although the casting was not confirmed. Medha Rana was cast opposite Dhawan. She portrays Dhanwanti Devi, the wife of Hoshiar Singh Dahiya. Anya Singh was cast opposite Ahan, portraying the role of Sudha, the wife of Mahendra Singh Rawat.

=== Filming ===
Principal photography commenced in early 2025. To portray military environments, the crew filmed at several Indian defense installations as well as on constructed sets. During the first phase in Uttar Pradesh and Madhya Pradesh in January 2025, the production kicked off in Jhansi Cantonment in UP and its adjoining bordering areas in MP, before proceeding to Babina Cantonment in UP. During this period, Sunny Deol and Varun Dhawan filmed pivotal sequences within these cantonment areas to establish a realistic setting for the film. In the second phase, which took place in Maharashtra from early to June 2025, a major portion of the film was filmed at the National Defence Academy (NDA) in Khadakwasla near Pune. This filming schedule focused on the protagonists' introductory sequences and training. Sunny Deol, Varun Dhawan, Diljit Dosanjh, and Ahan Shetty filmed scenes involving staged military drills, which included NCC cadets as background extras.

As production entered its third phase in Uttarakhand during mid - 2025, the focus shifted to the rugged terrain of Uttarakhand, which served as the primary backdrop for the film's combat sequences. Sunny Deol participated in this leg of the shoot, which combined constructed sets with natural landscapes to depict land and mountain warfare. In Halduwala, a village in Dehradun district, the production team built sets to replicate Kashmiri villages for the film's battle scenes. Additional filming occurred at Kimadi village and Santala Devi Temple. The production then expanded into Almora district, where scenes were filmed at historic sites including Jageshwar. The fourth phase took place in Punjab from mid – late 2025, where filming was done in the state, primarily in Amritsar district. Scenes were shot in local villages and on sets built to resemble military camps. After individual character arcs were completed by mid-2025, a final production phase occurred in December 2025. This period focused on the film's climax, which featured several large-scale action sequences. Additional filming was done in Jammu and Kashmir, Rajasthan, and Military Bases, following the initial schedule. In Srinagar, scenes were filmed at the Khanqah-e-Moula shrine. The Rajasthan portion of the shoot utilized Thar Desert terrain for desert warfare conditions. Production also took place at undisclosed air and naval bases for the sequences involving those military branches.

During the filming of Border 2, military experts were consulted to accurately depict the Indian and Pakistani militaries during the battles. The film utilized 1970s-era weaponry – including MMGs, LMGs, SLRs, Mortars, Browning Hi-Power Pistols and Jeep mounted RCLs – alongside Indian Army T-55 tanks standing in for Pakistani Patton tanks, and Indian Air Force’s Folland Gnat aircraft. In the film's climactic final scenes, Sunny Deol utilizes a Carl-Gustaf M2 Anti-Tank Rocket Launcher.

== Music ==
The film's background score is composed by John Stewart Eduri. The songs are composed by Anu Malik, Mithoon, Sachet–Parampara, Vishal Mishra and Gurmoh, with lyrics written by Javed Akhtar, Manoj Muntashir, Kausar Munir, Kumaar and Anurag Singh.

The songs' rollout began with the lead single, "Ghar Kab Aaoge", on 2 January 2026, followed by "Ishq Da Chehra" on 9 January and "Jaate Hue Lamhon" on 12 January. The remaining tracks in the collection were released on 14 January 2026.

The songs "Ghar Kab Aaoge", "Jaate Hue Lamhon", "Hindustan Meri Jaan", and "Mohabbat Ho Gayi Hai" are remixed versions of "Sandese Aate Hai", "To Chalun", "Hindustan Hindustan", and "Hamen Jab Se Mohabbat", respectively, from the first film.

== Release ==
=== Theatrical ===
Border 2 was theatrically released on 23 January 2026, aligning with India's Republic Day weekend. The first poster and the release date were unveiled on the 79th Indian Independence Day, with the film's tagline "Hindustan ke liye ladenge... phir ek baar!" (We will fight for India... once again!) prominently featured to evoke patriotic sentiment.

The film was banned in various GCC countries as it was perceived as having 'anti-Pakistan' content.

=== Home media ===
The film's post-theatrical digital streaming rights were acquired by Netflix for a reported ₹225 crore. The film began streaming on the platform from 20 March 2026.

== Reception ==
=== Critical reception ===
Border 2 received positive reviews from critics and audiences alike, with many hailing it as a thunderous war epic that perfectly honours the legacy of the 1997 original. On the review aggregator website Rotten Tomatoes, 69% of 13 critics' reviews are positive, with an average rating of 6/10.

Taran Adarsh gave Border 2 a highly positive review, awarding the film 4.5 out of 5 stars and labelling it "OUTSTANDING". Writing for his social media platform upon its release on January 23, 2026, Adarsh described the film as a "thunderous, emotionally charged war epic" that successfully honors the legacy of the 1997 original. He praised director Anurag Singh for balancing large-scale spectacle with deep sentiment. Adarsh lauded Sunny Deol as the "beating heart" of the film, noting his "commanding and righteous" presence. Bollywood Hungama gave the film 4.5 stars out of 5, praising the writing, direction, emotional quotient, performances and action sequences, while feeling some visual effects could have been better and the length, a little shorter. Simran Singh from Daily News and Analysis similarly gave it 4.5 stars out of 5 and described it as one of the best war films. She wrote "The makers of Border 2 are in sync with the sentiments of the audience, and thus, they delivered one of the best war dramas of this decade. A film that will become a classic, and a textbook for future generations on how to up the ante and deliver the next-to-impossible task". Noted film critic and film trade analyst, Subhash K Jha gave the film 4.5 out of 5 stars saying, "When J. P. Dutta made the genre-defining Border in 1997, little did he know that 29 years later, this spirited spiritual sequel, if one may call it that, would be an absolute winner". News18 gave the film 4 out of 5 stars. Grace Cyril, writing for the news channel, praised the film's pacing, noting its refusal to "rush into war" allowed for significant character development. She highlighted the focus on the soldiers' domestic lives, training, and interpersonal bonds, arguing this emotional groundwork prevents the characters from appearing as "faceless soldiers" and heightens the narrative impact of the ensuing conflict.

Devesh Sharma of Filmfare rated it 3.5/5 stars and wrote "Ultimately, Border 2 works best as a tribute, not a reinvention. It honours real heroes, celebrates inter-service unity, delivers rousing action and solid performances, and provides audiences with the comforting familiarity of patriotic spectacle". Deepa Gahlot of Rediff.com rated it 3.5/5 stars and observed "Border 2 stands out because it treats soldiers not as killing machines, but as human beings first." Rishabh Suri of Hindustan Times gave 3.5 stars out of 5 and said "Overall, Border 2 is not content with being just another sequel. It wants to make you sit up and salute. While its excesses are hard to ignore, so is its sincerity."

Archika Khurana of The Times of India gave 3 stars out of 5 and said "Border 2 is a solid, emotionally resonant, and technically accomplished war film that honours its legacy without being shackled by it. It may not redefine the genre, but it confidently reinforces the enduring power of big-screen patriotic cinema. Watch it for Sunny Deol’s roaring presence, its rousing spirit, and the emotion it wears proudly on its sleeve." Shubhra Gupta of The Indian Express gave 3 stars out of 5 and wrote "Border 2 makes sure our intrepid soldiers let the enemy jawans off when the latter remind them of their humanity even if that humanity is reserved only for ‘our’ men, theirs are full of bombast and pettiness." Saibal Chatterjee of NDTV awarded 3 stars out of 5 and commented that "Border 2 has come at a time when Hindi movies embrace jingoism with all their might. Although clearly mindful of what might work and what might not in the current climate, the film walks a tightrope that is often in danger of flying off its tether. If it doesn't, it is solely because Border 2 retains some remnants of the principles of yore".

=== Box office ===
Border 2 was a blockbuster hit, grossing a worldwide total of ₹464.5 crore (US$50 million), including ₹406.79 crore (US$43 million) in India and ₹57.71 crore (US$6.2 million) overseas.

== Sequel ==
Following the film's blockbuster success, producer Bhushan Kumar announced that a standalone sequel, Border 3, will soon enter development. A joint production between T-Series and J. P. Films, the film will be directed by Anurag Singh and star Sunny Deol in the lead role. On June 22, 2026, J. P. Films and producer Nidhi Dutta unveiled a new lineup of five upcoming projects, highlighted by Border 3 and a biopic centred on Lt Gen. Harbaksh Singh.
