= Hangor-class submarine =

Class of Pakistan air-independent cruise missile submarines

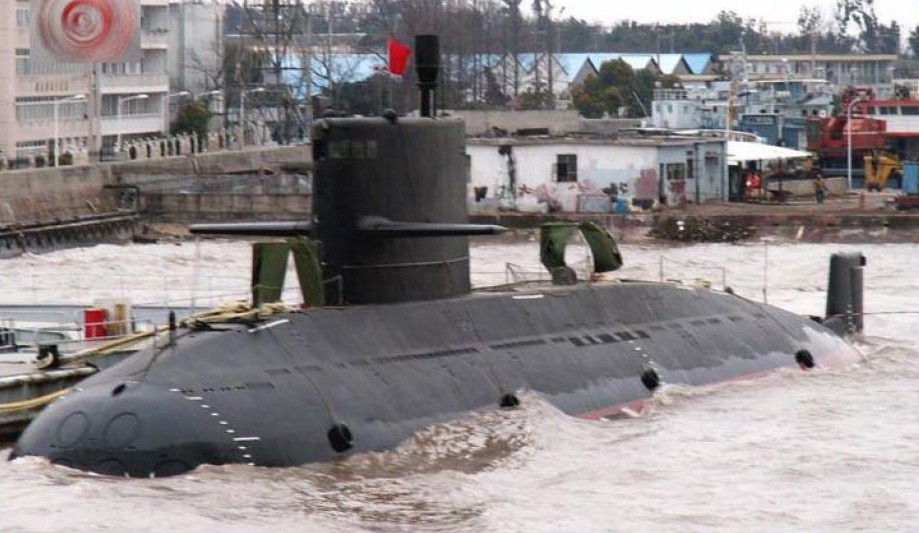
- The Type 039B submarine, the baseline design of the Hangor-class submarine.

Class overview
- Name: Hangor class
- Builders: China Shipbuilding Industry Corporation (First four submarines); Karachi Shipyard & Engineering Works (Final four submarines)
- Operators: Pakistan Navy
- Preceded by: Agosta 90B-class submarine
- Cost: US$4–5 billion for 8 vessels (Estimated)
- In commission: (30 April 2026–2028)
- Planned: 8
- Building: 4
- Completed: 4
- Active: 1

General characteristics
- Type: Attack submarine
- Displacement: 2,800 t (2,800 long tons)
- Length: 76 m (249 ft 4 in)
- Beam: 8.4 m (27 ft 7 in) (Estimated)
- Draught: 6.2 m (20 ft 4 in)
- Propulsion: 4 x CSOC CHD620 diesel engines; Stirling-powered air-independent propulsion
- Speed: 20 knots (37 km/h; 23 mph)
- Range: ~8,500 nmi (15,700 km; 9,800 mi)
- Crew: ~36
- Notes: Pakistan-specific variant of Type 039A submarine

The Hangor-class submarines are a class of diesel–electric attack submarines currently being manufactured by a joint-partnership of the China Shipbuilding Industry Corporation (CSIC) and the Karachi Shipyard & Engineering Works (KSEW) for the Pakistan Navy (PN). Eponymously christened after PNS Hangor, a Daphné-class submarine that sank an Indian frigate in the 1971 Indo-Pakistani War, the class is an export derivative of the Chinese-origin Type 039A attack submarine, currently operated by the People's Liberation Army Navy (PLAN). First unveiled to the public in 2018, the future submarines are envisaged to undertake anti-access/area denial operations within Pakistan's exclusive economic zone, through the use of heavyweight torpedoes and anti-ship cruising missiles.

Pakistan's Ministry of Defence (MoD) ordered eight submarines from China in 2015, at an approximate cost of US$4–5 billion, making it the largest arms export contract in China's military history. Of the eight ordered examples, the initial four are being built by CSIC in China, while the latter four are to be built in Pakistan by KSEW, under a technology transfer agreement. Four of the submarines have already been constructed and launched in China, and in an interview with Chinese state media, Pakistan's naval chief, Admiral Naveed Ashraf, said that the first batch of Hangor-class submarines will enter active service with the Pakistan Navy in 2026.

On 30 April 2026, the first Hangor-class submarine, PNS Hangor, was officially commissioned by the Pakistan Navy with a ceremony in Sanya, China.

== History ==
=== Background ===
Since the dissolution of British rule in the Indian subcontinent in 1947, Pakistan and India engaged each other in a series of armed conflicts in 1947–48, 1965, 1971 and in 1999. Of the aforementioned conflicts, the Pakistan Navy (PN) and its eastern counterpart, the Indian Navy confronted each other in 1971 with the use of submarine assets playing an important role. During both episodes and again in 2001, the Indian Navy orchestrated a slew of naval blockades against Pakistan in the Arabian Sea, which adversely affected the PN's ability to facilitate anti-access operations. Following the conclusion of the 2001 conflict, the PN noted that its ability to enforce naval deterrence with the use of its submarines was adversely inadequate, which consequently instigated an exigency to augment the submarine fleet with newer boats.

In 2008, the PN approached several naval conglomerates, namely DCNS (now Naval Group) and Howaldtswerke-Deutsche Werft (HDW), with the intention of purchase a series of attack submarines. While DCNS offered its Marlin-class submarine, HDW offered its Type 214 submarine. The same year, Pakistan agreed to purchase three Type 214 submarines at a then-estimated cost of €773.7 million. However, owing to a dearth of public funds due to the 2008 financial crisis and the high cost of the submarines forced Pakistan to terminate the proposed deal.

In 2011, Pakistan initiated negotiations with the China Shipbuilding & Offshore International (CSOC) – the trade arm of the Chinese state-owned China Shipbuilding Industry Corporation (CSIC), for the purchase of six diesel-powered attack submarines equipped with air-independent propulsion systems (AIP). Although no details were ever revealed about the design of the speculated submarines, many observers surmised that the design in question may have been the Type 032 Qing-class submarine, a variant of the Type 039A Yuan-class submarine.

=== Purchase ===
In April 2015, during a briefing to the National Assembly Standing Committee on Defence, PN representatives disclosed that the Pakistani government, then headed by prime minister Nawaz Sharif, had approved the purchase of eight attack submarines from China, at an estimated cost of US$4–5 billion. Although no details regarding the approved submarines were disclosed, officials disclosed that Pakistan had been looking at an export design of the Yuan class, denoted as the S20. In October of the same year, Pakistan's minister of defense production Rana Tanveer Hussain announced that the deal for the eight submarines had been finalized, dislosing that four of the vessels would be built in China and Pakistan, respectively.

One year later, in April 2016, the PN publicly disclosed that the Karachi Shipyard & Engineering Works (KSEW) had been selected as the Pakistani shipyard tasked with the production of the four submarines. Six months later, in October 2016, the director of the CSIC confirmed the sale of the submarines to Pakistan during an interview with the Chinese state-run People's Daily Online media outlet. The total cost of the deal, which had then been estimated at a total US$4–5 billion, interpreted an approximate cost of $500 million per submarine, although other sources have argued that the actual price could be lower, at $250–325 million per submarine.

== Design ==
=== S26 design ===
Although no information regarding the design characteristics of the class were ever revealed, it is thought that the submarine's design is likely based on the S26, an export-centric design developed by the CSOC that draws on the Type 039A submarine. The S26 in turn is thought to be an AIP-equipped variant of the S20 diesel-electric submarine design unveiled by the China Shipbuilding Trading Corporation (CSSC) in 2013. In addition to the PN, the Royal Thai Navy (RTN) also ordered three examples of the S26 (locally designated as the S26T) in 2017.

According to CSIC, the S26 is a double-hulled design powered by AIP, with an estimated length and beam width of 77.7 m (254 ft 11 in) and 8.6 m (28 ft 3 in) respectively, with an approximate displacement of about 2,550 t (2,510 long tons). The design's teardrop-shaped hull can accommodate a crew complement of 38, plus 8 additional special forces personnel. The entire hull is built from continuously cast 921A and 980 steel (with yield strengths of 590–745 MPa and 785 MPa), while the hull-sections are assembled using modular construction methodology. Altogether, the S-26 is divided into six compartments: the first being the weapons and fore battery compartment, followed by the command compartment, the living quarters and aft battery compartment, the diesel-engine and generator compartment, the AIP compartment, and the shaft machinery and driving motor compartment.

=== Propulsion ===
For propulsion, the S26 originally used four MTU 12V 396 SE84 marine engines, manufactured by MTU Friedrichshafen. However, following a 2021 discovery revealing the dual-use of the German-made MTU engines on Chinese warships, in spite of a European Union-imposed embargo restricting the sale of military technology to China, the export of the engines to both the submarines of both the PN and the Royal Thai Navy (RTN) were consequently blocked. As an alternative to the MTU 12V 396 SE84, the CSOC reportedly offered a Chinese-made engine, dubbed the CHD620. Although it is currently unclear if the RTN has accepted the CHD620, several sources have reported that the PN had tested and accepted the engine.

In addition to the engines, the submarines are also set to be equipped with a Stirling-powered air-independent propulsion (AIP), developed by CSIC's 711th Institute. According to public information divulged by the CSIC, the S26 is reported to have a maximum diving depth of about 300 m (984 ft 3 in). Powered by four CSOC CHD620 diesel engines, the Hangor class has a top speed of approximately 20 knots (37 km/h; 23 mph), a range of 2,000 nautical miles (3,700 km; 2,300 mi), and can operate for 65 days.

=== Armament ===
The information regarding the weapon systems and the armament are classified and subjected to defense speculations. Some sources have postulated that the move to deploy the Babur-III nuclear missile on the submarines could be a possible attempt by Pakistan to develop an assured second-strike nuclear deterrence capability capable of rivalling India's naval second-strike capabilities. It is believed that the Hangor class will likely be armed with six 533 mm (21 in) torpedo tubes and anti-ship cruise missiles; additionally, it is likely that Pakistan's Babur-3 submarine-launched cruise missiles (SLCMs) are compatible with the submarines as well.

=== Naming ===
In January 2017, Admiral Muhammad Zakaullah, the-then PN Chief of Naval Staff, announced that the eight future submarines would be eponymously christened as the Hangor class, after PNS Hangor (S131), a Daphné-class submarine which the PN had used to sink INS Khukri, a Blackwood-class frigate of the Indian Navy, during the Indo-Pakistani naval hostilities of 1971. In December 2021, the PN revealed that the first submarine of the batch being built by Pakistan would be named as the Tasnim, after Vice admiral Ahmad Tasnim, a retired PN officer who had commanded the original Hangor (S131) when it sank Khukri.

== Construction ==
=== Infrastructure ===
Following the finalization of the deal in 2015, several sources postulated that the four submarines to be built by Pakistan would be constructed at the PN's Submarine Rebuild Complex (SRC) in Ormara. However, no significant construction work was ever observed there. Between 2015 and 2016, open-source intelligence inputs revealed that KSEW had expanded its infrastructure capabilities at its Karachi facility, indicating that the submarines would be built there. Prior to the deal for the eight submarines, KSEW had also built two of its three French-designed Agosta-90B submarines, namely Saad and Hamza, at its facilities between 2002 and 2008.

Among the expanded infrastructure included a twin-lane construction hall capable of constructing two submarines in parallel, a new Syncrolift drydock with an estimated lifting capacity of 7,881 t (7,757 long tons) and additional berthing facilities. Incidentally, the construction halls are placed close to the PN's main submarine berths at the Pakistan Naval Dockyard.

In October 2020, Zafar Mahmood Abbasi, the PN's then-Chief of Naval Staff, disclosed that the PN would acquire one Type 039A submarine from PLAN on a gratis basis (i.e., at no additional charge) for training and acclimation purposes.

=== Progress ===
Following Xi Jinping's visit to Pakistan in 2015, the Pakistani Navy signed a deal with China Shipbuilding & Offshore International Co. to produce 8 Hangor-II-class submarines for its fleet. Four ships were to be built by Wuchang Shipbuilding Industry Group (WSIG) in Wuhan, China. The other four were to be built by Karachi Shipyard & Engineering Works in Pakistan by means of technological transfer. Publications from the U.S. Naval Institute indicate that Jinnah Naval Base is likely to be used in the future to house some or all of these vessels.

The construction progress of the eight vessels was never revealed by the PN or the CSIC. Though the initial timetable called for completion of all ships between 2022 and 2028, it was announced in 2016 that four ships would be launched between 2022 and 2023, with the final four ships being completed by 2028. Production was stalled, though, by the refusal of Germany in the early 2020s to provide end-use certification approval for the installation of Rolls Royce MTU396 diesel engines needed to operate the vessels at full capacity. German authorities in March 2022 cited an arms embargo imposed on the PRC in the aftermath of the 1989 Tiananmen Square Massacre in their decision to restrict the export of retrofitted engines to shipbuilding companies producing subs for the Thai and Pakistani Navies, though notably not for Chinese domestic manufacturers.

In December 2021, in a rare public announcement on the progress of the project, KSEW announced that it had conducted a steel-cutting ceremony for the Tasnim, the first submarine of its batch. The keel for the Tasnim was laid nearly a year later in December 2022.

In October 2023, Thai officials exited a $400 million deal signed in 2017 with the Chinese to purchase variants of the Yuan-class S26T, citing doubts about the reliability of Chinese variants on the MTU design (though they later agreed to continue). The Thai order was due prior to the Pakistanis', meaning that its cancellation freed up factors of production for the Pakistanis who, in contrast, were willing to retrofit their ships with Chinese CHD 620 diesel engines. The first submarine was launched at Wuchang's Shuangliu Base on 26 April 2024, with Admiral Naveed Ashraf of the Pakistan Navy serving as Chief Guest in attendance.

A very low frequency (VLF) station in the Pakistani province of Sindh, commissioned as PNS Hameed, was funded by the Pakistan Navy to facilitate secure submarine communications which are vital for successful submarine missions.

Three of the submarines have already been constructed and launched in China, and in an interview with Chinese state media, Pakistan's naval chief, Admiral Naveed Ashraf, said that the first batch of Hangor-class submarines will enter active service with the Pakistan Navy in 2026.

== Ships in the class ==
Pennant Number	Name	Builder	Launched	Commissioned	Status
	Hangor	China China Shipbuilding & Offshore International Co. Ltd (CSOC)	26 April 2024	30 April 2026	Active
	Shushuk	China China Shipbuilding & Offshore International Co. Ltd (CSOC)	15 March 2025		Launched, undergoing sea trials.
	Mangro	China China Shipbuilding & Offshore International Co. Ltd (CSOC)	15 August 2025		Launched, undergoing sea trials.
	Ghazi	China China Shipbuilding & Offshore International Co. Ltd (CSOC)	17 December 2025		Launched, undergoing sea trials.
	Tasnim	Pakistan Karachi Shipyard & Engineering Works (KSEW)			Keel laid; currently under construction.
	Seem Maai	Pakistan Karachi Shipyard & Engineering Works (KSEW)			Keel laid; currently under construction.
	(??)	Pakistan Karachi Shipyard & Engineering Works (KSEW)			
	(??)	Pakistan Karachi Shipyard & Engineering Works (KSEW)			

== See also ==
=== Other submarines of notable comparison ===
- Type 214 submarine – A class of export-oriented diesel-electric attack-submarines, also developed by ThyssenKrupp Marine Systems and currently operated by the navies of Greece, Portugal, South Korea and Turkey.
- Type 212 submarine – A class of diesel-electric attack-submarines developed by ThyssenKrupp Marine Systems and exclusively built for the navies of Germany, Italy and Norway.
- Scorpène-class submarine – A class of export-oriented diesel-electric attack-submarines, jointly developed by Naval Group and Navantia and currently operated by the navies of Chile, Malaysia, India and Brazil.
- Sōryū-class submarine – A class of diesel-electric attack-submarines, built by Mitsubishi Heavy Industries and operated by Japan.
- Kilo-class submarine – A class of conventionally-powered submarines operated by the navies of Russia, China, India, Myanmar, Vietnam, Iran, Poland, Algeria and Romania.

=== Other references to the Pakistan Navy ===
- List of active ships in the Pakistan Navy.
- Agosta-class submarine – A series of diesel-electric attack-submarines designed by Naval Group and currently in active service with the Pakistan Navy.
