= INS Khukri =

The following ships of the Indian Navy have been named Khukri:

- HMIS Kukri was a River-class frigate of the Royal Indian Navy, launched in 1942 as HMS Trent she was transferred to India and renamed Kukri in 1946. Subsequently became INS Khukri and on conversion into a surveying ship in 1951 renamed Investigator. She was scrapped in 1975
- INS Khukri (F149) was a Type 14, Blackwood-class frigate commissioned in 1958, which served in the Portuguese-Indian War and the Indo-Pakistani War of 1971. During the War of 1971, the Indian frigate was sunk by the Pakistan Navy submarine Hangor. This was the first warship sunk by a submarine since World War II.
- INS Khukri (P49) was the lead ship of her class launched in 1989, serving under both the Eastern and Western fleets of the Indian Navy in her 32 years of service before being decommissioned in 2021.
