= PS Lespwar =

Seychellios Patrol Vessel

PS Lespwar is an Adamaya-class Fast Patrol vessel in service with the Seychelles Coast Guard. The ship was built at GSL in India and had served with the Indian Coast Guard before being handed over to the Seychelles government. Indian Prime minister Narendra Modi presented the ship to Seychelles President Patrick Herminie during a state visit on 27 June 2026. India also transferred six ambulances, ten multi-utility vehicles, four SUV's and five laser radial boats to the SCG.

== See also ==
- INS Kirpan
- PS Constant
- PS Topaz
