= MDL-class patrol vessel =

Indian light patrol boat

Class overview
- Name: MDL-class
- Builders: Mazagon Dock Limited
- Operators: Indian Coast Guard
- Preceded by: Adamya class
- Built: 2024 – present
- Planned: 14
- Building: 8
- Completed: 0

General characteristics
- Type: Fast patrol vessel
- Displacement: 300 tonnes (295 long tons)
- Length: 55 metres (180 ft 5 in)
- Propulsion: 3 × Everllence 16V175D high-speed engines [2,960 kW (3,970 hp)]; Waterjet propulsion systems
- Speed: in excess of 33 kn (61 km/h)
- Armament: 1 × 30 mm main gun; 2 x 12.7 mm gun

The MDL-class patrol vessels are a class of 14 fast patrol vessels being built by Mazagon Dock Shipbuilders for the Indian Coast Guard.

== History ==
The Defense Ministry on 24 January 2024 signed a ₹1,070 crore (equivalent to ₹11 billion or US$120 million in 2026) contract for multi role FPVs will be indigenously designed, developed and manufactured by MDL under Buy (Indian-IDDM) Category and all boats will be delivered by 63 months from signing. The primary role of the FPVs will include patrolling coastal waters and protecting fisheries. It also has secondary roles like high-speed search and rescue missions in shallow or coastal waters, MEDEVAC operations, providing logistics support and communication links as well as provide coastal convoy escorts.

On 26 August 2025, Mazagon Dock placed an order for 42 powerplants from Everllence to power the fast patrol vessels. Each vessel will be powered by three 16V175D high-speed engines each, all rated at 2,960 kW (3,970 hp), coupled with waterjet propulsion systems. The combined propulsion systems will help the vessels achieve a speed in excess of 33 kn (61 km/h). The 175D engines, slated for delivery between December 2025 and December 2027, features an eco-friendly design with a low fuel consumption and is compliant with the latest exhaust gas emission standards.

== Features ==
The FPVs will be equipped with multipurpose drones and wirelessly-controlled remote water rescue craft for surveillance and anti-smuggling operations in India's Exclusive Economic Zone.

The vessels are being equipped with state-of-the-art equipment like AI based predictive maintenance system along with indigenous components including gear boxes by M/s Triveni, Mysore and water jets by M/s MJP India. They have a displacement of 340 tonnes l, optimised for coastal security and law enforcement operations.

Steel cutting ceremony for the first FPV was held at Mazagon Dock on 19 December 2024. The keel for the first patrol vessel (Y16501) was laid on 27 May 2025, DIG Atul Parlikar, TM, OIC-CGSD(Mbi) presided the Keel laying ceremony.

Commencement of the production of the second vessel (Y16502) was done along with the second vessel of NGOPV project on 24 March 2025. Keel laying for the second vessel was undertaken on 31 October 2025 along with the steel cutting for the fifth vessel.

Production of the third and fourth vesse began on 25 March 2025. Keel for the third vessel was laid on 30 January 2026 alongside the commencement of the production of the sixth vessel.

The keel for the fifth vessel (16505) and commencement of the eight vessel (16508) began on 16 October 2026.

The deliveries will begin from March 2026.

== Ships in class ==
Name	Yard	Pennant No.	Steel Cutting	Keel Laid	Launched	Delivered	Commissioned	Home Port	Status
Indian Coast Guard
—N/a	16501	—N/a	19 December 2024	27 May 2025	—N/a	—N/a	March 2026	—N/a	Under construction
—N/a	16502	—N/a	24 March 2025	31 October 2025	—N/a	—N/a	December 2026	—N/a	Under construction
—N/a	16503	—N/a	25 March 2025	30 January 2026	—N/a	—N/a	Q1 2027	—N/a	Under construction
—N/a	16504	—N/a	25 March 2025	6 April 2026	—N/a	—N/a	Q1 2027	—N/a	Under construction
—N/a	16505	—N/a	31 October 2025	16 October 2026	—N/a	—N/a	—N/a	—N/a	Under construction
—N/a	16506	—N/a	30 January 2026	—N/a	—N/a	—N/a	—N/a	—N/a	Under construction
—N/a	16507	—N/a	6 April 2026	—N/a	—N/a	—N/a	—N/a	—N/a	Under construction
—N/a	16508	—N/a	16 October 2026	—N/a	—N/a	—N/a	—N/a	—N/a	Under construction
—N/a	16509	—N/a	—N/a	—N/a	—N/a	—N/a	—N/a	—N/a	Ordered
—N/a	16510	—N/a	—N/a	—N/a	—N/a	—N/a	—N/a	—N/a	Ordered
—N/a	16511	—N/a	—N/a	—N/a	—N/a	—N/a	—N/a	—N/a	Ordered
—N/a	16512	—N/a	—N/a	—N/a	—N/a	—N/a	—N/a	—N/a	Ordered
—N/a	16513	—N/a	—N/a	—N/a	—N/a	—N/a	—N/a	—N/a	Ordered
—N/a	16514	—N/a	—N/a	—N/a	—N/a	—N/a	—N/a	—N/a	Ordered

either scheduled or estimated dates
