= Adamya-class patrol vessel =

Indian light patrol boat

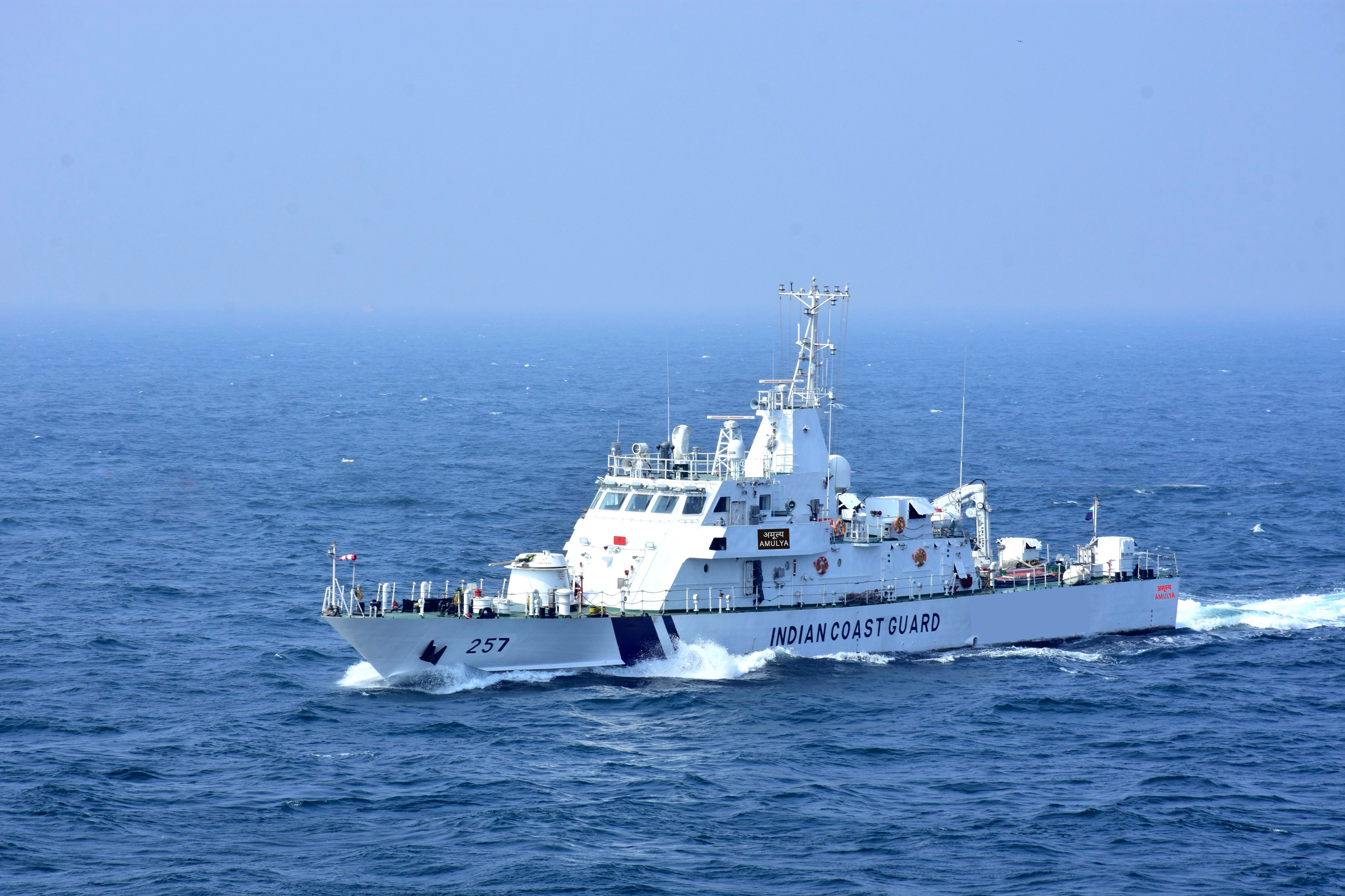
- Amulya (258) during a patrol.

Class overview
- Builders: Goa Shipyard Limited, Goa, India
- Operators: Indian Coast Guard; Seychelles Coast Guard
- Preceded by: Aadesh class
- Succeeded by: MDL class
- Built: 2023 – present
- In commission: 2025 – present
- Planned: 9
- Building: 1
- Completed: 8
- Active: 7

General characteristics
- Type: Fast patrol vessel
- Displacement: 320 tonnes (315 long tons)
- Length: 51.43 m (168 ft 9 in)
- Beam: 8 m (26 ft 3 in)
- Draught: <2.5 m (8 ft 2 in)
- Propulsion: 2 × 3,000 kW (4,000 hp) diesel engines; 2 × Controllable pitch propellers
- Speed: 28 knots (52 km/h; 32 mph) (Maximum); 14 knots (26 km/h; 16 mph) (Cruise)
- Range: 1500 nm at cruising speed with 25% reserve fuel capacity
- Endurance: 5 days
- Complement: 5 officers and 34 personnel
- Armament: 1 × CRN 91 Naval Gun; 2 × OFT 12.7 mm M2 Stabilized Remote Controlled Gun

Adamya-class patrol vessel is a series of eight fast patrol vessels (FPVs) being built for the Indian Coast Guard by Goa Shipyard Limited in Vasco da Gama, Goa.

== Design ==
GSL-class vessels have a length of 52 meters and a beam of 8 meters with a design speed of over 27 knots. These vessels, which will be equipped with state of the art equipment and computerized control systems, are state-of-the-art Fast Patrol Vessels for the Indian Coast Guard. They are based on an GSL's in-house design. These are the first class of ships of the Indian Coast Guard to be equipped with a controllable pitch propeller (CPP)-based propulsion system. The propulsion system includes two 3,000 kW (4,000 hp) diesel engines paired with two indigenously developed CPPs and gearboxes. The weapon systems include a 30mm CRN 91 naval gun and two 12.7 mm stabilised remote‑controlled machine guns. In order to enhance operational efficiency and automation, the ships will have an Integrated Bridge System, Integrated Platform Management System, and Automated Power Management System.

The primary roles of the vessel include fisheries protection and monitoring, patrol within India's exclusive economic zone, coastal patrol, anti-smuggling, anti piracy, and search and rescue operations. The vessels also have a secondary role of providing communication link and escorting convoys during hostilities and wartime.

The ships have indigenous content of over 60%.

== Construction history ==
=== 2022 ===
On 28 March 2022, the Indian Ministry of Defence awarded the contract for eight fast patrol vessels to the Goa Shipyard Limited. The cost of the project amounts to ₹473 crore (equivalent to ₹504 crore or US$52 million in 2026). Under the Buy (Indian-IDDM) Category, GSL designed, developed, and manufactured these surface platforms indigenously. As per the contract, the vessels needed to be delivered within 45 months of signing the contract.

=== 2023 ===
25 August 2023: Defence Secretary Shri Giridhar Aramane laid the keel of the first four of the fast patrol vessels for the Coast Guard.

The construction began circa 2023 on all the ships.

=== 2024 ===
28 August 2024: Goa Shipyard Limited laid the keel of the second four of the fast patrol vessels for the Coast Guard.

28 October: GSL launched first two ships simultaneously, named Adamya (256) and Akshar (257), utilising the state-of-art Ship Lift System.

=== 2025 ===
6 January 2025: The third and fourth ships, named Amulya (258) and Akshay (259), were launched.

16 June: The fifth ship of the class, Achal, was launched.

25 June: The maiden ship Adamya was inducted into active service.

29 July: The sixth ship of the class, Atal, was launched.

18 September: Akshar, the second ship was delivered the to Indian Coast Guard following the First Reading Ceremony and Handing Over Ceremony.

19 September: Adamya was commissioned at ICGS Paradip under the administrative and operational control of Commander, Coast Guard Region (North East), Kolkata, through Commander, Coast Guard District Headquarter 7 located at Paradip. The commissioning commander of the ship is Commandant Anurag Pandey.

4 October: Akshar was commissioned at ICGS Karaikal under the administrative and operational control of Commander, Coast Guard Region (East), Chennai, through Commander, Coast Guard District Headquarter 13 located at Puducherry. The commissioning commander of the ship is Commandant (JG) Subhendu Chakraborty.

24 October: The last of the two remaining ships, Ajit and Aparajit, were simultaneously launched by Smt. Manju Sharma, in the presence of Financial Advisor (Defence Services) Dr. Mayank Sharma, the Chief Guest. The event was also attended by Commander, ICG Region (West) Inspector General Bhisham Sharma along with senior officers from the ICG and Goa Shipyard Limited.

30 November: The third ship from the project, Amulya, was delivered to the Indian Coast Guard on 30 November 2025. The ship will be commissioned soon and will be based in Paradip alongside the lead ship Adamya.

19 December: Amulya was commissioned on 19 December 2025 in Goa. The commissioning ceremony was presided over by Joint Secretary (IC), Ceremonial & CAO Shri Amitabh Prasad, and attended by senior officials of ICG, Central and State Governments, and representatives from GSL. ICGS Amulya will be based at Paradip, Odisha, operating under the administrative and operational control of the Commander, Coast Guard Region (North East). The ship is commanded by Commandant (JG) Anupam Singh and has a complement of 05 officers and 34 personnel.

=== 2026 ===
31 March: Achal was delivered to the Indian Coast Guard on 31 March 2026.

9 May: Achal was commissioned into active service under the administrative and operational control of Commander, Coast Guard Region (North West), Gandhinagar.

27 June: Akshay was commissioned into Coast Guard fleet in Goa.

25 August: Ajit was delivered to the Coast Guard on 25 August 2026.

9 October: Ajit was commissioned into the service and will be based in Okha, Gujarat.

31 October: Aprajit was delivered to the Coast Guard.

== Ships in class ==
An Adamya class vessel was also donated to the Seychelles Coast Guard under the name PS Lespwar on 27 June 2026.

Name	Yard No.	Pennant	Keel Laid	Launched	Delivered	Commissioned	Home Port	Status
Indian Coast Guard
Adamya	1270	256	25 August 2023	28 October 2024	25 June 2025	19 September 2025	Paradip	Active
Akshar	1271	257	25 August 2023	28 October 2024	17 September 2025	4 October 2025	Karaikal	Active
Amulya	1272	258	25 August 2023	6 January 2025	30 November 2025	19 December 2025	Paradip	Active
Akshay	1273	259	25 August 2023	6 January 2025	29 May 2026	27 June 2026	Goa	Active
Achal	1274	260	28 August 2024	16 June 2025	31 March 2026	9 May 2026	Vadinar	Active
Atal	1275	261	28 August 2024	29 July 2025				Launched
Ajit	1277	262	28 August 2024	24 October 2025	25 August 2026	9 October 2026	Okha	Active
Aparajit	1278	263	28 August 2024	24 October 2025	31 October 2026			Delivered
Seychelles Coast Guard
Lespwar	—N/a	—N/a	—N/a	—N/a	27 June 2026	—N/a	—N/a	Active

== Gallery ==
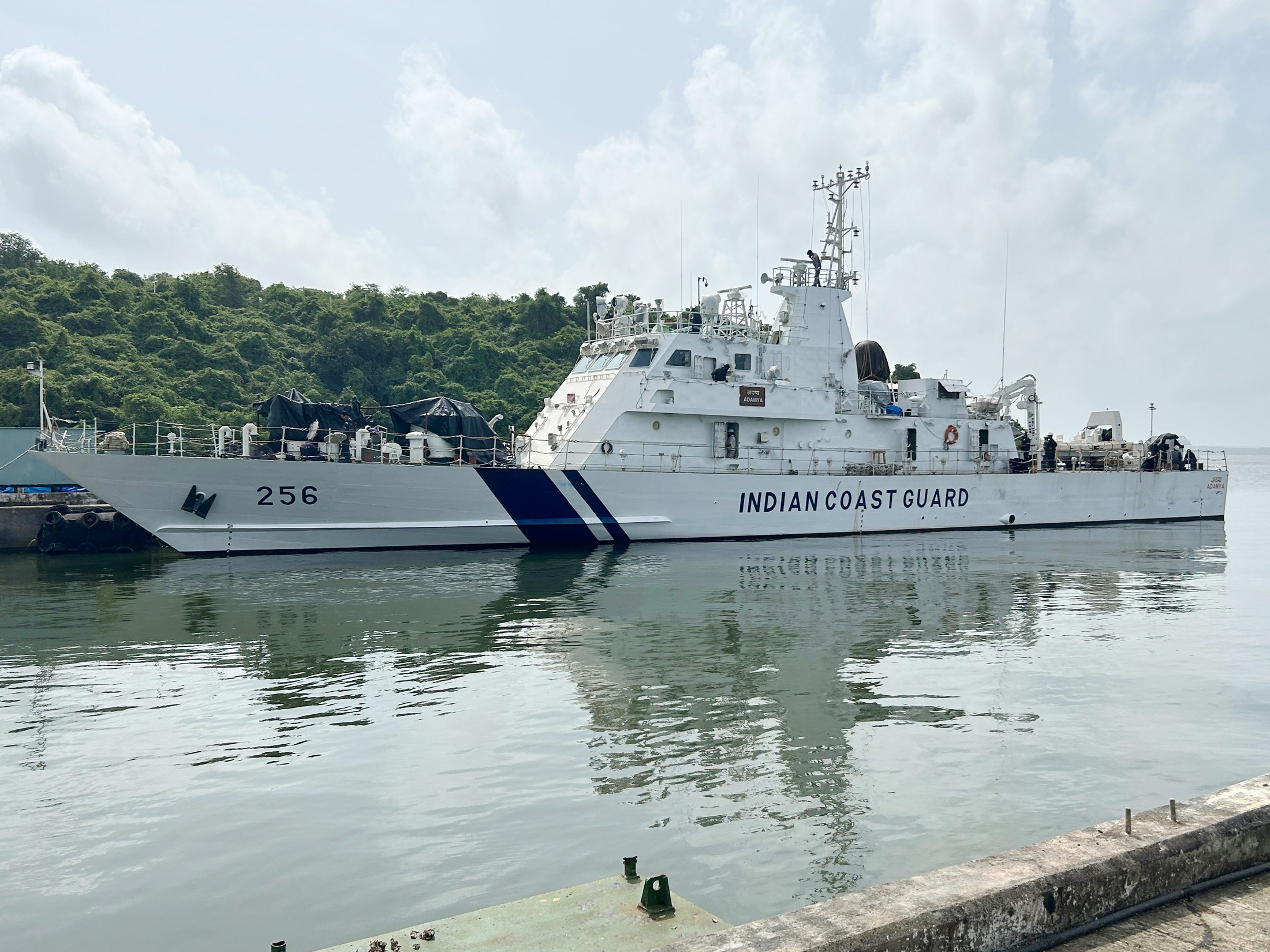
Adamya (256) during commissioning ceremony.

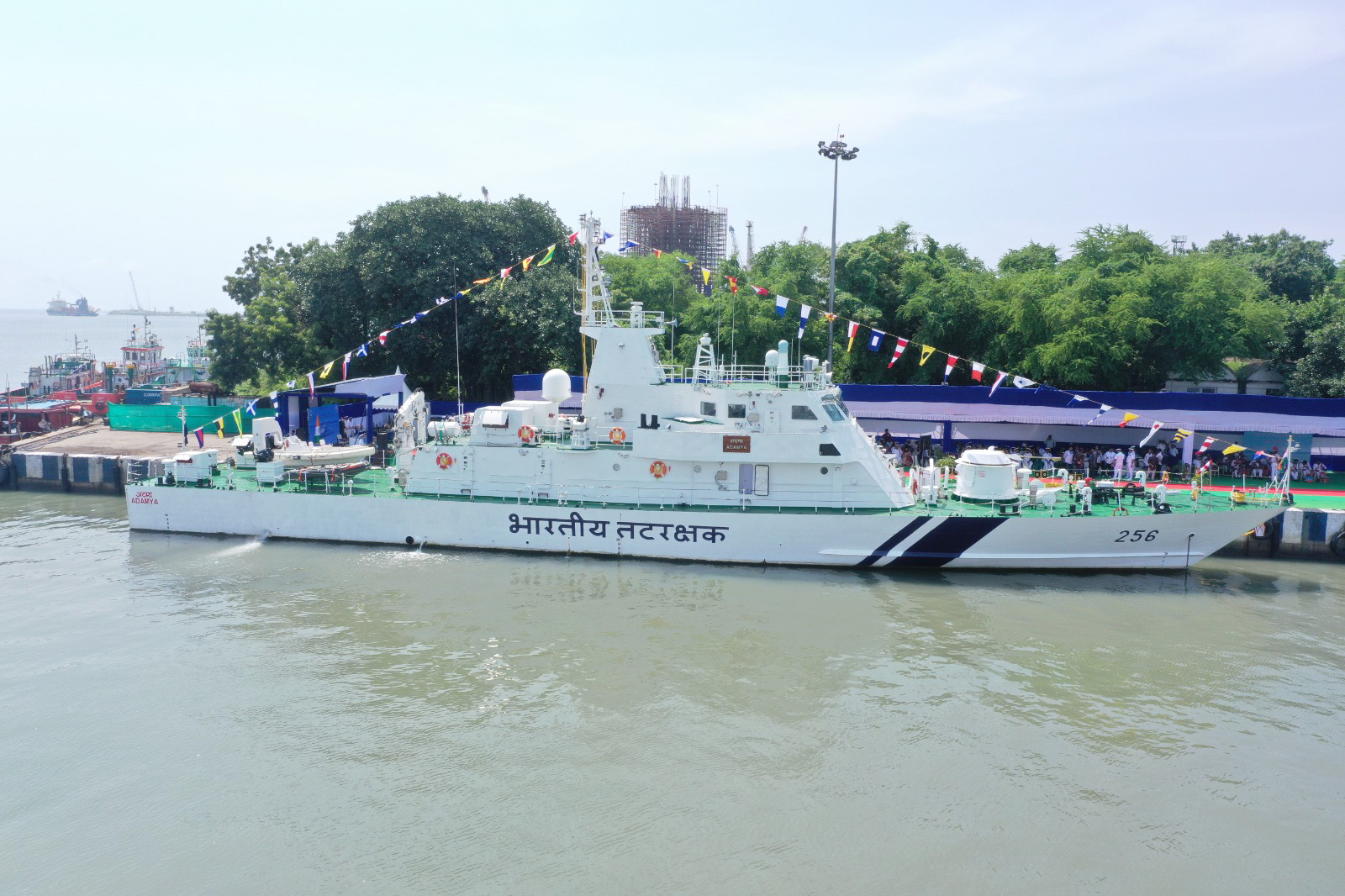
Adamya (256) during commissioning ceremony

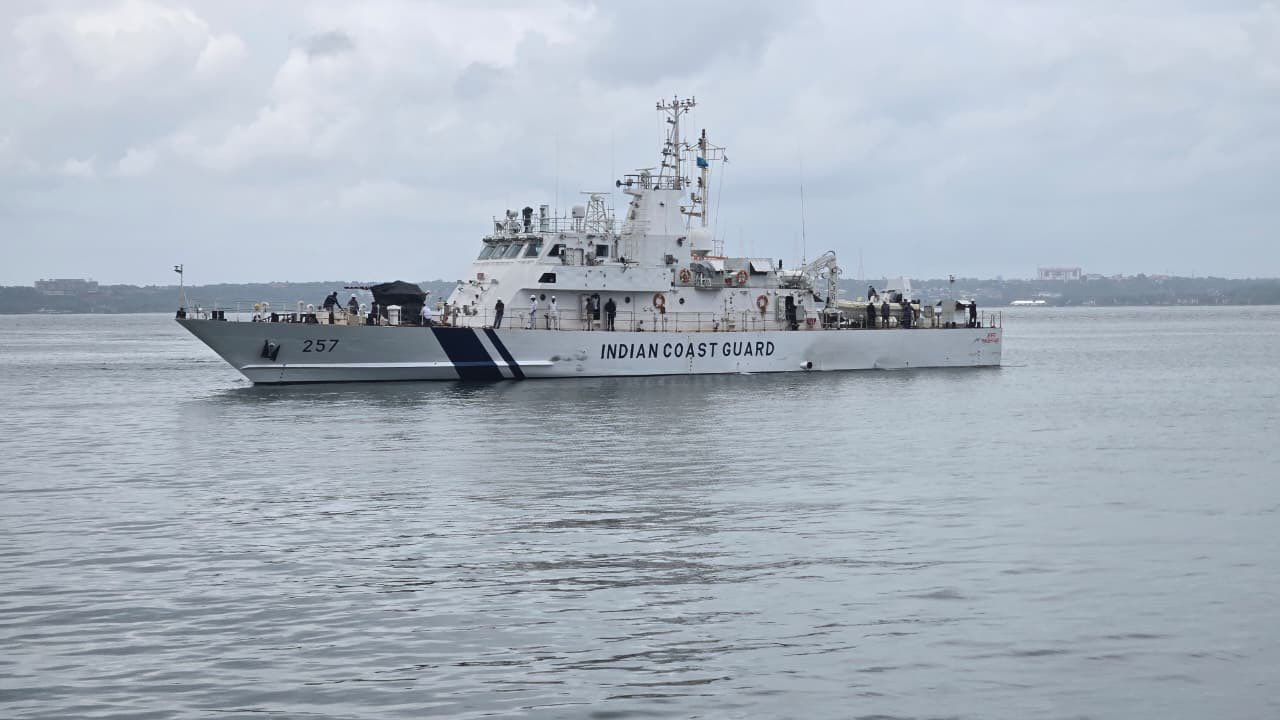
Akshar (257) during delivery to the Indian Coast Guard.

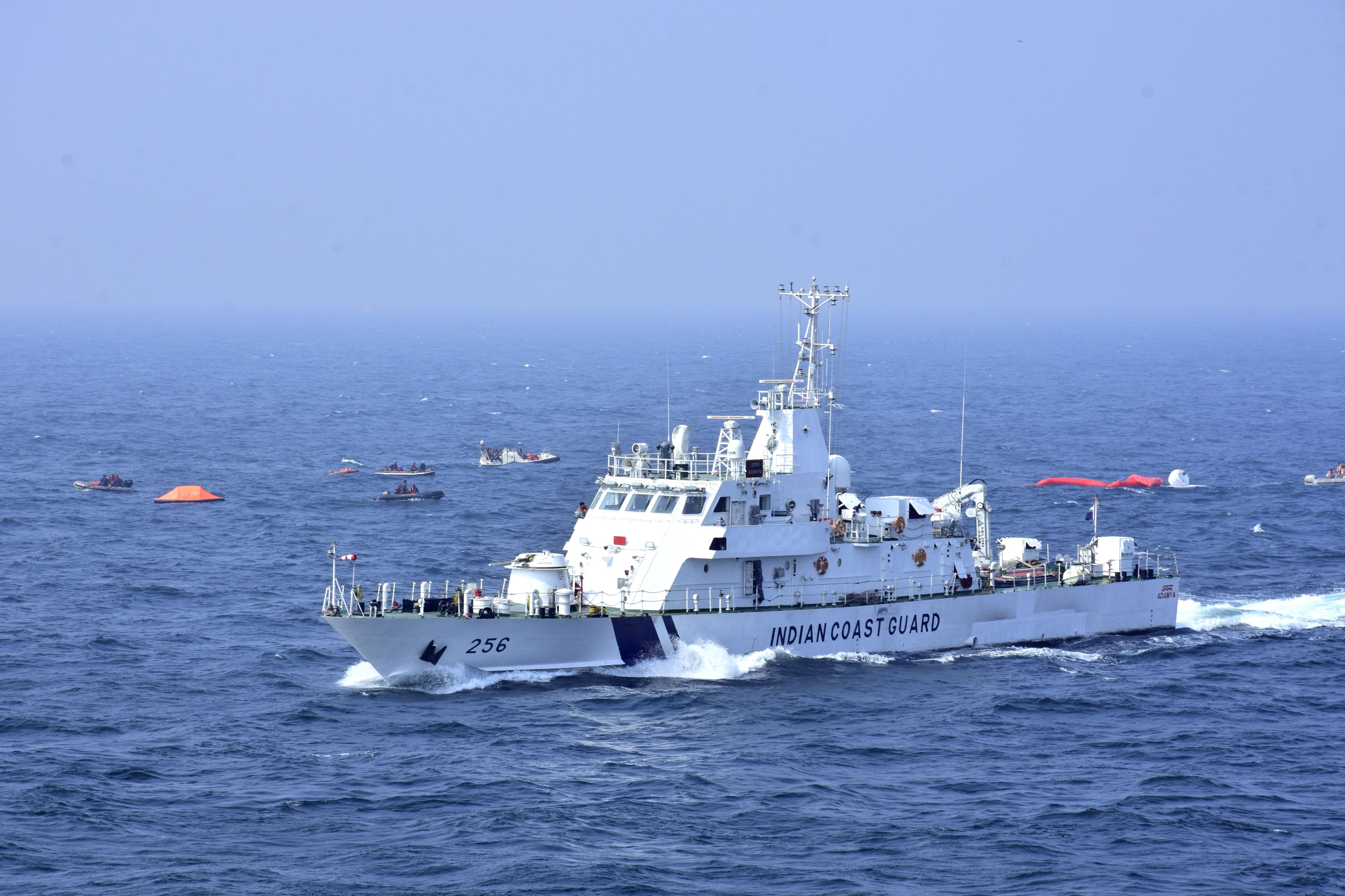
Adamya (256) on a patrol during search and rescue workshop and sea exercise ReSAREX-25.

== See also ==
- L&T-class fast interceptor craft
- Solas Marine fast interceptor boat
- ABG fast interceptor craft
- Car Nicobar-class patrol vessel
- Couach fast interceptor boats
- Rajshree-class patrol vessel
