= Pakistan Navy ranks and insignia =

The Pakistan Navy ranks and insignia are the military insignia used by the Pakistan Navy. They are used to identify their roles as commanding officers and varies with their responsibilities. As a former Dominion, Pakistan shares a rank structure similar to that of the Royal Navy.

== Officers ==
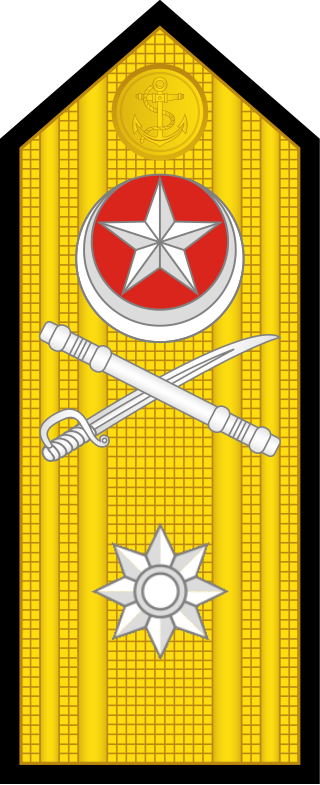
Rank group	General/flag officers				Senior officers			Junior officers
Pakistan Navy
Pakistan Navy	Admiral ایڈمرل	Vice admiral وائس ایڈمرل	Rear admiral بحریہ کا امیر	Commodore کموڈور	Captain کپتان	Commander کمانڈر	Lieutenant commander لیفٹیننٹ کمانڈر	Lieutenant لیفٹیننٹ	Sub-lieutenant سب لیفٹیننٹ	Midshipman مڈ شپ مین

== Chief petty officer & enlisted ==
Rank group	Junior commissioned officers			Non commissioned officer		Enlisted
Pakistan Navy							No insignia
Pakistan Navy	Master chief petty officer ماسٹر چیف پیٹی آفیسر	Fleet chief petty officer فلیٹ چیف پیٹی آفیسر	Chief petty officer چیف پیٹی آفیسر	Petty officer چھوٹا افسر	Leading seaman معروف سی مین	Able seaman قابل ملاح	Ordinary seaman عام سی مین

== See also ==
- List of serving generals of the Pakistan Army
- Pakistan Army ranks and insignia
- Pakistan Air Force ranks and insignia
