= Mahendra Nath Mulla =

Indian Navy officer

Captain Mahendra Nath Mulla MVC
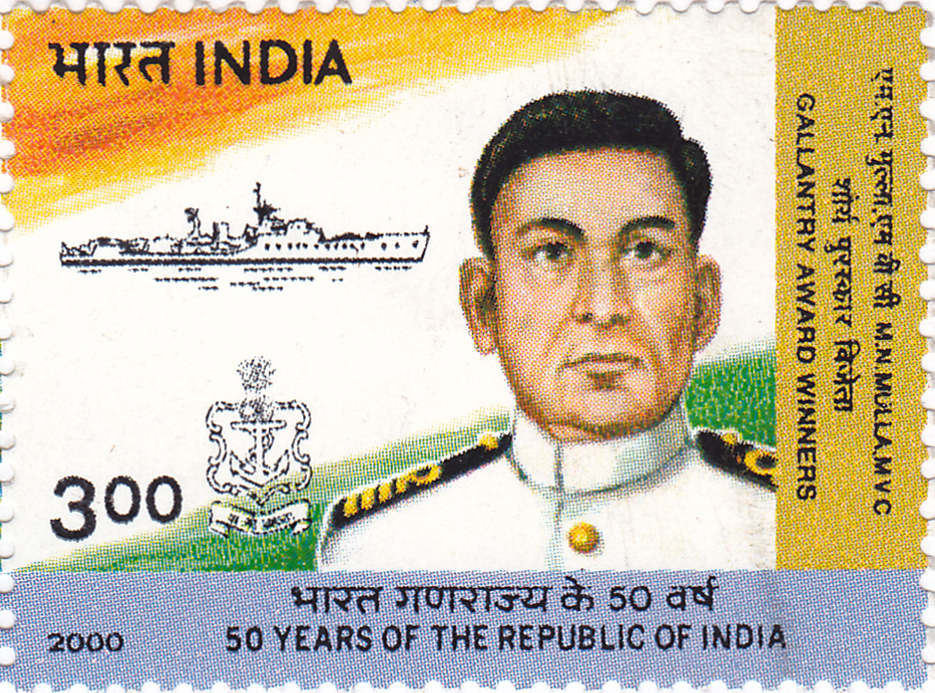
- Mulla on a 2000 stamp of India
- Born: 15 May 1926; Gorakhpur, United Provinces, British India (Present-day Uttar Pradesh, India)
- Died: 9 December 1971 (aged 45); Arabian Sea, near Diu, Dadra and Nagar Haveli and Daman and Diu, India
- Other name: M. N. Mulla
- Military career
- Allegiance: India
- Branch: Indian Navy
- Service years: 1948–1971
- Rank: Captain
- Commands: INS Khukri
- Conflicts: Indo-Pakistani War of 1971
- Awards: Maha Vir Chakra (posthumous)

Captain Mahendra Nath Mulla, MVC (15 May 1926 – 9 December 1971) was an Indian Navy officer. As the commanding officer of INS Khukri, he chose to go down with his ship, when it was sunk during the Indo-Pakistani War of 1971.

== Early life ==
Mulla was born on 15 May 1926 in a Kashmiri family in Gorakhpur, United Provinces to T. N. Mulla in a family well-known in Allahabad judicial circles. He joined the Royal Indian Navy as a cadet in January 1946 and underwent training in the United Kingdom.

== Military career ==
Mulla was commissioned in the Royal Indian Navy on 1 May 1948. He was promoted to lieutenant commander on 16 September 1958. In April 1961, he was selected to attend the Defence Services Staff College, Wellington. He was promoted to the rank of commander on 30 June 1964. He served on the Hunt-class destroyer INS Gomati (D93) and the Bathurst-class Minesweeper HMIS Madras (J237). He also served as the executive officer of the Black Swan-class sloop HMIS Kistna (U46) and commanded the R-class destroyer INS Rana (D115).

He served as the deputy naval adviser to the High Commissioner of India to the United Kingdom from 1965 to 1967.

== Indo-Pakistani War of 1971 ==
During the 1971 War, Mulla was commanding the 14th anti-submarine squadron, a task force that formed part of the Western Fleet. The squadron consisted of the INS Khukri (F149), INS Kirpan (F144) and INS Kuthar (F146). The squadron was assigned the task of hunting and destroying enemy submarines in the North Arabian Sea. At 2050 hours on 9 December 1971, his vessel, INS Khukri, was hit by a torpedo fired by an enemy submarine, PNS Hangor, about 64 kilometres (40 mi) off Diu. He issued orders for the ship to be abandoned because it was sinking. He chose to go down with the ship in the highest traditions of the Indian Navy. Mulla was decorated with the Maha Vir Chakra, the second-highest gallantry award.

The citation for the Maha Vir Chakra reads as follows:

Gazette Notification: 18 Pres/72,12-2-72

Operation: 1971 Date of Award: 09 Dec 1971

CITATION
CAPTAIN MAHENDRA NATH MULLA

Two ships of the Indian Navy under the command of Captain Mahendra Nath Mulla, Senior Officer of a Frigate Squadron were assigned the task of locating and destroying a Pakistan Submarine in the North Arabian Sea. During these operations on the night of 9 December 1971, in ship KHUKRI was hit by torpedoes fired by an enemy submarine and sank. Having decided to abandon the ship, Captain Mulla without regard for his safety supervised the arrangements for the rescue of his ship’s company in a very cool, calm, and methodical manner. Even at a later stage whilst the ship was sinking, Captain Mulla showed presence of mind and continued to direct rescue operations and refused to save himself by giving his own life saving gear to a sailor. Having directed as many of his men as possible to leave the ship, Captain Mulla went back to the bridge to see what further rescue operations could he performed. In doing so, Captain Mulla was last seen going down with his ship. His action and behaviour and the example he set, has been in keeping with the highest traditions of the service. Captain Mahendra Nath Mulla has displayed conspicuous gallantry and dedication.

== Legacy ==
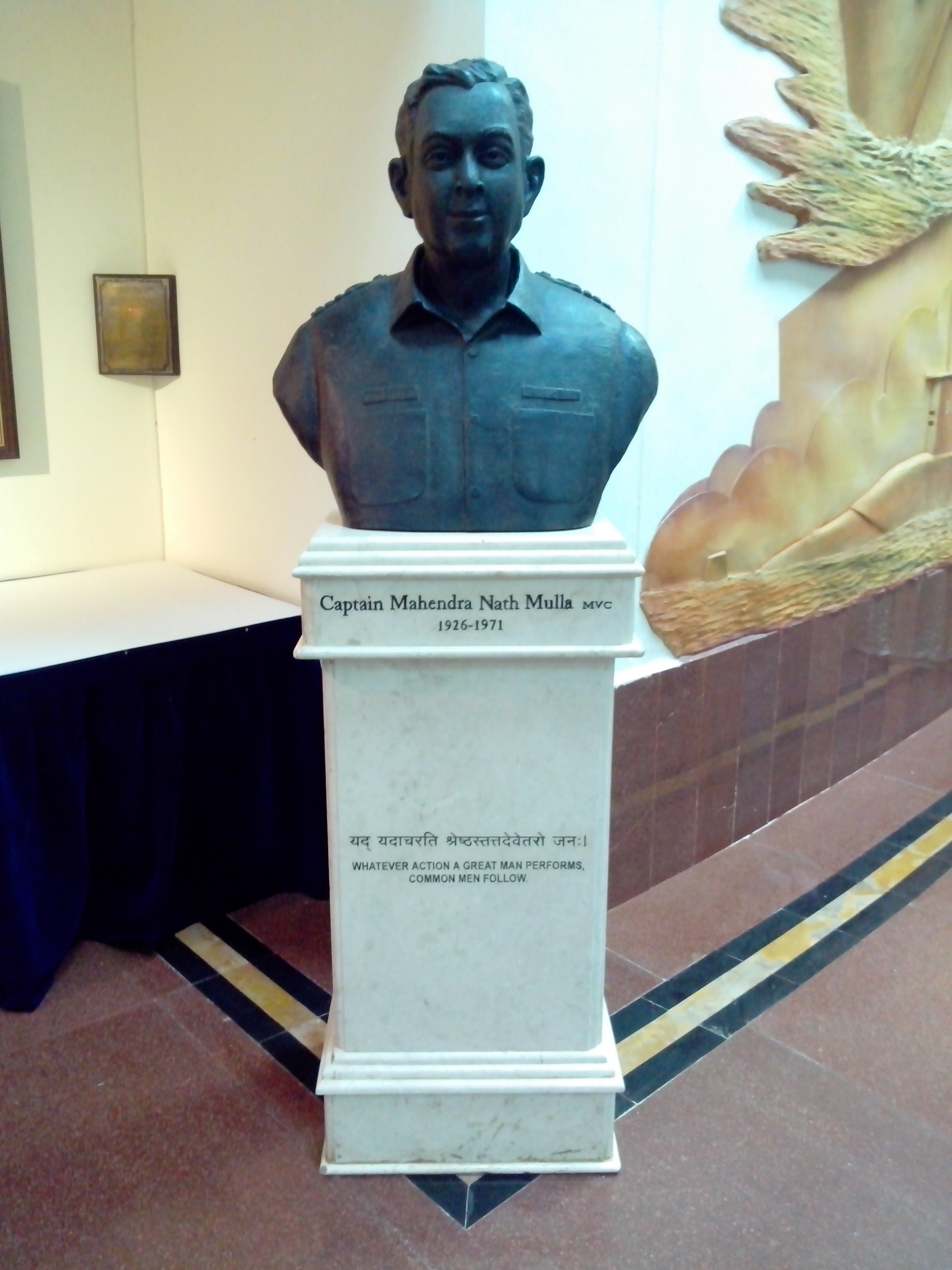
Bust of Mulla in Mumbai

Mulla was regarded among the finest seamen in the Navy and highly-intelligent officer. On 28 January 2000, the Prime Minister of India Atal Bihari Vajpayee released a commemorative postage stamp issued by India Post paying tribute to Mulla.

A memorial for the tribute to Mulla and other martyred sailors exists at Diu 20°42′10″N 70°58′37″E. The memorial constitutes a full-scale model of INS Khukri encased in a glass house, placed on a hillock facing the sea. The Captain M. N. Mulla Auditorium, at Navy Nagar, Colaba in Mumbai, is named after him. A bust of Capt. Mulla stands in the foyer. The then Chief of the Naval Staff Admiral Madhvendra Singh inaugurated the auditorium.

In Selection Centre South (SCS), Banglore, there is a hall named Capt.(IN) MN Mulla Hall after Capt. MN Mulla, MVC.

An auditorium at the DSSC Wellington is also named after him.

In the movie Border 2, Ahan Shetty portrayed Lt. Cdr. Mahendra Singh Rawat, a character based on the real-life Captain Mahendra Nath Mulla.
