= Pakistan Army ranks and insignia =

The Pakistan Army ranks and insignia encompass the military insignia utilized by the Pakistan Army. As a former Dominion, Pakistan adopts a rank structure similar to that of the British Army.

== Commissioned officer ranks ==
The rank insignia of commissioned officers in the Pakistan Army.

Rank group	General officers					Senior officers			Junior officers
Pakistan Army
Pakistan Army	Field marshal فیلڈ مارشل	General جنرل	Lieutenant general لیفٹیننٹ جنرل	Major general میجر جنرل	Brigadier بریگیڈیئر	Colonel کرنل	Lieutenant colonel لیفٹیننٹ کرنل	Major میجر	Captain کیپٹن	Lieutenant لیفٹنینٹ	Second lieutenant سیکنڈ لیفٹیننٹ

== Other ranks ==
Junior Commissioned Officers display their rank insignias on their shoulders, Non-Commissioned Officers showcase their rank insignias on mid sleeves, and in combat uniforms, all individuals wear rank insignias on their chest. The non-commissioned officer status begins with the rank of 'Lance Naik.' Company Quartermaster Havildar, Company Havildar Major, Battalion Quartermaster Havildar, and Battalion Havildar Major are company/battalion appointments held by senior Havildars. The ranks of Sowar, Daffadars, and Risaldars are utilized in the armoured corps.

Rank group	Junior commissioned officers			Non commissioned officers			Enlisted
Pakistan Army							No insignia
Pakistan Army	Subedar-major صوبیدار میجر	Subedar صوبیدار	Naib subedar نائب صوبیدار	Havildar حوالدار	Naik نائیک	Lance naik لانس نائیک	Sepoy سپاہی
Cavalry/Armoured ranks	Risaldar major رسالدار میجر	Risaldar رسالدار	Naib risaldar نائب رسالدار	Daffadar دفعدار	Lance daffadar لانس دفعدار	Acting lance daffadar قائم مقام لانس دفعدار	Sowar سوار

Appointment insignias of senior N.C.O.s (except the Armoured Corps)
Battalion havildar major	Battalion quartermaster havildar	Company havildar major	Company quartermaster havildar

== See also ==
- List of serving generals of the Pakistan Army
- Pakistan Navy ranks and insignia
- Pakistan Air Force ranks and insignia
