= INS Kalvari =

INS Kalvari may refer to:

- INS Kalvari (S23), an Indian Navy submarine that was in service from 1967 to 1996
- INS Kalvari (S21), an Indian Navy submarine that is in service since 2017
