= Ahan Shetty =

Indian actor (born 1995)

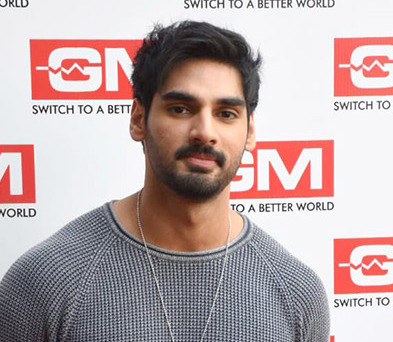
- Shetty in 2021
- Born: Ahan Shetty; 28 December 1995 (age 30); Bombay, Maharashtra, India
- Occupation: Actor
- Years active: 2021–present
- Parents: Sunil Shetty (father); Monisha Kadri (mother)
- Relatives: Athiya Shetty (sister); KL Rahul (brother-in-law)

Ahan Shetty (born 28 December 1995) is an Indian actor who works in Hindi films. The son of actor Suniel Shetty, he began his acting career with the action romance film Tadap (2021) which earned him the IIFA Award for Star Debut of the Year – Male. He has since had his highest-grossing release portraying Major Lt Cdr Mahendra Singh Rawat in the war film Border 2 (2026).

== Early life and family ==
Ahan Shetty was born on 28 December 1995 to Sunil Shetty and Mana Shetty in Bombay, (now Mumbai), India.

His elder sister is Athiya Shetty and mother, whose birth-name is Monisha Kadri, is a businesswoman, designer and social activist born to a Gujarati Muslim architect father and a Punjabi Hindu social activist mother.

== Career ==
Shetty began his acting career with Milan Luthria directional romantic action drama film Tadap (2021), co-starring Tara Sutaria, a remake of hit Telugu action film RX 100. To prepare for the role, he put on 11 kg and having 11 to 12 meals a day. The principal photography began in April 2019 under the Nadiadwala Grandson Entertainment banner with Fox Star Studios as distributor and co-producer. The film released in December 2021 theatrically with mixed reviews from critics. Monika Rawal Kukreja of Hindustan Times wrote, "Shetty and his character arch leaves a long impression, he makes an intense and impressive debut". While Devesh Sharma of Filmfare wrote, "He scores the most in action scenes [and] is at ease in front of the camera overall and makes a confident debut". Tadap grossed ₹34.86 crore at the box office. Shetty won the IIFA Award for Star Debut of the Year – Male for his performance.

Shetty with Sunny Deol, Anurag Singh and Varun Dhawan (l-r) promoting Border 2

With no release in five years, Shetty portrayed Lt Cdr Mahendra Singh Rawat, based on Captain Mahendra Nath Mulla, MVC, among an ensemble led by Sunny Deol in the action film Border 2 (2026), which is set amidst the India–Pakistan war of 1971. In a mixed review for Mid-Day, Athulya Nambiar noted that Shetty makes a sincere attempt as the Navy officer but struggles to stand out alongside stronger performers. A box office success, the film earned over ₹4.8 billion (US$50 million) to rank among the year's highest-grossing Indian film.

== Personal life ==
Shetty was in a relationship with fashion designer Tania Shroff. They were classmates in school.

== Filmography ==
Key
†	Denotes films that have not yet been released

=== Films ===
Year	Title	Role	Notes	Ref.
2021	Tadap	Ishana		
2026	Border 2	Lt Cdr M. S. Rawat		
TBA	Sanki †	TBA	Filming	
TBA	1920: Cold Winter †	TBA	Filming	

== Awards and nominations ==
Year	Award	Category	Work	Result	Ref
2022	International Indian Film Academy Awards	Star Debut of the Year – Male	Tadap	Won	
2022	Iconic Gold Awards	Best Debut Actor of the Year	Tadap	Won	
