= INS Kirpan =

The following ships of the Indian Navy have been named INS Kirpan:

- INS Kirpan (1959) was a Type 14 Blackwood-class frigate commissioned in 1959
- INS Kirpan (P44) is a Khukri-class corvette, currently in active service with the Indian Navy
