= PNS Hangor (S131) =

Pakistan Navy's Dephne-class submarine

Coordinates: 24.885040°N 67.090517°E

- Hangor on 4 December 1971

History

Pakistan
- Name: Hangor
- Namesake: Shark
- Ordered: 1966
- Builder: DCNS in France
- Launched: 28 June 1968
- Commissioned: 20 December 1970
- Decommissioned: 2 January 2006
- In service: 1970–2006
- Identification: S-131
- Honors and awards: 4× Sitara-e-Jurat; 6× Tamgha-i-Jurat; 14× Sword of Honour
- Status: Preserved at the Pakistan Naval Museum in Karachi
- Notes: First submarine to sink an enemy warship after World War II

General characteristics
- Class & type: Daphné-class submarine
- Length: 57.75 m (189 ft 6 in)
- Propulsion: Diesel-electric, two shafts, 1,600 shaft horsepower (1,193 kW)
- Speed: Snorkelling: 8 knots (15 km/h); Surfaced: 12 knots (22.2 km/h)
- Range: Surfaced: 10,000 nautical miles (20,000 km) at 7 knots (13 km/h)
- Endurance: 30 days
- Test depth: 300 m (980 ft)
- Complement: 53, 7 officers, 46 enlisted
- Sensors & processing systems: DRUA 31 radar; DUUA 2B sonar; DSUV 2 passive sonar; DUUX acoustic telemeter
- Electronic warfare & decoys: ARUR 10B radar detector
- Armament: 12 × 550 mm (22 in) torpedo tubes (8 bow, 4 stern); 12 torpedoes or missiles

PNS/M Hangor (S-131) (nicknamed: "Shark") is a Daphné-class diesel-electric submarine that served in the Pakistan Navy from 1969 until its decommissioning in 2006. It is the first submarine to sink a ship after World War II.

Hangor (S131) was the lead ship of her class, designed and constructed by France after a long and complicated negotiation which started in 1966. In 1969, Hangor was commissioned in the Submarine Command (SUBCOM) when she reported back to her home base in Karachi from Paris. Hangor, under the command of Commander Ahmed Tasnim, sank the Indian Navy's INS Khukri, an anti-submarine frigate, with one homing torpedo on 9 December 1971 during the western front of the third war with India in 1971.

This was the only recorded submarine kill after World War II until the Falklands War, when the Royal Navy's nuclear submarine HMS Conqueror sank the Argentine Navy cruiser General Belgrano. The strategic impact was even more significant as the Indian navy cancelled "Operation Triumph", the third missile attack, which was to be launched on 10 December.

== Acquisition and initial deployment ==
After the second war with Pakistan in 1965, the Indian Navy underwent a rapid modernization and expansion, causing the Pakistan Navy's focus to shift towards strengthening their existing Submarine Command due to being unable to acquire fighter jets from the Air Force. In 1966, the Ayub administration began the development and acquisition of the Daphné-class submarine from France. France renamed these submarines according to the Pakistan Navy's standards. Hangor was the lead ship of her class, which included Shushuk and Mangro, all commissioned in 1970.

Training of the crew took place in 1968. Notably, Hangor's officers that served in 1971 included:

- Commander Ahmed Tasnim, the commanding officer.
- Lieutenant-Commander A. U. Khan, second-in-command and the navigation officer
- Lieutenant-Commander R. A. Kadri, the electrical officer.
- Lieutenant Fasih Bokhari, the navigation officer.

The ship's first war-time deployment was in August 1971, gathering intelligence on the Indian Navy and clearing the Manora Island and Ormara Bay in the coastal areas of Pakistan. Hangor reported back to base in September 1971 but was again deployed in November 1971.

As Indian covert involvement in the East Pakistan grew, the Navy NHQ in Karachi deployed its only (albeit aging) long-range submarine, PNS Ghazi, under the command of Z.M. Khan, to pick up intelligence and track the aircraft carrier INS Vikrant off the Bay of Bengal in November 1971.

According to Rear-Admiral R. A. Kadri in 1999, the assigned mission was considered quite difficult and dangerous, with the submarine squadron sailing under the assumption that the dangerous nature of this mission meant a great mortal risk to the submarine and her crew.

== Service with Pakistan Navy ==
=== Western Front of Indo-Pakistani war of 1971 ===
On the midnight of 26 November 1971, Hangor sailed from its base with a load of torpedoes to patrol the Bombay Harbour. Soon after deployment, defects were noted in the ship's computers but were soon repaired as the patrol continued. Initially, there were two contacts that were picked up by the computers and were identified as warships, ranging 6 to 8 miles (9.7 to 12.9 km). The ship could not pursue its targets due to the warships' speed and the distance between them. Hangor's crew did, however, manage to predict the warships' movements.

At midnight of 2/3 December 1971, Hangor, remaining submerged in a northerly direction, investigated radio transmissions intercepted from the warships belonging to the Western Naval Command of the Indian Navy that would launch a first missile attack on Karachi. Hangor was passed over by the large Squadron of the Western fleet of the Indian Navy. The cruiser INS Mysore passed directly over the submarine.

All transmissions and computers were shut down to avoid the detection by the Indian fleet, and once passed over Cmdr. Tasnim broke the radio silence and communicated with the Navy NHQ to warn of the attack, but this message was intercepted. On 3 December 1971, the Indian Navy dispatched two ASW frigates, INS Khukri and INS Kirpan, under the command of Captain M. N. Mulla.

On 4 December 1971, Navy NHQ communicated with Hangor, giving her war codes to attack the Indian Navy's armada.

On 9/10 December 1971, at 19:00, Hangor detected the possible signature of the two Indian frigates dispatched in response to the intercepted communications. Later, around midnight, Cdr. Tasnim ordered Hangor to dive deep to carry out a blind (sonar only) approach as the torpedo team concentrated on tracking the two targets as they gradually came within firing range. It was then speculated that the torpedo had missed its target, and the moment Kirpan sensed the torpedo, the captain of Kirpan realized that the ship was under attack turned away at maximum speed from the scene. Hangor had struck first, but had failed to hit hard.

As Kirpan fled the battle, Khukri, to its south, knowing the direction from which the torpedo had come, increased speed and came straight for an attack on Hangor. As Khukri came in for an attack, Hangor's attack team shifted targeting to Khukri, quickly firing a second torpedo. The second torpedo was fired at the approaching Khukri and was followed by a heavy and loud explosion as the torpedo struck the magazine of Khukri. Shortly before the impact, Hangor detected the direct orders of Captain Mulla ordering evasive manoeuvres.

INS Kirpan moved into the scene, hoping to engage Hangor with a hasty dropping of the depth charge, but a third torpedo locked onto Kirpan's tail, followed by a loud explosion. Kirpan was not sunk but there was a substantial amount of physical damage that led Kirpan to flee the battle scene by turning west towards deep waters.

Hangor moved into searching for survivors in a hope to rescue but Khukri sank in matter of two minutes before Hangor could reach it. The casualty roster listed 18 officers and 176 sailors aboard Khukri and it remains as the Indian Navy's most costly wartime casualty in terms of lives lost. Kirpan returned to the scene next day to execute the rescue operation along with INS Katchal but left without success.

After this incident, there was a massive search and destroy mission led by the Western Fleet, indiscriminately dropping depth charges hoping to sink Hangor. Cdr. Tasnim had Hangor submerged for almost a week, returning to its base with depleted lead batteries during the night of 13 December 1971.

According to his personal admission in 2001, Tasnim maintained: "An extensive air search combined with surface ships made our life miserable but with the intelligent evasive action we managed to survive these attacks and arrived in Karachi safely after the ceasefire."

== Legacy ==
=== Decommissioning and preservation ===
Over the successive years, it served in the Navy with distinction until decommissioning in 2006. In a ceremony on 2 January 2006, Hangor was decommissioned from the Pakistan Navy; it was soon converted to serve as a museum ship at Pakistan Maritime Museum.

In its memory, Pakistan remembers and celebrates 9 December as Hangor Day.

=== Honors and awards ===
In recognition of her service, Hangor was decorated with multiple gallantry and wartime awards and honors. She is regarded in the Navy as having the highest number of operational gallantry awards given to a single warship of Pakistan Navy.

4×Sitara-e-Jurat

6×Tamgha-i-Jurat

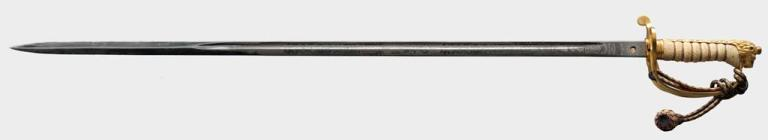
14×Sword of Honour

== In popular culture ==
Hangor has been featured in a number of Pakistani dramas and films. An example of this is the film Hangor S-131. It is featured in the 2026 Indian film Border 2 which is based on different theatres of the Indo-Pakistani war of 1971; Shahid Latif portrays Hangor captain Ahmad Tasnim while Mahendra Nath Mulla, captain of INS Khukri, is portrayed by Ahan Shetty.

== See also ==
- Timeline of the Bangladesh Liberation War
- Mitro Bahini order of battle
- Pakistan Army order of battle, December 1971
- Evolution of Pakistan Eastern Command plan
- Operation Searchlight
- Indo-Pakistani wars and conflicts
- Operation Dwarka
