= INS Khukri (F149) =

Indian blackwood-class frigate sunk by Pakistan

Coordinates: 20°16′38″N 70°59′37″E

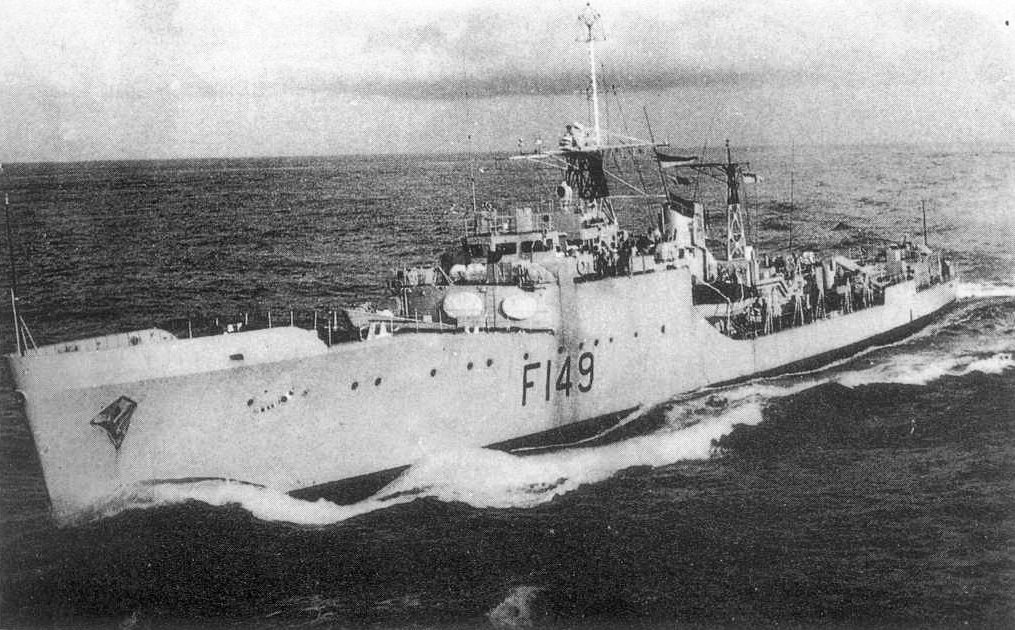
- INS Khukrii underway

History

India
- Name: INS Khukri
- Namesake: Khukri
- Builder: J. Samuel White, Cowes
- Laid down: 29 December 1955
- Launched: 20 November 1956
- Commissioned: 16 July 1958
- Identification: Pennant number: F149
- Fate: Torpedoed and sunk on 9 December 1971

General characteristics
- Class & type: Blackwood-class frigate
- Displacement: 1,180 long tons (1,199 t) full load
- Length: 300 ft (91 m)pp 310 ft (94 m)oa
- Beam: 33 ft (10 m)
- Draught: 15.5 ft (4.7 m)
- Propulsion: Y-100 plant; 2 x Babcock & Wilcox boilers, steam turbines on 1 shaft, 15,000 shp (11 MW)
- Speed: 27.8 knots (51 km/h) maximum, 24.5 knots (45 km/h) sustained
- Range: 5,200 nautical miles (9,630 km) at 12 knots (22 km/h)
- Complement: 150
- Sensors & processing systems: Radar Type 974 navigation; Sonar Type 174 search; Sonar Type 162 target classification; Sonar Type 170 targeting
- Armament: 3 × 40 mm Bofors gun Mark 7 (quarterdeck mount later removed); 2 × Limbo Mark 10 A/S mortars

INS Khukri was a Type 14 (Blackwood-class) frigate of the Indian Navy. She was a part of the 14th Frigate Squadron, a task force that formed part of the Western Fleet. The squadron consisted of the three frigates – INS Khukri, INS Kirpan and INS Kuthar. She was sunk off the coast of Diu, Gujarat, India by the Pakistan Navy Daphné-class submarine Hangor on 9 December 1971 during the Indo-Pakistani War of 1971. She was the first warship sunk by a submarine since World War II and is the post-independence Indian Navy's only warship to have been lost in war.

== The sinking of INS Khukri ==
After the beginning of hostilities on 3 December 1971, Indian Naval radio detection identified a submarine lurking about 35 miles (56 km) southwest of Diu harbour. The 14th Frigate Squadron of the Western Fleet was dispatched to destroy the submarine. It usually consisted of five ships, Khukri, Kirpan, Kalveti, Krishna and Kuthar, but at the time of the incident Kuthar's boiler room was being repaired in Bombay. One reason that may have prompted the decision to deploy two obsolete Blackwood-class frigates against a modern Daphne-class submarine was that the Indian Navy lacked sufficient numbers of anti-submarine aircraft.

The submarine sighted the squadron on the evening of 9 December. Khukri was still not aware of the submarine's presence and continued slowly on a steady course because she was testing an improved version of the 170/174 sonar, which required a low speed to increase detection, despite the fact that moving on low speed was against Indian anti-submarine doctrine.

At 19:57 Hangor fired a homing torpedo on a sonar approach at Kirpan. The torpedo missed Kirpan, did not explode, and was detected, causing Kirpan to turn away and fire multiple anti-submarine mortars, all of which also missed. Khukri increased its speed and turned towards the submarine, which then fired a second torpedo directed at Khukri. The torpedo struck Khukri and exploded under its oil tanks. According to the Pakistani submarine captain, Commander Ahmed Tasnim, the ship sank within two minutes. Other sources claim that Khukri was struck by three torpedoes before going down.

After a few minutes, Kirpan attacked Hangor with depth charges, as her anti-submarine mortars were no longer functional. All missed. Hangor then fired a final torpedo at Kirpan, which Kirpan dodged before returning back. Hangor then left the area. Hangor patrolled the region for the next four days before returning safely to her berth.

== Casualties ==
Khukri is the only ship lost in combat in the history of the post-independence Indian Navy. Eighteen officers and 176 sailors were killed. The captain, Mahendra Nath Mulla, was among the casualties and is therefore the only Indian captain to go down with a vessel. He was posthumously awarded India's second-highest military honour, the Maha Vir Chakra.

== Remembrance ==
A memorial in the remembrance of this ship has been built, along the coast, in Diu. The memorial consists of a scale model of Khukri encased in a glass house, placed atop a hillock facing the sea. The memorial was inaugurated by Vice Admiral Madhvendra Singh as the flag officer commanding-in-chief. India's first indigenously built corvette was also named after her.

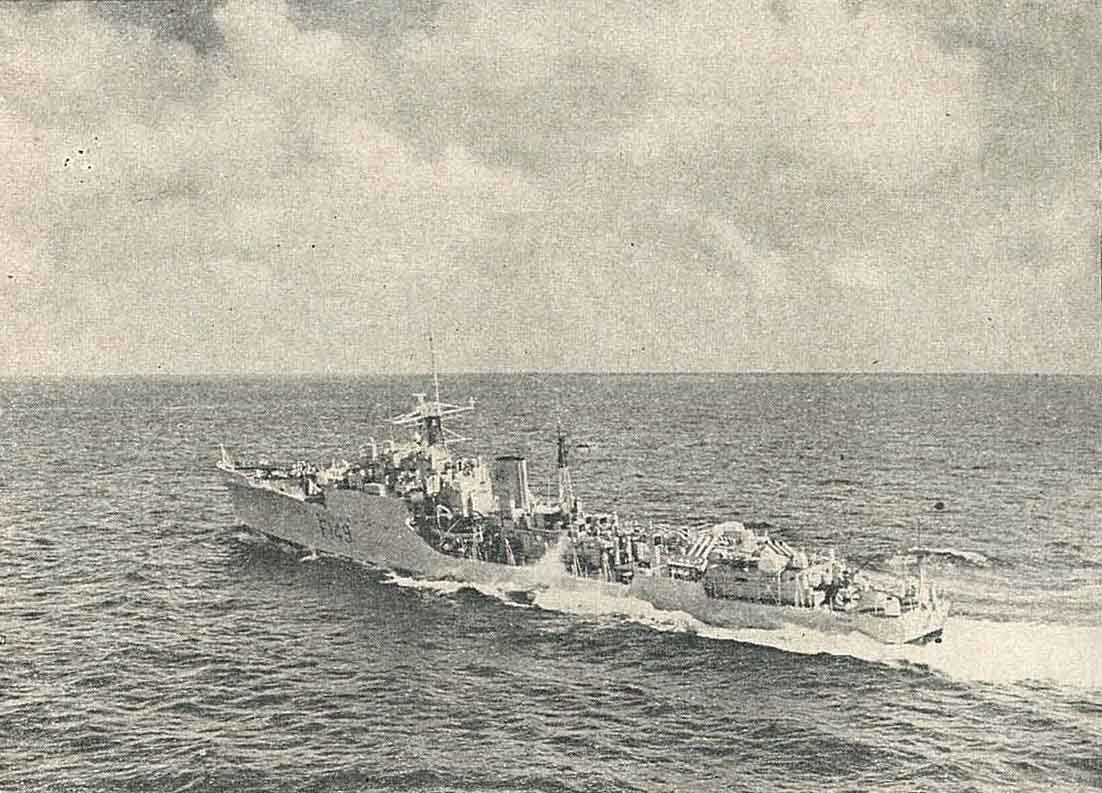
INS Khukri during an exercise with Indonesian Navy in 1960

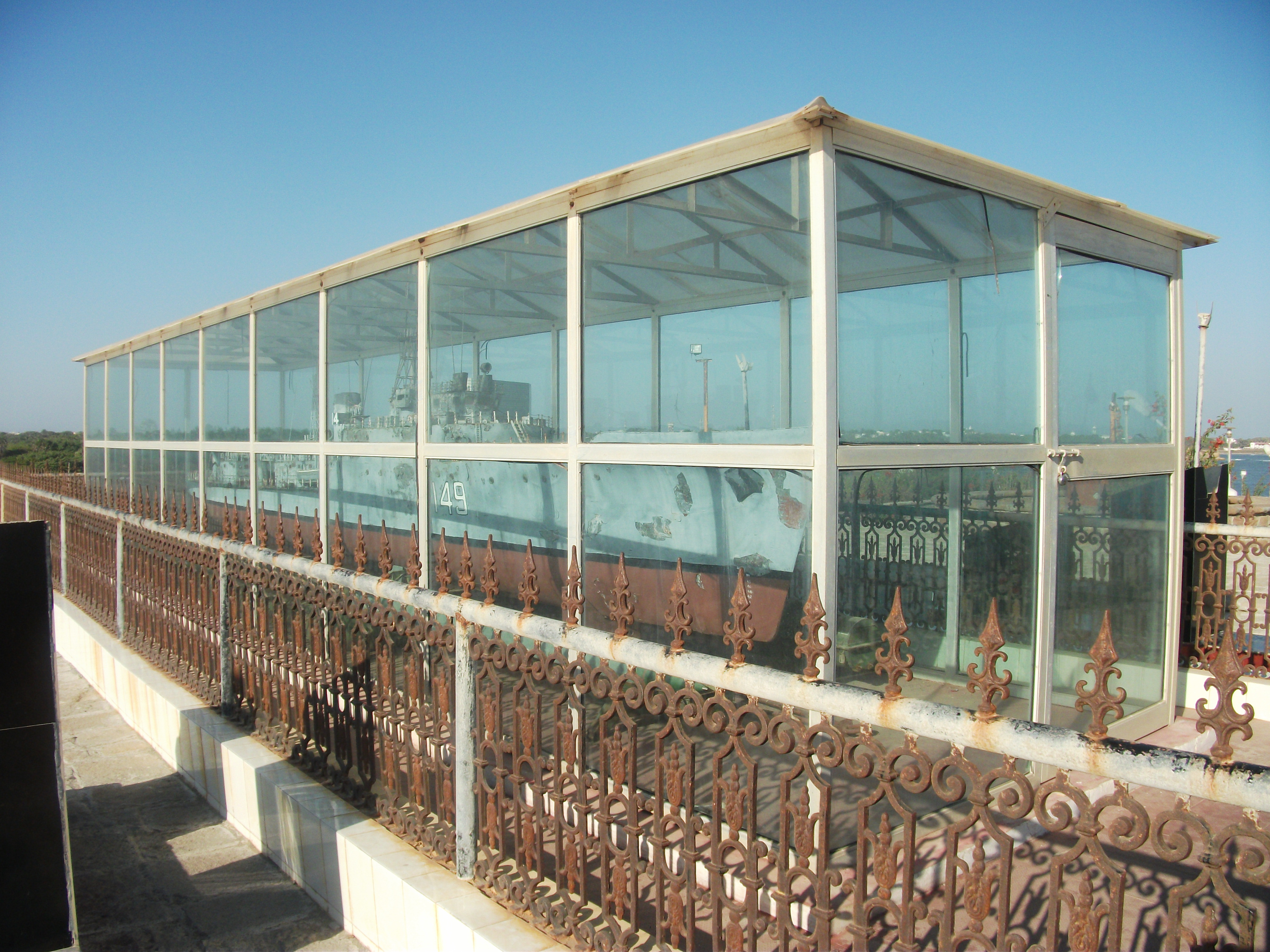
Model of Khukri at the INS Khukri memorial, Diu

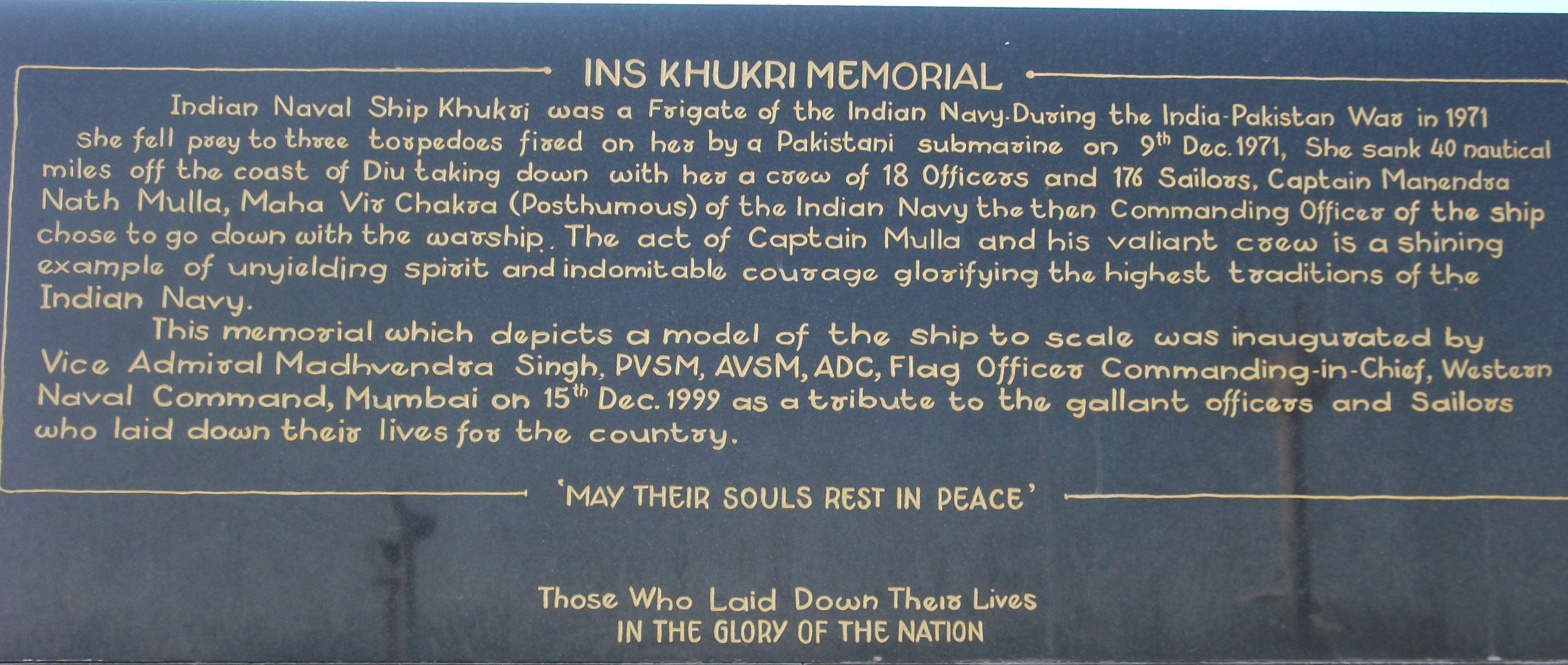
INS Khukri memorial, Diu

== Controversy ==
Responsibility for errors by Indian naval officers related to the sinking has caused some controversy. The naval officer who led the inquiry into the sinking, Benoy Bhushan, has claimed that India's official naval history invented fictional accounts to cover up bungling and a surviving sailor from the frigate, Chanchal Singh Gill, has called for an investigation and withdrawal of gallantry awards to negligent officers in the squadron.

== See also ==
- HMS Cadiz (D79)
- Indo-Pakistani War of 1971
- Timeline of the Bangladesh Liberation War
- Military plans of the Bangladesh Liberation War
- Mitro Bahini order of battle
- Pakistan Army order of battle, December 1971
- Evolution of Pakistan Eastern Command plan
- Indo-Pakistani wars and conflicts
- Military history of India
- List of military disasters
- List of wars involving India
- Sinking of ARA General Belgrano
- Sinking of IRIS Dena
