= Rahul Singh (actor) =

Indian actor, writer (born 1976)

- Born: 18 October 1976 (age 50); Udaipur, Rajasthan, India
- Citizenship: India
- Education: Mayo College, Ajmer St. Xavier's College, Mumbai RADA, London
- Occupations: Actor; Playwright; Screenwriter
- Years active: 1998–present
- Known for: Khiladi 786; Delhi Belly
- Spouse: Vartika Singh
- Mother: Prabha Thakur
- Website: Rahul Singh on Instagram

Rahul Singh is an Indian actor, playwright and screenwriter. He is known for his work in movies including Zubeidaa (2001), Khiladi 786 (2012), Kaante (2002), Stanley ka Dabba (2011), The Ghazi Attack (2017), Delhi Belly (2011) and serials like 24: India (2014). He has played a diverse range of characters and acted in Bollywood-Hindi as well as Punjabi and Telugu films.

== Personal life and background ==
He is the son of Prabha Thakur, poet and a member of Rajya Sabha. His forefathers played a prominent role in the Freedom struggle. Singh attended school at Mayo College in Ajmer and graduated from St. Xavier's College. In early years, he aspired to become a sportsman or work as a cop. While in college, he wrote more than 50 street plays and was part of an acting group that performed for various social organizations. Singh studied acting overseas at the Royal Academy of Drama and the British Film Institute in London.

Singh acknowledged that his mother's poetry influenced him as a writer, both genetically and through the inspiration it provides, also expressing the enjoyment of scriptwriting and its connection to his previous experience in street theatre. He considers Madhur Bhandarkar as his mentor and friend along with Akshay Kumar and Judy Dench.

Rahul stated that he believes in slowly and steadily building his career, and his acting skills have been appreciated, leading to more offers. Singh values versatility and chooses roles based on their script and his character's importance. He is open to playing different types of roles whether as antagonist or doing comedy given that it should justify his "love for acting". He states, "So even while I sign a big budget film like a Khiladi 786 or a limited-budget film like Tere Bin Laden, I listen to the narration and read the script of the film. My role and my lines are important to me."

Singh has been actively involved in environmental conservation campaigns and has previously worked with organizations for elephant conservation in West Bengal. In 2020, he joined the campaign to remove invasive plant species called Lantana, which was causing habitat loss for wildlife at the Sajjangarh Wildlife Sanctuary in Udaipur.

== Career ==
=== Film & television ===
In 2001, Singh made a strong debut in the film Zubeidaa winning him nomination for the best actor award. In 2006, Singh was seen in the starring role as in Randhir Singh in Kachchi Sadak. The story is part fiction part reality, penned by Rahul Singh himself. The story follows a boy named who grows up on the streets after his mother's failed marriage. He becomes involved in the liquor trade and gains enemies. Later, he is asked to help a politician in the elections against a liquor baron, but destiny has different plans for him. The film was incidentally the last acting role of veteran actor Amrish Puri.

In 2009, he appeared in Madhur Bhandarkar's Jail in the role of a prisoner awaiting trial for murder, a character Bhandarkar wrote keeping Singh in mind. The positive response to the film helped him garner other major projects. Reflecting on his role, he stated, "Looking back at my career so far, I can say that though Zubeidaa won me nomination as the best actor and my best performance as an actor was in Kachchi Sadak, with Jail, the truth of my performance has gone up by many more degrees." He was seen in the role of radio jockey and voice over artiste Qureshi in Tere Bin Laden (2010) and its 2016 sequel.

Singh played the lead role of Brij Bhushan Singh in the TV serial Sapno Ke Bhanwar Mein. As a recurring cast member in 1st season of 24: India, he played the character Vikrant Maharia. In 2012, he was chosen by Akshay Kumar to play the main antagonist Azad Reddy in Khildai 786. He portrays an extremely colorful antagonist whose character undergoes a transformation from being funny to ironical to serious to tragically comic and ultimately becomes an action-oriented figure. He appeared in Chandraprakash Dwivedi's movie Zed Plus (2014) playing the title role of a commando, and in John Abraham produced film, 'Satra Ko Shaadi Hai'.

Rahul Singh received praise for his performance in the role of Pakistani naval commander Razaq Moh'd. Khan in the 2017 film The Ghazi Attack. For this role, he spent a week with the Indian Navy to familiarize himself with the marine environment. The actor also received praise from various individuals, including army and navy officers.

Despite losing 18 kg due to health issues, he continued playing the role of Aurangzeb in 2017 series Peshwa Bajirao. Despite the pain, Rahul stated he believes in the saying "the show must go on" and didn't want to say no to work. He mentioned that losing weight actually helped him portray the aged character of Aurangzeb.

In 2021, Rahul joined the cast of the Ullu web series A Crime To Remember in the role of the investigator, a show inspired by a high-profile murder investigation. In 2023, he was cast in the Hindi fantasy drama series Fireflies: Parth Aur Jugnu.

=== Writer ===
Singh is known for writing screenplays and dialogues including Sanjay Dutt starrer Kaante (2002) and Kachchi Sadak (2006). In addition, he writes and improvises his scenes in movies stating, "I improvise a lot of dialogues and scenes with the director's permission. Most of my dialogues are my improvisations."

In 2014, he wrote the dialogues for two movies directed by Nila Madhab Panda.

=== Theatre ===
Singh has written and acted in stage plays for the 'Jagrut' theatre group, which he founded. He has directed and acted in nearly fifty stage plays fostering awareness for rising social issues.

He has also performed in cultural festivals including Mood Indigo, and Malhar. Rahul has performed in The Shawl by David Mamet, Hamlet and The Merchant of Venice by Shakespeare, and The Black Cat by Edgar Allan Poe, among others. He has also performed in several classical and modern plays for the English theatre and Hindi theatre in the Oval House Theatre.

== Filmography ==
=== Writing credits ===
Year	Film	Dialogues	Screenplay	Notes
2002	Kaante	Yes	No	
2007	Rani	Yes	No	Shelved film
2006	Kachchi Sadak	No	Yes	

=== Acting Credits ===
==== Films ====
Year	Film	Role	Notes
1998	Dushman	Taxi Driver	
1998	Ghulam	Assistant officer #3	
1999	Baadshah	Chai Person	
2001	Zubeidaa	Uday Singh	
2001	Bas Itna Sa Khwaab Hai	Yashwant Rane	
2003	Darna Mana Hai	Dev Bohra	
2004	Kyun! Ho Gaya Na...	Banna Dabas	
2005	Netaji Subhas Chandra Bose: The Forgotten Hero	Mohd Zaman Kiani (Chief of INA)	
2006	Kachchi Sadak	Randhir Singh Chaudhry	
2007	Kya Love Story Hai	Chiku: Arjun's friend	
2008	Firaaq	Rajat	
2009	Well Done Abba	Rohan Kapoor	
2009	Jail	Abdul Gani	
2010	Tere Bin Laden	Qureishi Ahmed	
2011	Chalo Dilli	Bhairon Singh Gurjar	
2011	Delhi Belly	Rajeev Khanna	
2011	Stanley Ka Dabba	School Principal	
2011	Hum Tum Shabana	Ravi Aggarwal	
2011	Chitkabrey	Jayan Mangatram Patel	
2012	Chaar Din Ki Chandni	Lt. Shaitan Singh	
2012	Jalpari: The Desert Mermaid	Veera Boxer	
2012	Khiladi 786	Azad Reddy	
2012	Rush	Cujo	
2013	Jayanta Bhai Ki Luv Story	Dutta Bhai	
2013	Jal	Kisna Prasad	
2014	Zed Plus	Inspector Rajesh	
2015	Satra Ko Shaadi Hai	Corporate honcho	
2016	Saadey CM Saab	Inder	Punjabi film
2016	Tere Bin Laden: Dead or Alive	Radio Jockey/Voiceover artiste Qureshi	
2017	The Ghazi Attack	Commander Razaq Moh'd. Khan	
2017	Dragon	Surya	
2017	Rogue		Bilingual film
2018	Side A & Side B	Rajan	
2018	Gauru: Journey of Courage	Jaisal Dhadvi	
2021	Dhananjay		
2021	Wild Dog	Nawaz	Telugu film
2022	36 Farmhouse	Gajendra Singh	
2022	Thar	Hanif Khan	

==== Television ====
Year	Series	Role	Notes
1998	Captain Vyom	Chandrakant "Chandu" Shastri	
2013	24	Vikrant Maharia	
2013	Samvidhaan: The Making of the Constitution of India	Acharya Kriplani	
2013	Sapno Ke Bhanwar Me	Brij Bhushan Singh - Politician (Main Lead - Antagonist)	
2016-2017	Peshwa Bajirao	Aurangzeb	
2018	Chandrashekhar	Ram Prasad Bismil	
2019–2020	Meri Gudiya	Dr. Rudraksh Kaushal	
2020	Damaged 2	Deshraj Duggal	
2021	Naam Ghum Jayega		
2023	Fireflies: Parth Aur Jugnu	Hooda Sir	
2025	Mandala Murders	Jairaj	
