= PNS Ghazi (S134) =

Pakistan Navy diesel-electric submarine

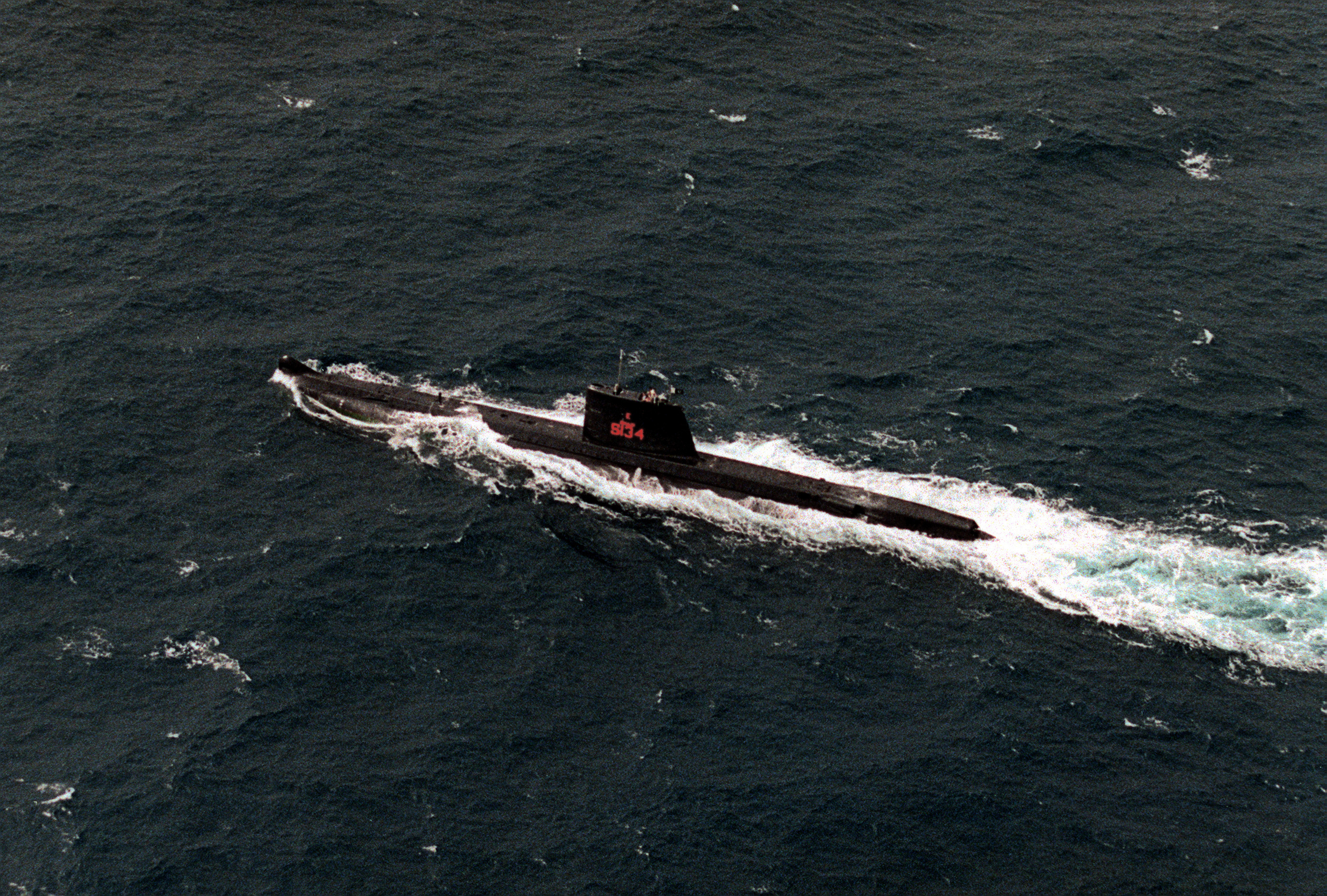
- PNS Ghazi (S-134), an Albacora-class submarine, patrolling off the Arabian Sea in 1991.

History

Pakistan
- Name: Ghazi
- Namesake: PNS Ghazi (In memorial)
- Builder: DCNS in France; Dubigeòn-Normándie in Portugal
- Launched: 16 February 1968
- Acquired: 1975
- Commissioned: 17 January 1977
- Decommissioned: 17 January 2006
- Identification: S-134
- Fate: Scrapped by National Shipping Corporation

General characteristics
- Class & type: Daphné-class submarine; Albacora-class submarine; Hangor-class submarine (After refit)
- Displacement: 860 tons surfaced; 1,043 tons submerged
- Length: 57.8 m (189.6 ft)
- Beam: 6.8 m (22.3 ft)
- Draught: 5.2 m (17.1 ft)
- Propulsion: Diesel-electric, two shafts, 2,450Cv/Hp; 2 × Pielstick (12 PA4 185); 2 × AREVA electric alternate
- Speed: Submerged: 16 knots (30 km/h); Surfaced: 13.5 knots (25.0 km/h)
- Range: Surfaced: 2,700 nmi (5,000 km) at 12 knots (22 km/h)
- Complement: 54, 10 Officers, 44 Enlists (Pakistan service)
- Armament: 12 × 21.7 in (551 mm) DaphneTT-550 torpedo tubes (8 bow, 4 stern), 12 torpedoes

PNS/M Ghazi (S-134), formerly known as NRP Cachalote (S165), was a diesel-electric submarine that served in the Pakistan Navy from 1975 until decommissioned in 2006. Based on the French Daphné-class design, she was built in Portugal with French assistance as a member of the Albacora class and had served in the Portuguese Navy before being purchased by Pakistan in 1977. In the service with Pakistan Navy, she was the only ship of her Albacora class in the Submarine Command.

Originally named NRP Cachalote (S165), she was procured and transferred quickly to the Pakistan Navy by the Portuguese Navy after learning the news of Portuguese selling the submarine to private sector in December 1975.

After being sent to Toulon in France for a refit according to Pakistan Navy's specifications and standards, she was commissioned in 1977 and was renamed as Ghazi in memory of PNS Ghazi, the Tench-class submarine built in the United States in 1944. In 1991–95, she participated in the naval operations during the Somali Civil War.

In 1997–98, she was the film site of the Ghazi Shaheed, a telefilm released in 1998.

On 2 January 2006, she was decommissioned from her military service, completing 34-years of service with the Pakistan Navy.

== See also ==
- Hangor-class submarine (1968)
