= PNS Zafar =

The PNS Zafar, or Naval Base Zafar is a naval base located in the vicinity of the Navy NHQ in Islamabad, Pakistan. Commissioned in 1974, it serves as a headquarter of the Northern Command of the Pakistan Navy.

The PNS Zafar is a namesake of Commander Zafar Mohammad, the commanding officer of the PNS Ghazi in 1971, and is a logistics depot all Pakistan Navy personnel stationed at Islamabad.
