= Sankalp Reddy =

Indian film director

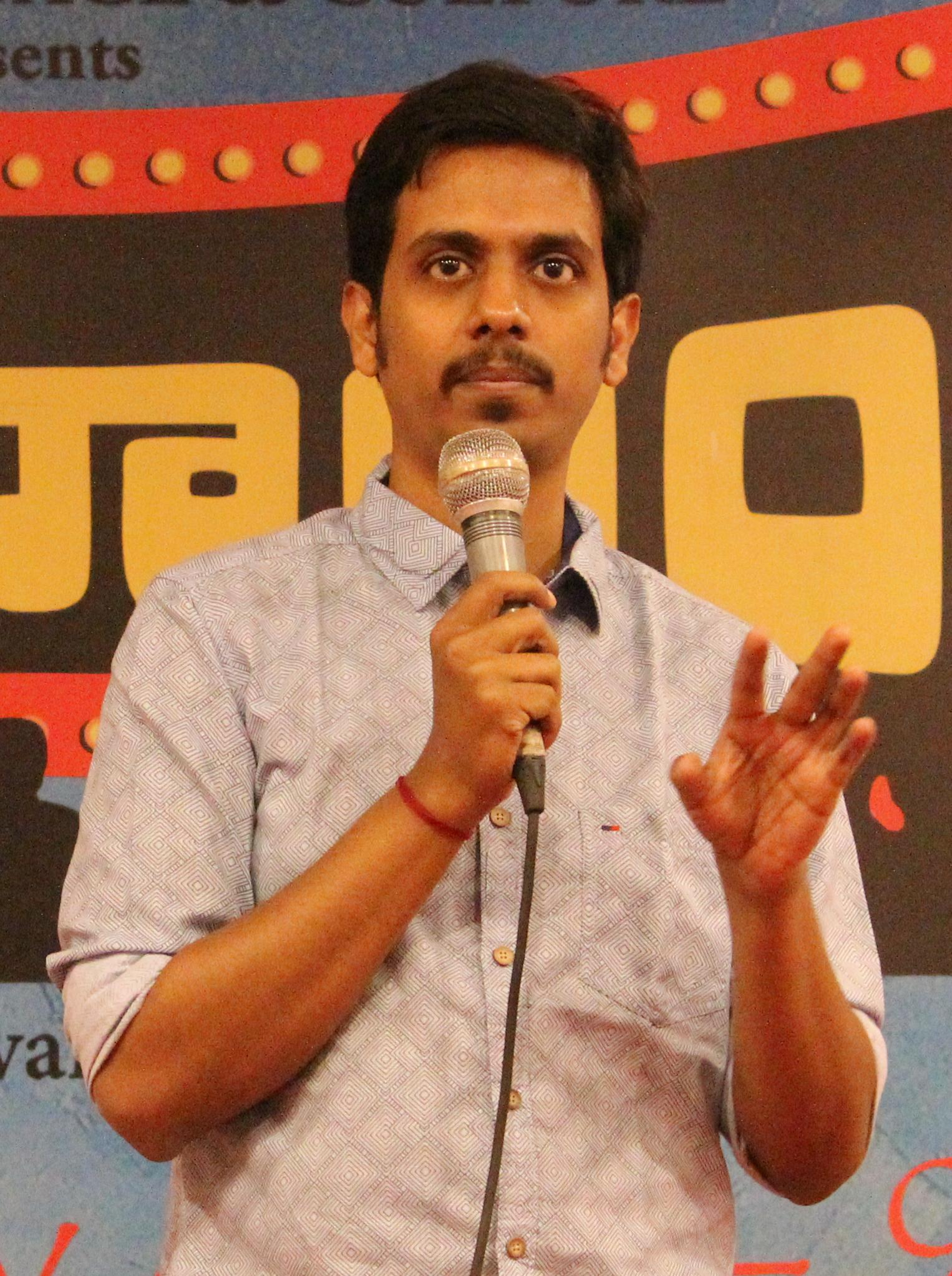
- Sankalp Reddy in Cinivaram, Ravindra Bharathi, Hyderabad in 2017.
- Born: 20 October 1984 (age 41); Hyderabad, Telangana, India
- Education: CVR College of Engineering
- Occupations: Director, writer
- Years active: 2014 – present
- Spouse: Keerthi Reddy
- Children: 2

Sankalp Reddy (born October 20, 1984) is an Indian film director, and screenwriter who primarily works in Telugu cinema. He made his directorial debut with the Pan-Indian war film Ghazi (2017) which won the National Film Award for Best Feature Film in Telugu. Reddy later directed science fiction film Antariksham 9000 KMPH (2018).

== Early life ==
Sankalp Reddy was born and brought up in Hyderabad. He graduated from CVR College of Engineering and moved to Australia for his MBA at Griffith University, Brisbane. He later dropped out after a semester and joined Griffith Film School, a top creative arts school in Australia, for pursuing MFA in film direction.

== Career ==
Reddy researched about submarines for a year and decided to make a film set in a submarine. Later, he wrote a book titled The Blue Fish to own the copyrights to make a film. It later was the basis of his feature film debut with Ghazi (2017). The film is inspired by true events from the Indo-Pakistani war of 1971.

The war film is an underwater tale of the courage and patriotism of the men aboard the Indian submarine, INS Karanj (S21), which destroyed the Pakistani PNS Ghazi when it ventured into Indian waters to destroy INS Vikrant on the shores of R. K. Beach in Visakhapatnam. Ghazi was screened at the Jagran Film Festival, and garnered the National Film Award for Best Feature Film in Telugu at the 65th National Film Awards 2018.

In 2018, Reddy directed the space thriller film Antariksham 9000 KMPH, starring Varun Tej. Though it was praised for its attempt to introduce a new genre in Telugu cinema, it ended up as a commercial failure. He then directed IB71, a 2023 Indian Hindi-language spy thriller film based on the 1971 Indian Airlines hijacking.

== Filmography ==
Key
†	Denotes films that have not yet been released

Year	Title	Language	Note
2017	Ghazi	Telugu; Hindi	Bilingual film
2018	Antariksham 9000 KMPH	Telugu	
2021	Pitta Kathalu	Telugu	Segment: "Pinky"
2023	IB71	Hindi	

== Awards ==
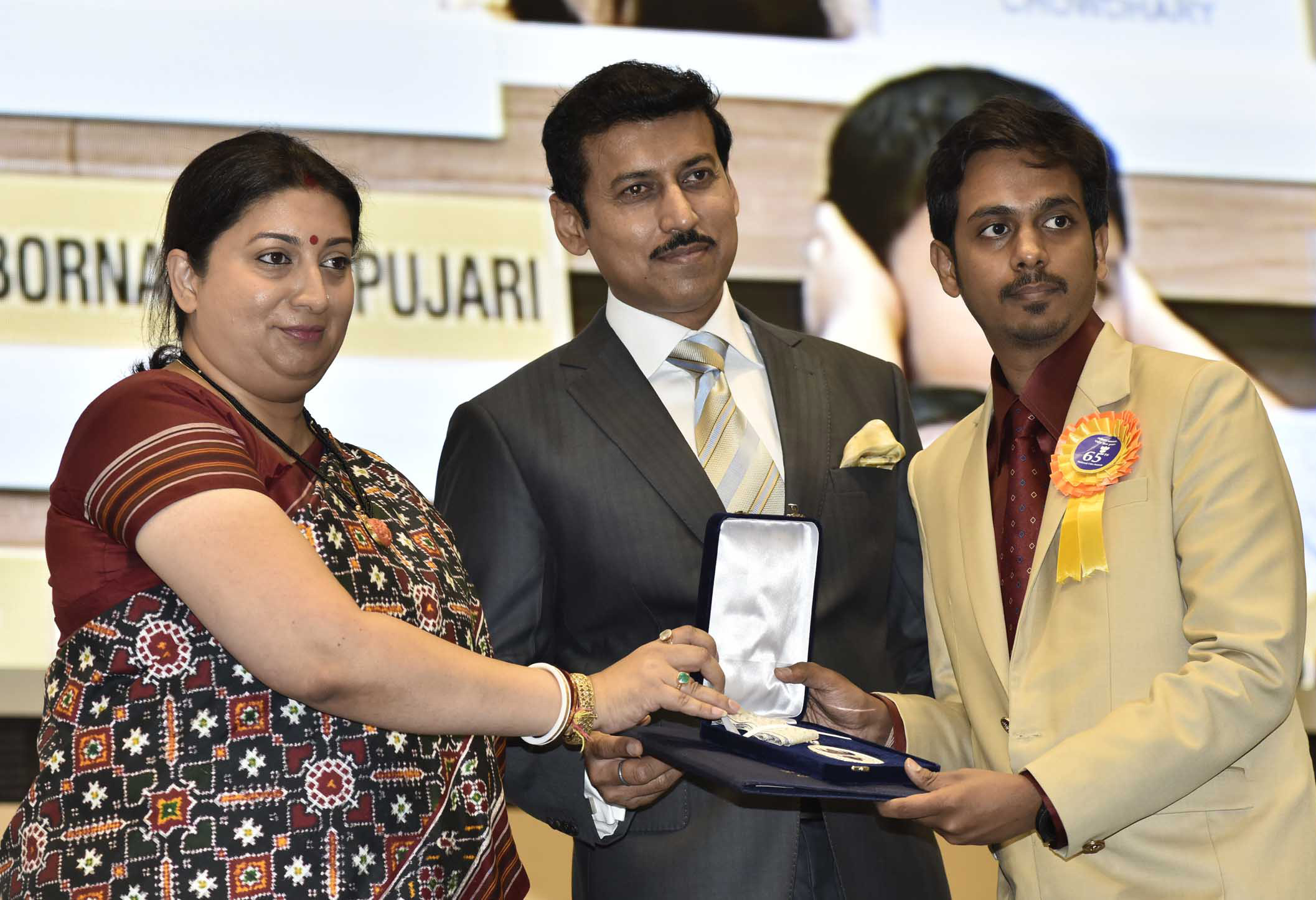
Reddy (right) receiving the National Film Award

Film	Award	Category	Result	Ref.
Ghazi	65th National Film Awards	Best Feature Film - Telugu	Won	
Ghazi	65th Filmfare Awards South	Best Director	Nominated	
Ghazi	7th SIIMA Awards	Best Director (Telugu)	Nominated	
Ghazi	7th SIIMA Awards	Best Debut Director	Nominated	
Ghazi	16th Santosham Film Awards	Best Director	Won	
