= PNS Ghazi =

Tench-class submarine of Pakistan Navy

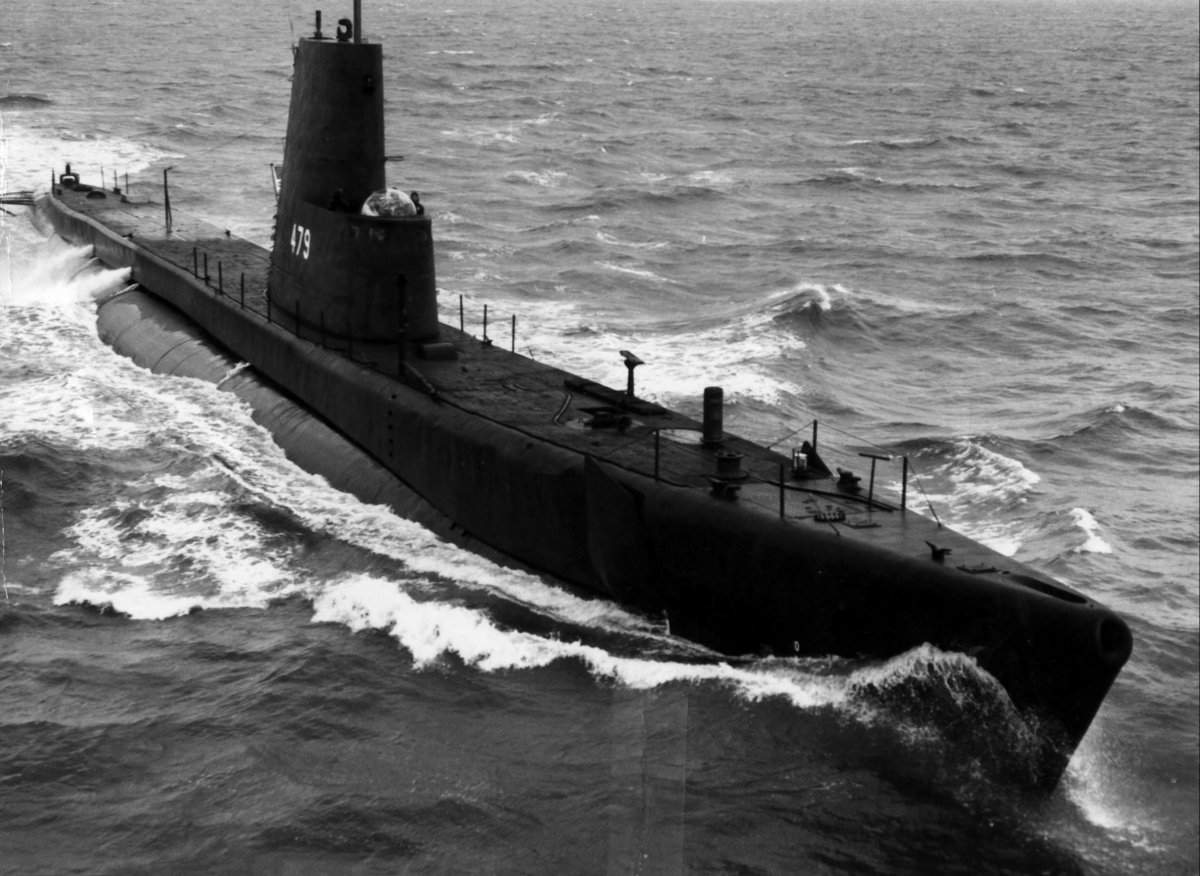
- The Tench-class submarine in the U.S. Navy's service as Diablo in 1964.

History

United States
- Name: Diablo
- Builder: Portsmouth Naval Shipyard, Kittery, Maine, United States
- Laid down: 11 August 1944
- Launched: 1 December 1944
- Commissioned: 31 March 1945
- Decommissioned: 1 June 1964
- Stricken: 4 December 1971
- Identification: SS-479
- Fate: Transferred to Pakistan on 1 June 1964

Pakistan
- Name: PNS Ghazi
- Cost: $1.5 million USD (1968) (Refit and MLU cost)
- Acquired: 1 June 1964
- Refit: 2 April 1970
- Home port: Karachi Naval Base
- Identification: S-130
- Honours and awards: 2×Sitara-e-Jurat; 1×President's Citation; 1×Tamgha-i-Jurat; 6×Sword of Honour
- Fate: Lost during 1971 war with 93 personnel onboard on 4/5 December 1971 in Bay of Bengal in East of Indian Ocean.

General characteristics
- Class & type: Tench-class diesel-electric submarine
- Displacement: 1,570 long tons (1,595 t) surfaced; 2,414 long tons (2,453 t) submerged
- Length: 311 ft 8 in (95.00 m)
- Beam: 27 ft 4 in (8.33 m)
- Draft: 17 ft (5.2 m) maximum
- Propulsion: 4 × Fairbanks-Morse Model 38D8-⅛ 10-cylinder opposed piston diesel engines driving electrical generators; 2 × 126-cell Sargo batteries; 2 × low-speed direct-drive Elliott electric motors; two propellers; 5,400 shp (4.0 MW) surfaced; 2,740 shp (2.0 MW) submerged
- Speed: 20.25 knots (37.50 km/h; 23.30 mph) surfaced; 8.75 knots (16.21 km/h; 10.07 mph) submerged
- Range: 11,000 nautical miles (20,000 km; 13,000 mi) surfaced at 10 knots (19 km/h; 12 mph)
- Endurance: 48 hours at 2 knots (3.7 km/h; 2.3 mph) submerged; 75 days on patrol
- Test depth: 400 ft (120 m) United States Navy service); 450 ft (140 m) (Pakistan Navy service)
- Complement: 10 officers, 71 enlisted (U.S. service); 11 officers, 82 enlisted (Pakistan service)
- Armament: 10 × 21 in (533 mm) torpedo tubes (6 forward, 4 aft), 28 torpedoes; 1 × 5 in (127 mm)/25-caliber deck gun; 1 × Bofors 40 mm cannon (US service); 1 × Oerlikon 20 mm cannon (later 2); 2 × .30 cal (7.62 mm) machine guns (Pakistan service); Minelaying capability after refit

PNS/M Ghazi (S–130) (previously USS Diablo (SS-479); reporting name: Ghazi), SJ, was a Tench-class diesel-electric submarine, the first fast-attack submarine in the Pakistan Navy. She was leased from the United States Navy in 1963.

She served in the United States Navy from 1945 to 1963 and was loaned to Pakistan under the Security Assistance Program (SAP) on a four-year lease after the Ayub administration successfully negotiated with the Kennedy administration for its procurement. In 1964, she joined the Pakistan Navy and saw military action in the Indo-Pakistani theatres in the 1965 and, later in the 1971 wars.

In 1968 Ghazi executed a submerged circumnavigation of Africa and southern parts of Europe through the Indian Ocean to the Atlantic Ocean, due to the closure of the Suez Canal, in order to be refitted and updated at Gölcük, Turkey. The submarine could be armed with up to 28 Mk.14 torpedoes and had the capability of mine-laying added as part of her refit.

Starting as the only submarine in the Indo-Pakistani war of 1965, Ghazi remained the Pakistan Navy's flagship submarine until in 1971, when she sank under mysterious circumstances near India's eastern coast while conducting naval operations en route to the Bay of Bengal. While the Indian Navy credits Ghazi's sinking to its destroyer INS Rajput, the Pakistani military oversights and reviews stated that "the submarine sank due to either an internal explosion or accidental detonation of mines being laid by the submarine off the Visakhapatnam harbour".

In 2010, it was revealed the Indian Navy destroyed all records of their investigations into this matter in 1980 after the Indo-Pakistani War of 1971. Nonetheless, Indian historians consider the sinking of Ghazi to be a notable event; as they have described the sinking as one of the "last unsolved greatest mysteries of the 1971 war."

== Service with United States Navy ==
Diablo, a long-range fast-attack Tench-class submarine was launched on 1 December 1944, sponsored by the wife of U.S. Navy Captain V. D. Chapline on 31 March 1945 with Lieutenant Commander Gordon Graham Matheson as her first commanding officer.

She was the only warship of the United States Navy to be named Diablo, which means "devil" in Spanish. The submarine's assigned and issued insignia patch identified the caricature image of the devil running with a torpedo in the sea.

After being commissioned at the Portsmouth Navy Yard on 31 March 1945, Diablo arrived at Pearl Harbor from New London, Connecticut on 21 July and sailed on her first war patrol on 10 August with instructions to stop at Saipan for final orders. With the ceasefire, her destination was changed to Guam where she arrived on 22 August 1945. On the last day of the month, she got underway for Pearl Harbor and the East Coast arriving at New York City on 11 October, except for a visit to Charleston, South Carolina in October where she remained at New York until 8 January 1946.

From 15 January 1946 to 27 April 1949, Diablo was based in the Panama Canal Zone participating in fleet exercises and rendering services to surface units in the Caribbean Sea. From 23 August to 2 October 1947, she joined the submarines Cutlass and Conger for a simulated war patrol down the west coast of South America and around Tierra del Fuego. The three submarines called at Valparaíso, Chile, in September while homeward bound. Diablo sailed to Key West, Florida, for antisubmarine warfare exercises, from 16 November to 9 December 1947, and operated from New Orleans, Louisiana, for the training of naval reservists in March 1948.

Diablo arrived at Naval Station Norfolk in Virginia, her new home port, on 5 June 1949, and participated in Operation Convex in 1951, and alternated training cruises with duty at the Sonar School at Key West. Her homeport became New London in 1952 and she arrived there 17 September to provide training facilities for the Submarine School.

From 3 May to 1 June 1954, she was attached to the Operational Development Force at Key West for tests of new weapons and equipment. She participated in Operation Springboard in the Caribbean from 21 February to 28 March 1955, and continued to alternate service with the Submarine School with antisubmarine warfare and fleet exercises in the Caribbean and off Bermuda, as well as rendering services to the Fleet Sonar School and Operational Development Force at Key West. Between February and April 1959, she cruised through the Panama Canal along the coasts of Colombia, Ecuador, Peru, and Chile for exercises with South American navies. On 27 May 1960, she entered Philadelphia Naval Shipyard for an overhaul which continued until October 1960.

In 1962 her hull classification symbol was changed to AGSS-479.

Diablo was decommissioned on 1 June 1964 and was commissioned in the Pakistani Navy the same day.

=== Awards ===
- Asiatic-Pacific Campaign Medal
- World War II Victory Medal
- National Defense Service Medal with star

== Service with Pakistan Navy ==
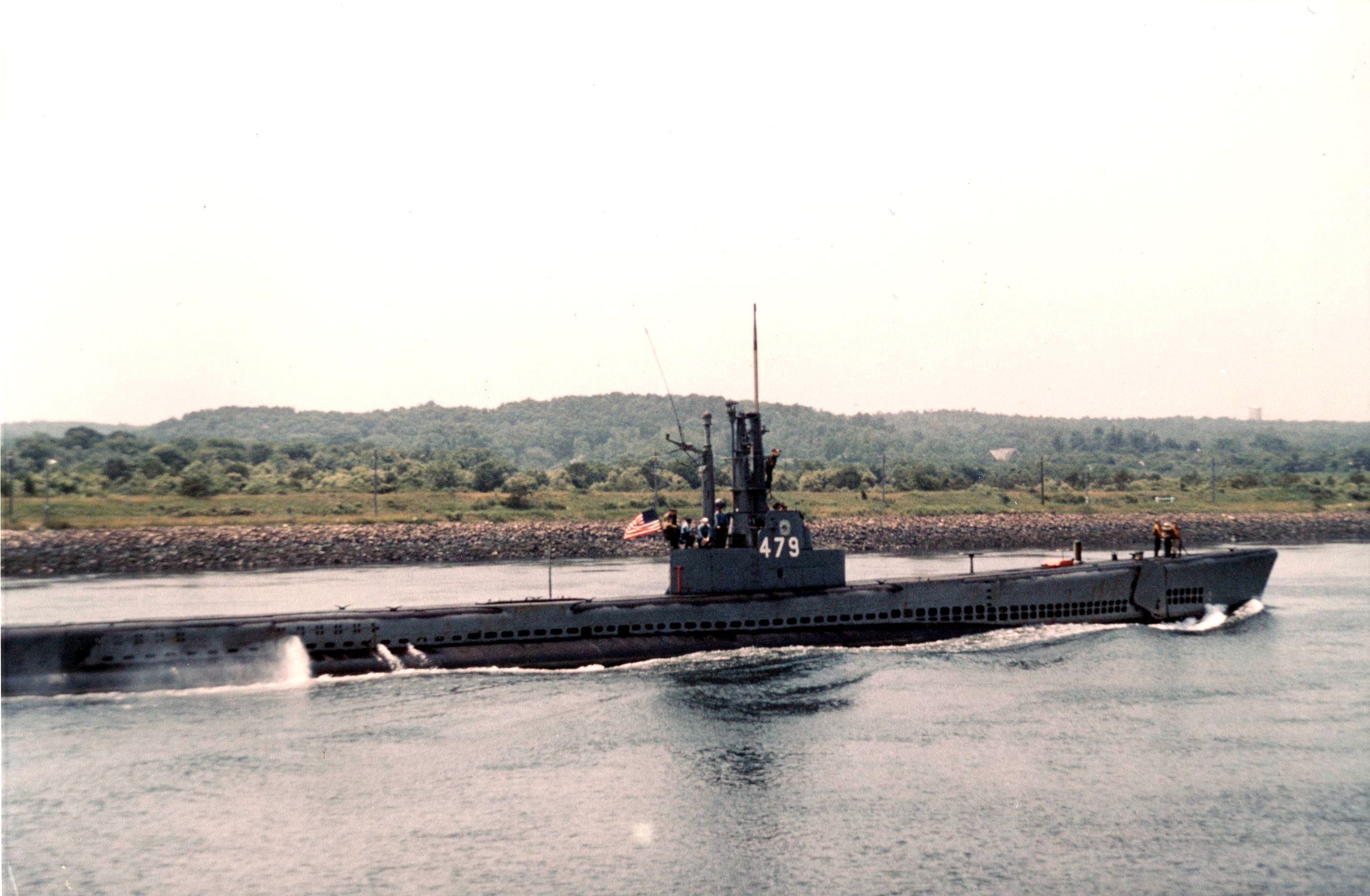
USS Diablo's sea trial in the Cape Cod Canal in 1945

The procurement and acquisition of Ghazi was a result of lengthy and complicated negotiation between the administrations of Pakistan and the United States. Since the 1950s the Pakistan Navy had been seeking to procure imported submarines, initially negotiating with the Royal Navy and subsequently also with the United States Navy.

With Ayub administration improving relations with the Eisenhower administration in 1960, Ghazi was finally procured under the Security Assistance Program (SAP) authorized by the Kennedy administration on a four-year lease with an option of renewing or purchasing the submarine afterwards in 1963.

Ghazi was the first submarine to be operated by a Navy in South Asia, becoming a serious threat to the Indian Navy. Contrary to popular perception, Ghazi technological feats were downgraded and extensively refitted its Fleet Snorkel under the Guppy program of the U.S. Navy at the Philadelphia Naval Dockyard, and was mostly unmodernized when she joined the services of Pakistan Navy. Naval historians had described Ghazi as an unarmed "clockwork mouse" used for training purposes. Nonetheless, the Indian Navy immediately was under the impression that it was militarized and an updated submarine that posed a serious threat.

She was fitted with 14 vintage Mark-14 torpedoes which had the controversy and notoriety of its own during World War II. On 4 September 1964 she arrived at the Naval Dockyard in Karachi and joined the Navy as its first long-range fast-attack submarine. She was named and designated as Ghazi (lit. Holiest Warrior) by the Pakistan Navy in 1964.

=== Western Front of the Indo-Pakistani war of 1965 ===
On 5 August 1965 war broke out between India and Pakistan as a result of a covert infiltration in Indian Kashmir. Ghazi, was at that time under command of then-Commander Karamat Rahman Niazi, who would later ascend as a four-star admiral in the Navy. Other officers who served in Ghazi were then-Lieutenant-Commander Ahmed Tasnim (later promoted as Vice-Admiral), Sub-Lieutenant Fasih Bokhari, and Lieutenant Zafar Muhammad who would later command her, as a Commander, in 1971.

Notable Naval Officers of Ghazi in 1965 included:

  - Cdr. K. R. Nyazi– Ofc–in–chrg. of Ghazi.
  - Lt-Cdr. Ahmed Tasnim–2nd-in-Cmd. of Ghazi
  - Lt-Cdr. Habib Ahmad-Electrical Officer of Ghazi
  - Lt. Z.M. Khan– Chief Navigation officer in Ghazi
  - S-Lt. Fasih Bokhari–then Torpedo officer in Ghazi

She was the only submarine in the conflict arena that was deployed in the war theatre, with a mission scope of attacking only heavy and major warships of the Indian Navy. She only aided the tactical task force under the command of Commodore S.M. Anwar that launched a naval artillery battery on the Indian Air Force's radar station in Dwarka, Gujarat, India. She was also seeking INS Vikrant, the only aircraft carrier, but did not detect her target during the entire conflict. On 9 September 1965 INS Beas made an unsuccessful depth charge attack in an attempt to make a contact with Ghazi.

On 17 September 1965 Ghazi made a surface contact and identified INS Brahmaputra and fired three World War II-era Mark 14 torpedoes and increased depth to evade counterattack. According to submarine war logs three distinct explosions were heard at about the time when the torpedoes should have impacted but Brahmaputra was not sunk, neither had it been hit since the warship did not release depth charges nor had it detected the sonar emissions of the Ghazi. No ships were sunk or damaged in the area and Ghazi safely reported back to base.

Upon her return she won ten war awards including two decorations of Sitara-e-Jurat, one Tamgha-i-Jurat and the President's citations and six Imtiazi Sanads while her commander, Cdr. K.R. Niazi was decorated with the Sitara-e-Jurat and chief petty officers were decorated with the Tamgha-i-Jurat. It is not known what Ghazi's target was or what the three mysterious explosions were since no inquiry report was ever submitted.

After the war in 1965–66 an arms embargo was placed on both India and Pakistan, but was later waived by the United States, strictly based on the cash and carry method as Ghazi badly needing refitting. In 1967 the Navy applied to renew another four-year lease deal which was duly approved by the U.S. Navy and the U.S. Government but her material state and equipment continued to deteriorate. The Navy then signed a deal with the Turkish Navy for a refit and mid-life update that was to be carried out at Gölcük in Turkey – the only facility to update the Tench-class submarines.

Because of the Six-Day War in the Middle East the Suez Canal was closed due to the Egyptian Navy's blockage in 1967, Ghazi, under the command of Commander Ahmed Tasnim, had to execute a submerged circumnavigation in 1968 from Africa to Western Europe, which began from Karachi coast to Cape of Good Hope, South Africa and then through the Atlantic Ocean. It ended at the east coast of the Sea of Marmara where the Gölcük Naval Shipyard is located. Chief of Naval Staff Admiral S.M. Ahsan had arranged necessary refitting of Ghazi's computers at the Karachi Shipyard & Engineering Works (KSEW) with help of the local industry such as DESTO.

During her submerged circumnavigation voyage she briefly stopped at Mombasa, Kenya for refueling and, in Maputo, Mozambique before making a farewell visit at Simon's Town, South Africa. After passing the Cape of Good Hope, she made another stopover at Luanda, Angola for victualing and continued her journey towards Western Europe to stopover at Toulon, France, where she was greeted by the French Navy. Her final stopover was at İzmir in Turkey and she continued submerged through the east coast of the Sea of Marmara to dock at the Gölcük Naval Shipyard, which was the only facility to upgrade the Tench-class based computers and other electromechanical equipment. It took her two months to complete her circumnavigation of Africa and Europe.

Refitting and mid-life upgrading of her military computers reportedly cost ~$1.5 million ($11.1 million in 2015–16). The program started in March 1968 and completed in April 1970 and it is believed that the U.S-made ill-fitted World War II era Mk.14/Mk.10 naval mines were bought "secretly" from Turkey.

=== Eastern Front of Indo-Pakistani war of 1971 ===
Under the command of Lieutenant-Commander Yousaf Raza, Ghazi returned to Karachi coast after successfully completing the submerged circumnavigation of Africa which was taken in order to undergo a refitting program and mid-life updates of her military computers on 2 April 1970.

In August 1971 the Indian Navy transferred INS Vikrant, its aircraft carrier, to the Eastern Naval Command in Visakhapatnam, which forced the Pakistan Navy to adjust its submarine operations. Before 1971 there were several proposals made to the Ayub administration to strengthen the naval defence of East Pakistan, but none were made feasible and the Navy was in no position to mount a defence against approaching Indian naval advances. After the defection of Pakistan Navy's Bengali officers and sailors to India, the Eastern Command (Pakistan) was under intense pressure to counter the insurgency and the advance of the Indian Army towards East Pakistan on three fronts. The Yahya administration insisted the Navy attempt to reinforce the naval defence of the East while the Navy NHQ objected to the idea of deploying Ghazi in the total absence of a seaport, straying away from their original plan. Many senior commanders had felt that the deployment of Ghazi was highly dangerous and impossible to achieve by sending the obsolete submarine behind enemy lines but deployment came when it became apparent that war was inevitable.

Prior to her deployment Ghazi continued to experience equipment failures and reportedly had aging issues. Since it was the only submarine of the Pakistan Navy and had the range and capability to undertake operations in the distant waters controlled by India, Ghazi was pressed into operation to destroy or damage Vikrant. On 14 November 1971 she quietly sailed 3,000 miles (4,800 km) around the Indian peninsula from the Arabian Sea to the Bay of Bengal under the command of Zafar Muhammad, who commanded a submarine for the first time, with 10 officers and 82 sailors. Ghazi was on a two-fold mission: the primary goal was to locate and sink Vikrant and secondary was to mine India's eastern seaboard, which was to be fulfilled irrespective of the accomplishment of the first.

Another problem faced by PNS Ghazi was the poor conditions of maintenance facilities at Chittagong port in East Pakistan.

== Fate ==
The sinking of Ghazi took place on 4 December 1971 during its hunt to find Vikrant and/or during the minelaying mission on the Visakhapatnam Port, Bay of Bengal. The cause of the sinking is still disputed, and Indian and Pakistani sources have different views.

On 16 November, she was in contact with the Navy NHQ and Commander Khan charted the coordinates that reported that she was 400 kilometres (250 mi) off Bombay. On 19 November, she was off to Sri Lanka and entered the Bay of Bengal on 20 November 1971. Around this time, the Top Secret files were opened as instructed and the hunt for INS Vikrant began on 23 November and PNS Ghazi was off to Madras where reportedly the Indian aircraft carrier was stationed, but she was 10 days late and INS Vikrant was now actually somewhere near the Andaman Islands. Unable to detect her target, PNS Ghazi's commanders became disillusioned about their hunt for Vikrant and turned back to Visakhapatnam to start laying mines off the harbour with a confidence that it would take a swipe at INS Vikrant or at least bottle up the Indian Navy's heavy units clustered in this major Indian naval base on the night of 2–3 December 1971".

On 1 December 1971, Vice Admiral Nilakanta Krishnan briefed Captain Inder Singh, the commanding officer of INS Rajput, that a Pakistani submarine had been sighted off the Sri Lankan coast and was absolutely certain that the submarine would be somewhere around Madras or Visakhapatnam. He made it clear that once INS Rajput had completed refueling, she must leave the harbor with all navigational aids switched off.

According to Indian claims at 23:40 on 3 December 1971, taking on board a pilot, INS Rajput moved through the channel to the exit from Visakhapatnam.

At midnight, shortly after passing the entrance buoy, the starboard lookout reported a breaker on the surface of the water right on the nose. According to the Indian Navy's claims, Captain Singh changed the course at full speed across the specified point and ordered to drop two depth charges, which was done. The explosions were "stunning", and Rajput suffered a serious material concussion to its structure. However, visible results of this attack are not given. INS Rajput for some time surveyed the area dropping depth charges, but did not regain contact — either visual or acoustic. A few minutes later the destroyer continued her way to the coast of East Pakistan (now Bangladesh).

On the night of 3–4 December 1971, Ghazi sank with all 93 servicemen on board (11 officers and 82 enlisted) off the Visakhapatnam coast, allowing the Indian Navy to effect a naval blockade of East Pakistan.

=== Intelligence and deception ===
According to Indian DNI's director Rear-Admiral Mihir K. Roy, Ghazi's existence was revealed when a signal addressed to naval authorities in Chittagong was intercepted, requesting information on a lubrication oil only used by submarines and minesweepers.

Indian Navy intelligence tracked Ghazi with a codename issued as Kali Devi, and the Indian Navy began to realize that the Pakistanis would inevitably be forced to send their submarine Ghazi to the Bay of Bengal, as the sole ship which could operate in these waters.

Vice Admiral Nilakanta Krishnan of the Eastern Naval Command had maintained that it was clear that Pakistan would have deployed Ghazi in the Bay of Bengal and a part of its plan was an attempt to sink the Indian aircraft carrier Vikrant. At the same time concerted action was taken to disseminate misinformation designed to mislead the enemy about the true location of the aircraft carrier, and to foster confidence that the carrier was stationed at Visakhapatnam. In particular the D 41 Rajput was instructed to move from Vishakhapatnam to Madras, sending signals as if it were the Vikrant.

All these activities were apparently successful in deceiving Ghazi when on 25 November 1971, the Navy NHQ communicated with Ghazi that stated: "Intel indicates carrier in port".

== Aftermath ==
On 26 November 1971, Ghazi was expected to communicate with the Navy NHQ to submit its mission report but did not communicate with its base. The Navy NHQ repeatedly made frantic efforts to establish the communication and anxiety grew as days passed for her return to the base. Before the naval hostilities broke out, commanding officers had started worrying about Ghazi's fate but the Navy NHQ senior command had replied to their junior officers that several reasons could be attributed to the failure of the submarine to communicate.

On 9 December, the Indian Navy issued a statement about the fate of Ghazi. The first indication of Ghazi's fate came when a message from the Indian NHQ, claiming sinking of Ghazi on the night of 3 December, was intercepted. The Indian NHQ issued the statement a few hours before the loss of INS Khukri, and prior to launch of second missile attack on Karachi port.

=== Indian version ===
After the ceasefire in 1971, the Government of India undertook an investigation into the incident and immediately claimed that the submarine was sunk following the series of manoeuvres by the Indian Navy. A submarine rescue vessel, INS Karanj was sent to check the debris and India later built a "Victory at Sea Memorial" on the coast near where Ghazi was sunk. India credits the INS Rajput for sinking Ghazi and her crew were honored with gallantry awards for this event, but the actual details of Ghazi's sinking became unclear, as new narratives soon began to emerge after the war.

The claim of sinking Ghazi has been the centre of controversy between the Indian authors, giving doubts in their theories of mysterious sinking of the submarine. With Commodore Ranjit Roy testifying that "very loud explosion effects were heard at the beach that came from underwater." Commodore Roy also concluded that "...at that time, how the Ghazi was sunk remained unclear as it does today."

The official history of the Indian Navy, Transition to Triumph, authored by retired Vice-Admiral G.M. Hiranandani, gave an exhaustive account of the sinking of Ghazi. He quoted naval records and top naval officials who commanded operations on the eastern seafront as saying that INS Rajput was sent from Visakhapatnam to track down Ghazi. The book also noted that the time of dropping of the charges, the explosion which was heard by the people of Visakhapatnam and that of a clock recovered from Ghazi, matched. However, Admiral Hiranandani maintained that the submarine almost certainly suffered an internal explosion but its causes are debatable.

Admiral Roy of India stated: "The theories propounded earlier by some who were unaware of the ruse de guerre (attempt to fool the enemy in wartime) leading to the sinking of the first submarine in the Indian Ocean gave rise to smirks from within our own (Indian) naval service for an operation which instead merited a Bravo Zulu (flag hoist for Well Done)".

Admiral S. M. Nanda, Chief of Naval Staff of the Indian Navy during the conflict, stated : "In narrow channels, ships, during an emergency or war, always throw depth charges around them to deter submarines. One of them probably hit the Ghazi. The blow-up was there, but nobody knew what it was all about until the fisherman found the life jacket".

In 2003, the Indian Navy again sent its divers to overlook its investigation and the divers recovered some items including the war logs, official backup tapes from her computers, and mission files that were sent to the Eastern Naval Command of the Indian Navy. The divers who studied the wreckage confirmed that the submarine must have suffered an internal explosion which blew up its mines and torpedoes. Another theory suggests an explosion of hydrogen gas which built up inside the submarine while its batteries were being charged underwater.

In 2010, Lieutenant-General J. F. R. Jacob of Eastern Command mentioned in an article that "Ghazi was destroyed in an accident in which Indian Navy was not involved. There were many opinions from authors of the Indian side who also shared this scepticism of the Indian Navy's official stance." Jacob also stated in the article that the Indian Navy had no information about the sinking of Ghazi until they were informed by the local fishermen the next day.

In 2010, it was reported that the Indian Navy had destroyed all records of the sinking of the submarine Ghazi. Vice Admiral G.M. Hiranandani, who was tasked with writing the official history of the navy, said that he was unable to obtain any old files regarding Ghazi sinking. One of the retired navy officers who saw action in 1971 said that the destruction of the Ghazi papers and those of the army in Kolkata depicts the many instances when Indian war history has been deliberately falsified. He further stated that 'We have enough heroes. In the fog of war, many myths and false heroes may have been created and many honest ones left unsung'.

In 2011, former Indian naval chief Admiral Arun Prakash quoted in the national security conference that [Ghazi] had sunk under mysterious circumstances, "not by INS Rajput as originally claimed." Parkash later published an article in Indian media in 2021 in which he stated that PNS Ghazi sank due to an internal explosion.

=== Pakistani military oversights ===
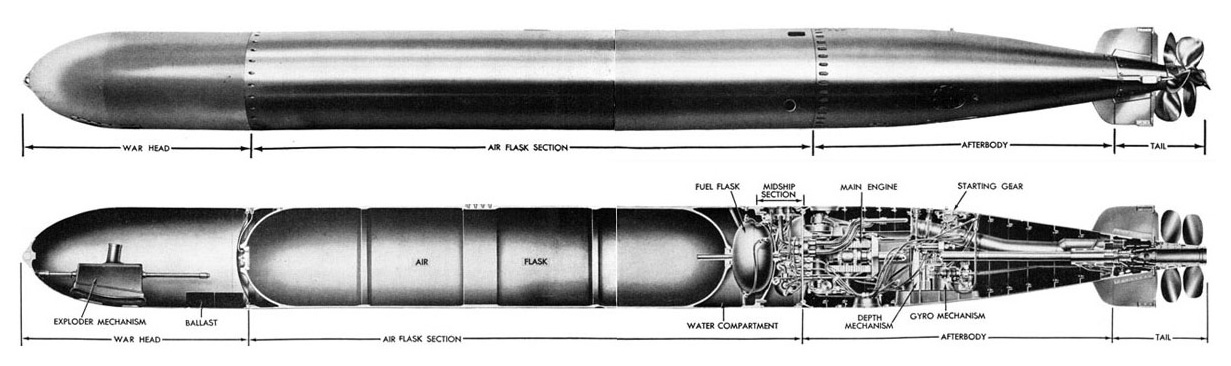
The sideview of Mk.14 torpedoes deployed in Ghazi

In 1972, the Hamoodur Rahman Commission (HRC) never carried out an investigation into this incident despite its formation to assess the military and political failures of the country in the war of 1971.

It was only on 10 February 1972, when the incident was officially recognised by the Government of Pakistan and then-President Zulfikar Bhutto met with the grieving families and loved ones of the officers and sailors who served in Ghazi, and told them that they may have all perished due to this incident as many of the slain family members were pushing for repatriation to the Government of Pakistan as they were keeping the hope alive that they may have survived and rescued by India.

The Naval Intelligence conducted its own investigations and its military oversights stated that Ghazi sank, when the mines it was laying, were accidentally detonated. Pakistani military oversights into this incident were not immediate. Instead, the Naval Intelligence took time to conclude its investigations that went on for several years. Over the decades, the military oversights were kept hidden and were not known to the public until 1990s when the Navy made an announcement over the completion of its insights into this incident. Following this announcement, Pakistan addressed the problems connecting the electromechanical failures, computer problems, and Mk.14 torpedoes' "circular deep running" once launched from the firing ship.

Pakistan never accepted the theory from the Indian Navy but provided its alternative insights into this disaster based on the investigations on the Mark 14 torpedoes and other vintage military equipment installed in Ghazi. According to the Pakistan Navy's investigation, there were two probable reasons connecting to this mishappening:

- *Magnetic exploder/hydrogen explosion: A Sargo-type lead-acid battery may have over-produced hydrogen gas during the charging of the submarine's batteries that may have led to a violent internal explosion.
- *Detonation of a mine inside the submarine: This was often cited by the Pakistan Navy as the World War II-era Mk.10/Mk.14 torpedoes may have deep "circular" run, failing to straighten its run once set on its prescribed gyro-angle setting, and instead, to run in a large circle, thus returning to strike the firing ship.

Another theory from foreign experts, also favoured by Pakistan, is that the explosive shock waves from one of the depth charges set off the torpedoes and mines (some of which may have been armed for laying) stored aboard the submarine. The Navy NHQ counter-argued: Ghazi itself may have inadvertently passed over the mines during the mine laying operations; patrolling Indian vessels or Indian depth charges might also have tripped the count mechanism of one or more mines. Credibility is added to this story by the later discovery made by Indian Coast Guard divers in 2003, that the damaged parts of the submarine had been blown inside out.

From information found in the investigation conducted on the cause of the loss of the American submarine USS Cochino, it is possible that the lead-acid battery vented explosive hydrogen gas while charging underwater. Henceforth the hydrogen gas, if not properly vented, could have accumulated into an explosive concentration.

In addition, the NI's investigations also exposed the deployment of Ghazi when it was indicated that there was no indication that Ghazi's crew had ever practiced with mines, and most of its crew including its commanding officer were relatively new to the submarine for the magnitude of this type of deployment. As opposed to the U.S. Navy service which had restricted to the personnel of 81, the Ghazi's complement was about 93, the award, Star of Courage, acknowledged that were there were 12 extra personnel aboard the boat at the time of its sinking. An increase in the sub's total complement would put a strain on the logistical capabilities of a patrol because it reduces its duration.

In 2006, Pakistan, citing their evidences, rejected India's claim of sinking Ghazi and termed the claims as "false and utterly absurd".

=== Neutral witnesses and assessments ===
An independent testimony stems from an Egyptian naval officer who was at that time serving on an Egyptian submarine which was undergoing refit in the harbour. He has confirmed the occurrence of a powerful explosion in the vicinity of the harbor late at night. There were no naval ships, as reported by this officer, outside the harbor at that time and it was not until about an hour after the explosion that two Indian naval ships were observed leaving harbor.

Some independent writers and investigators maintained Ghazi was sunk mysteriously not by two depth charges alone, Ghazi may have sunk either by the hydrogen explosion produced when the batteries were charging, or by the detonation of a mine, or either by the sea floor impact while trying to avoid the depth charge released by INS Rajput.

In 2012, Pakistani investigative journalists from The Express Tribune who were affiliated with the Express News USA based in Washington D.C. were able to get in touch with Diablo's retired and now-aged former US Navy crew members who were allowed to study the sonar pictures and sketches of the sunken vessel where they believed that: "an explosion in the Forward Torpedo Room (FTR) destroyed the Ghazi." This view is also shared by Indian journalist Sandeep Unnithan, who specializes in military and strategic analysis.

=== Recovery of sunken vessel ===
In 1972, both the United States and the Soviet Union offered to raise the submarine to the surface at their expense. The Government of India, however, rejected these offers and allowed the submarine to sink further into the mud off the fairway buoy of Visakhapatnam.

In 2003, Indian Navy divers recovered a few items from the submarine and brought up six bodies of Pakistani servicemen when they blasted their way into the submarine. All six servicemen were given military honorary burial by the Indian Navy. Items recovered were the back-up tapes of the radar computers, war logs, broken windshield, top secret files, as well as one of the bodies of a petty officer mechanical engineer (POME) who had a wheel spanner tightly grasped in his fist. Another sailor had in his pocket a letter written in Urdu to his fiancée.

In 2003, additional photos were released by the Indian Navy of the vessel.

== Legacy ==
=== In memory ===
In 1972, Ghazi and her serving officers as well as crew members were honoured with gallantry awards by the Government of Pakistan. After the war, President Richard Nixon forgave the remaining debt of Ghazi to Pakistan when the U.S. Navy's CNO Admiral Elmo Zumwalt visited Admiral Mohammad Shariff in Calcutta in 1972. In addition, she remained the first and to-date the only U.S.-built submarine to have served in the Pakistan Navy, although in successive years, only surface warships had been acquired through transfers from the United States as Pakistan worked towards building its own long-range submarines, the Agosta 90B, through a technology transfer from France.

At the Naval Dockyard in Karachi, a 'Ghazi Monument' was built to perpetuate the memory of the submarine and its 93 men. In 1974, the naval base, PNS Zafar, was commissioned and constructed in the memory of Commander Zafar Muhammad Khan that now serves as the headquarter for Northern Naval Command. In 1975, the Navy acquired the Albacora-class submarine from the Portuguese Navy and named it Ghazi (S-134), in memory of PNS Ghazi.

Her loss to the Pakistan Navy through an accident was a watershed and a significant event, leading the Navy's engineering to the implementation of a rigorous submarine safety programme.

In 1998, the Inter-Services Public Relations produced and released the film, Ghazi Shaheed which starred Shabbir Jan as commander of Ghazi, and Mishi Khan as Commander's wife; the film is based on the events involving Ghazi's mission and the lives of men who served in Ghazi. Another movie, Untold Stories: Ghazi and Hangor were sponsored and released by the ISPR to commemorate Ghazi and her crew during their missions in 1971. In 2017, an Indian film was based on this submarine attack named The Ghazi Attack.

In 2016, PNS Hameed was commissioned where Ghazi was honoured and is a namesake of her first officer, Lt-Cdr. Pervez Hameed.

=== Notable commanders ===
- Commander Gordon Graham Matheson–U.S. Navy officer and her first commanding officer, commanded from 1945 to 1946.
- Commander Karamat Rahman Niazi– later appointed as the four-star rank admiral, commanded from 1964 to 1966.
- Commander Ahmed Tasnim– Hangor's commander in 1971 and later Vice-Admiral, commanded Ghazi from 1966 to 1969.
- Lieutenant Commander Yousaf Raza– commanded Ghazi from 1969 to 1971
- Commander Zafar Muhammad– the last commander until her sinking in 1971.

=== Honours and awards ===
Sitara-e-Jurat (Awarded in 1965 and 1971)

President's Citation (Citation in 1965)

Tamgha-i-Jurat (Awarded in 1965)

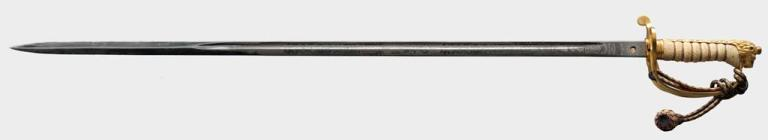
Sword of Honour (Awarded in 1965)

== In popular culture ==
- Ghazi Shaheed , a 1996 Pakistani film describing the submarine's journey.
- Ghazi, a 2017 Indian film based on sinking of PNS Ghazi.
- Raazi a 2018 Indian spy thriller film directed by Meghna Gulzar about the Indian spy mission that provided intelligence about PNS Ghazi's mission to attack INS Vikrant

== See also ==
- Pakistan Navy Submarine Command
- PNS Hangor (S131)
- Soviet submarine K-129 (1960), which sank on 8 March 1968 in the Pacific Ocean under mysterious circumstances
