= Ghazi (film) =

2017 film by Sankalp Reddy

- Theatrical release poster
- Directed by: Sankalp Reddy
- Written by: Azad Alam; Gangaraju Gunnam
- Screenplay by: Sankalp Reddy; Gangaraju Gunnam; Niranjan Reddy
- Produced by: Anvesh Reddy; Dil Raju; Prasad V Potluri; NM Pasha; Jagan Mohan Vancha
- Starring: Rana Daggubati; Atul Kulkarni; Kay Kay Menon; Taapsee Pannu; Rahul Singh; Satyadev
- Cinematography: R. Madhi
- Edited by: A. Sreekar Prasad
- Music by: Krishna Kumar
- Production companies: PVP Cinema; Matinee Entertainment
- Distributed by: Dharma Productions; AA Films (Hindi version)
- Release date: 17 February 2017
- Running time: 123 minutes
- Country: India
- Languages: Telugu; Tamil Hindi
- Budget: ₹15 crore

Ghazi, later titled The Ghazi Attack, is a 2017 Indian period war film written and directed by Sankalp Reddy. Produced in Telugu cinema, the film was shot simultaneously in Telugu and Hindi languages. The film stars Kay Kay Menon, Atul Kulkarni, Rana Daggubati, Taapsee Pannu and Satya Dev.

Ghazi is inspired by the sinking of PNS Ghazi during the Indo-Pakistani War of 1971. The story follows a submarine of the Indian Navy, an executive naval officer, and his team, who remain underwater for 18 days. The film depicts the valour of the crew aboard the Indian submarine INS Karanj (S21), which—according to Indian claims—destroyed the Pakistani submarine PNS Ghazi when it entered Indian waters with the objective of destroying INS Vikrant off the coast of Visakhapatnam.

The film was theatrically released on 17 February 2017 to widespread critical acclaim and emerged as a commercial success, grossing over ₹62 crore worldwide against a budget of ₹15 crore. The film won the National Film Award for Best Feature Film in Telugu, and received nominations for Best Film and Best Director at the 65th Filmfare Awards South. It also won the state Gaddar Award for Third Best Feature Film.

== Plot ==
In November 1971, India and Pakistan are on the verge of declaring war on each other as a result of the refugee crisis precipitated by the Pakistan Army under Operation Searchlight. The Indian Navy and RAW decipher a secret code sent from Pakistan to East Pakistan (modern-day Bangladesh), relating to a possible attack on an Indian naval vessel. The Navy deduces that the target may be INS Vikrant, India's sole aircraft carrier. The top command dispatches the submarine S21, under the command of Captain Ran Vijay Singh, for reconnaissance missions. To temper Singh's belligerent tendencies, the Indian Navy Admiral assigns Lt.Cmdr Arjun Varma to S21, with orders to ensure that Singh does not confront any Pakistani warships and trigger a war.

The Navy's top command soon learns that the Pakistan Navy has dispatched PNS Ghazi, under Cmdr. Razak Khan, to the Bay of Bengal to confront Vikrant. Meanwhile, to divert the attention of the enemy, Ghazi torpedoes an Indian merchant ship. The attack is picked by S21, which races to the scene. Noticing survivors in the wreckage, Arjun jumps into the sea and manages to rescue a girl child and a woman, both of whom are Bengali refugees. During surveillance, S21 acquires a sonar signal of Ghazi.

Singh believes that they should track down Ghazi and attack, while Arjun obstructs, reiterating his instructions. Singh then orders the ship's EXO, Lt. Commander Santosh Devraj, to conduct a drill and target Ghazi while doing so, despite Arjun's protests. They fire a torpedo, which misses Ghazi narrowly, thus alerting them of their presence. Aware of the enemy's presence, Razak orders his crew to head towards Visakhapatnam Port at full speed and to set up mines en route, planning to destroy S21.

S21 pursues Ghazi's path, but they realize at the last moment that it is headed into mines. Singh and Arjun frantically attempt to change its course, but a mine explodes in the stern and damages most of the submarine's batteries, propellers, and circuits. The sub blows open many leaks, with the forward torpedo compartment flooded, crippling the sub and barring it from firing its forward torpedoes. Singh dies while trying to save Arjun, as S21 sinks to the seabed.

Arjun, now in command of the sub, regroups and works towards reviving S21. They manage to clog the sub's leaks and pump the excess water out before holding a final farewell for Singh. The crew notices that the vessel is incapable of moving in any direction except upwards or downwards. Since they are unable to chase Ghazi, the crew artificially triggers one of the naval mines in its vicinity to lure Ghazi to their position. Razak, believing S21 is still operational, orders his crew to turn around to sink S21. Arjun and Devraj plan to lure Ghazi within its range of firing, but a suspicious Razak orders Ghazi's course to be changed at the last minute.

Ghazi, now having the ability to attack S21, fires six torpedoes, all of which are avoided by S21 through depth-changing maneuvers, much to Razak's frustration. S21 dives to 350m in order to slip from Ghazi's sonar range despite being designed for a maximum depth of 250m. With very limited battery support, Arjun provokes Razak into attacking by transmitting his crew singing 'Saare Jahaan se Achchha' and the Indian National Anthem. Riled up by S21's defiance, Razak orders another torpedo attack on S21, for which Ghazi will have to turn by port 180 degrees (all the way around, so that the other side faces S21). Arjun dives into the flooded forward compartment to manually trigger the torpedoes, successfully managing to do so. Ghazi also launches its torpedo at the same time. The torpedo launched by Ghazi misses S21 narrowly, but it is hit by S21's torpedo and disintegrates in the water, killing the entire crew. S21 surfaces, and the crew manages to save Arjun from the flooded compartment in the nick of time. S21 is later saved by a patrolling Indian Navy vessel.

The ending titles narrate the mysterious circumstances of Ghazi's fate, with its sinking credited to the actions of INS Rajput. It also mentions that in the aftermath of Ghazi's sinking, India and Pakistan had declared war on each other, which would ultimately result in India's victory, Pakistan's surrender, and the creation of Bangladesh.

== Cast ==
- Rana Daggubati as Lieutenant Commander Arjun Varma
- Kay Kay Menon as Captain Ran Vijay Singh
- Atul Kulkarni as Lieutenant Commander Santosh Devraj, Executive Officer
- Taapsee Pannu as Dr. Ananya, a Bengali doctor turned refugee
- Om Puri as Admiral V.S. Nanda, Indian Navy (based on Sardarilal Mathradas Nanda)
- Nassar as Vice Admiral K.T. Raman, Indian Navy (based on Jal Cursetji)
- Milind Gunaji as Girish Kumar, R&AW Agent
- Rahul Singh as Pakistani Commander Razak Khan, PNS Ghazi (based on Zafar Muhammad Khan)
- Satyadev as Rajeev Thakur, Sonar operator S21
- Ravi Varma as Kamalakar Shinde, Battery operator of the S21
- Priyadarshi Pullikonda as Lt. Nilesh Mishra, Radio operator of S21
- Bharath Reddy as B.Sanjay of S21
- Bikramjeet Kanwarpal as Pakistan Navy Staff Officer
- Thiruveer as V.Murthy, Depth Controller of S21
- Jay Jha as Navigation Officer, Ghazi
- Capt SN Ahmed as Lieutenant Taan Singh, torpedo operator of the S21
- Niteesh Pandey as N.Tiwari, steering controller of the S21
- Kunal Kaushik as Kapil Singh
- Malyaban Lahiri as Ranjan Sengupta, Junior Officer of the S21
- Naren Yadav as Ram Sagar of the S21
- Dhruva as Saleem of the S21
- Lakshmikanth Dev as Raj of the S21
- Ramanuj Dubey as Indian cook Iqbal S21
- Ravi Kumar Shada
- Akshay Mittal as Sub lieutenant – Indian Naval Navigation Officer S21
- Rama Rao Jadhav as Pump Controller S21
- Laxman Meesala
- Appaji Ambarisha Darbha as Ananya's father

== Production ==
=== Development ===
PVP Cinema has produced the film. Karan Johar distributed the Hindi version. The music is composed by K. Visual Effects handled by Eva Motion Studios.

=== Casting and crew ===
The film stars Rana Daggubati and Taapsee Pannu in the lead along with Kay Kay Menon, Satyadev, Atul Kulkarni, Ramanuj Dubey, Kunal Kaushik, Priyadarshi Pulikonda, Rahul Singh, Akshay Mittal, Malyaban Lahiri and Naren Yadav. Cinematography is done by Madhi, music composed by K, Visual Effects Supervisor Vasudeva R Enugala and editing by Sreeker Prasad.

=== Filming ===
The film shooting started on 3 January 2016.

== Historical accuracy ==
It is not so sure to say that "Indian Navy sunk the PNS Ghazi on 3 December 1971 at the Vishakhapatnam harbour when then Captain Inder Singh of INS Rajput ordered the attack upon it". Because Indian Navy official Vice Admiral Gulab Mohanlal Hiranandani said in his book (Transition to Triumph: history of the Indian navy, 1965–1975) "the truth about ghazi is unknown to many" and Pakistan Navy and neutral analysts believes the Ghazi might have sunk due to it mistakenly entering its own minefield and collided with one of the mines, which resulted in the violent underwater explosion. Historically sinking of German submarine U-864 remains the only incident in the history of naval warfare where one submarine sank another while both were submerged.

== Box office ==
Ghazi grossed a total of ₹62 crore (US$6.4 million) overall, including ₹55.3 crore (US$5.7 million), with a share of ₹24.45 in India and ₹6.7 crore overseas.

== Critical reception ==
On the review aggregator website Rotten Tomatoes, 67% of 6 critics' reviews are positive, with an average rating of 6.7/10.

Prasanna D Zore of Rediff said that, "The Ghazi Attack is a riveting telling of a war story" and gave the film a rating of 4 out of 5. Bollywood Hungama gave the film a rating of 3.5 out of 5 saying that the movie "is a gripping war drama that leaves a stunning impact." Renuka Vyavahare of The Times of India gave the film a rating of 3 out of 5 and said that, "While the visuals and special effects lack finesse, the film compensates for it with its riveting story. Despite the hitches, this underwater thriller is worth a watch."

Saibal Chatterjee of NDTV gave the film a rating of 2.5 out of 5 saying that, "The Ghazi Attack delivers many a riveting moment and is bolstered by the talent of a few capable actors. Its plot, however, is devoid of any mystery." Shalini Langer of The Indian Express gave the film a rating of 1.5 out of 5 saying that the film "could have been an engrossing crisis-at-sea drama but the film is so busy slaying Pakistanis that it loses sight of its core strengths." Divya Pal of News18 criticized the screenplay and direction of the film and gave the film a rating of 1.5 out of 5 saying that, "All in all, "The Ghazi Attack" is utterly disappointing."

== Awards and nominations ==
Year	Award	Category	Nominee	Result	Ref
3 May 2018	65th National Film Awards	Best Feature Film in Telugu	Ghazi	Won	
16 June 2018	65th Filmfare Awards South	Best Film – Telugu	PVP Cinema; Matinee Entertainment	Nominated	
16 June 2018	65th Filmfare Awards South	Best Director – Telugu	Sankalp Reddy	Nominated	
26 August 2018	16th Santosham Film Awards	Best Director	Sankalp Reddy	Won	
14–15 September 2018	7th South Indian International Movie Awards	Best Film (Telugu)	PVP Cinema; Matinee Entertainment	Nominated	
14–15 September 2018	7th South Indian International Movie Awards	Best Director (Telugu)	Sankalp Reddy	Nominated	
14–15 September 2018	7th South Indian International Movie Awards	Best Debut Director – Telugu	Sankalp Reddy	Nominated	
14–15 September 2018	7th South Indian International Movie Awards	Best Supporting Actor (Telugu)	Kay Kay Menon	Nominated	
14–15 September 2018	7th South Indian International Movie Awards	Entertainer of the Year	Rana Daggubati	Won	

== See also ==
- Raazi
