= IB71 =

2023 film by Sankalp Reddy

- Threatical release poster
- Directed by: Sankalp Reddy
- Written by: Sankalp Reddy
- Screenplay by: Story House Films LLP; Sankalp Reddy; Arjun Varma; E. Vasudeva Reddy; Arun Bhimavarapu; Nishpeksh Mehra; Gargee Singh; Abhimanyu Srivastava
- Dialogues by: Junaid Wasi; Sahar Quaze
- Story by: Aditya Shastri
- Produced by: Vidyut Jammwal; Abbas Sayyed; Reliance Entertainment; Bhushan Kumar; Krishan Kumar
- Starring: Vidyut Jammwal; Vishal Jethwa; Faizan Khan; Anupam Kher
- Cinematography: Gnana Shekar V. S.
- Edited by: Sandeep Francis
- Music by: Score: Prashanth R Vihari; Songs: Vikram Montrose
- Production companies: T-Series; Reliance Entertainment; Action Hero Films
- Distributed by: Reliance Entertainment; Action Hero Films Distribution; PVR Pictures; Phars Film
- Release date: 12 May 2023
- Running time: 117 minutes
- Country: India
- Language: Hindi
- Budget: ₹25 crore
- Box office: est.₹29.19 crore

IB71 is a 2023 Indian Hindi-language spy thriller film based on the 1971 Indian Airlines hijacking, written and directed by Sankalp Reddy. It stars Vidyut Jammwal, Vishal Jethwa and Faizan Khan, alongside Anupam Kher, Ashwath Bhatt, Danny Sura and Suvrat Joshi. IB71 is Jammwal's first film as a producer and was released on 12 May 2023 to mixed reviews from critics.

== Plot ==
In 1971, the Intelligence Bureau receives critical information from its agents in East Pakistan about Pakistan and China's launch of attacks on India within 10 days from bases in East Pakistan, with the aim of cutting off the North-east states from the rest of India. With limited time and resources, IB agent Dev tells his superior N.S. Avasti that the only way to counter this threat is by implementing an airspace blockade. This blockage would hamper movement of its air-fleet from West Pakistan to East Pakistan. Avasti, and the political superiors, deem it to be a violation of the Tashkent Agreement, and hence are reluctant. However, he persists by suggesting that the hijacking of an Indian plane by Kashmiri separatists and ensuring its landing in Pakistani territory can be used as a legitimate pretext to enforce a ban on the use of Indian airspace. Initially dismissed as an implausible scheme, the IB eventually recognizes its potential and agrees to execute a well-structured operation. Complications arise when the entire team of passengers, comprising intelligence officers, find themselves lodged in a Lahore hotel, where events unfold in unforeseen circumstances, thus deviating from the original plan.

== Cast ==
- Vidyut Jammwal as IB agent Dev Jammwal
- Anupam Kher as IB Chief N. S. Avasti (as based on M. M. L. Hooja)
- Vishal Jethwa as Qasim Qureshi (as based on Hashim Qureshi)
- Faizan Khan as Ashfaq Qureshi
- Danny Sura as Sikander
- Suvrat Joshi as IB agent Sangram Jadhav
- Ajay Dhansu as IB Officer
- Hobby Dhaliwal as Abdul Hamid Khan
- Ashwath Bhatt as ISI Chief Afsal Aga (as based on Mohammad Akbar Khan)
- Dalip Tahil as Zulfikar Ali Bhutto
- Shahnawaz Pradhan as Yahya Khan
- Mir Sarwar as SI J & K Police
- Naresh Malik as Maqbool Bhat
- Niharica Raizada as Air Hostess (IB agent)
- Bijay Anand as Flight Captain (IB agent )
- Sahidur Rahaman as Tapan Majumdar
- Pyarali Nayani as Shimla Station Manager
- Amit Anand Raut as Lahore police officer
- Rajat Roy as IB officer
- Narinder Bhutani as Indian agent passenger
- Shabana Khan as Sheela (Passenger)

== Production ==
Principal photography began in January 2022 in Mumbai. In March 2022 Kher joined the shoot.

== Music ==
The music of the film is composed by Vikram Montrose while background score is composed by Prashanth R Vihari.

Track listing
No.	Title	Lyrics	Singer(s)	Length
1.	"Vijayi Bhava"	Abhinav Shekhar	Shadaab Faridi	4:11

== Release ==
=== Theatrical ===
IB71 was theatrically released on 12 May 2023.

=== Home media ===
The film was premiered on Disney+ Hotstar from 7 July 2023.

== Reception ==
=== Critical response ===
On the review aggregator website Rotten Tomatoes, 14% of 7 critics' reviews are positive, with an average rating of 5/10.

Abhishek Srivastava of The Times of India gave 3.5 out of 5 stars and wrote "IB71 is an engaging watch that sheds light on a remarkable chapter of history, instilling a sense of pride in our intelligence network. With a runtime of nearly two hours, the film maintains a screenplay that keeps the audience captivated throughout, ensuring there is never a dull moment." Shaheen Irani of OTTplay gave 3.5 out of 5 stars and wrote "IB 71 is a good deal if you want an entertaining weekend watch. It is not the best film out there but for the most bits, it will leave you with a smile."

Monika Rawal Kukreja of Hindustan Times wrote "Aditya Shastri's story is intriguing and holds a lot of potential to keep you hooked. What doesn't really work is the screenplay for which six people are credited -- Sankalp Reddy, Arjun Varma, E. Vasudeva Reddy, Arun Bhimavarapu, Gargee Singh and Abhimanyu Srivastava. For the longest time, they looked like disjoined and scattered pieces of a puzzle. Even when the story is picking pace, there is very little or no connect with how it unfolds for audiences to understand." Vinamra Mathur of Firstpost gave 2.25 out of 5 stars and wrote "Vidyut Jammwal gives his brawn a rest and lets his brain do the talking in this mildly engrossing but otherwise trite thriller." Saibal Chatterjee of NDTV gave 2.5 out of 5 stars and wrote "IB71 leaves one with the nagging feeling that it could have been a much better film has the writing been a less of the by-the-numbers kind. But even as a middling spy drama, it is not without its moments."

Zinia Bandyopadhyay of India Today gave 2.5 out of 5 stars and wrote "Vidyut Jammwal's IB 71, which is based on true events, is an account of what happened during the Indo-Pak War of 1971. With a sluggish first half, followed by a thrilling second half, the film is a decent thriller." Shubhra Gupta of The Indian Express gave 1.5 out of 5 stars and wrote "This Vidyut Jammwal film IB71 claims to have been cobbled together from actual events, but the execution is both simplistic-comic-book and convoluted."

=== Box office ===
As of 29 June, the film collected ₹29.19 crore (equivalent to ₹32 crore or US$3.4 million in 2026).
