= Ghazi Shaheed =

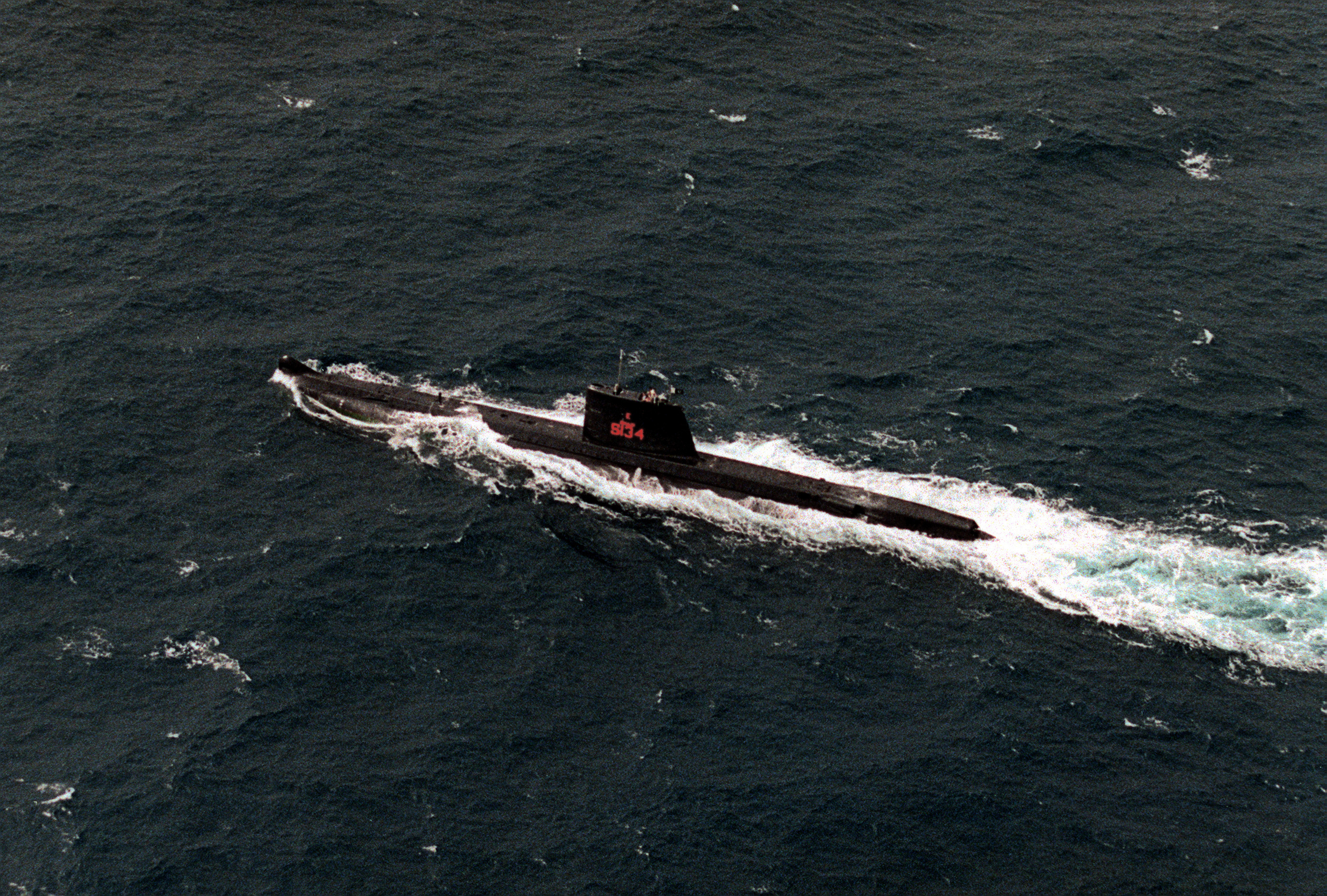
- PNS Ghazi (S-134) was used as a fictional Tench-class submarine.
- Directed by: Kazim Pasha
- Written by: Asad Mohammad Khan
- Produced by: Inter-Services Public Relations (ISPR)
- Starring: Shabbir Jan; Mishi Khan; Ayesha Khan; Humayun Saeed; Rizwan Wasti; Adnan Jilani
- Cinematography: Tanweer Malik
- Edited by: Ghulam Qadir Khan
- Music by: PTV Music
- Production company: PTV Studios
- Distributed by: Techno Time Production
- Release date: 6 September 1998 (Karachi)
- Running time: 120 minutes
- Country: Pakistan
- Language: Urdu

Ghazi Shaheed is a 1998 thriller drama film based on the disasters that befell the submarine PNS Ghazi in the Bay of Bengal. It was directed by Kazim Pasha and stars Shabbir Jan as Commander Zafar Khan and Adnan Jilani as Lieutenant-Commander Pervez Hameed. The film was financed and produced by the ISPR and the Pakistan Navy and was filmed mostly in the Arabian Sea.

== Synopsis ==
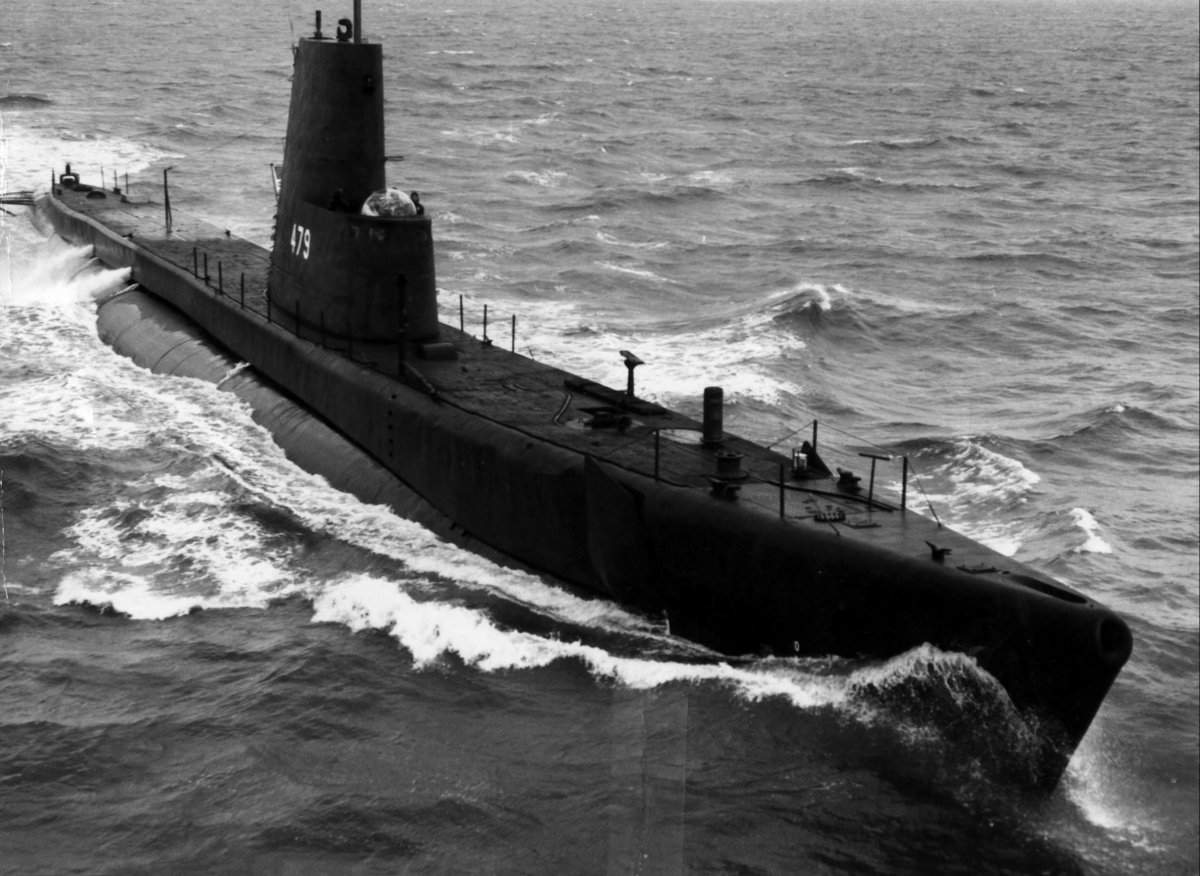
The Tench-class submarine in the U.S. Navy's service as Diablo in 1964.

This film revolves around the crew of PNS Ghazi, and the mysterious loss of the Tench-class submarine of Pakistan Navy nearby the Indian coast during the Indo-Pakistani War of 1971. It ventured into Indian waters to destroy INS Vikrant on the shores of Visakhapatnam. 92 men were killed while serving their country aboard PNS Ghazi, the first Pakistani submarine and also the only one at that time with a long range and the ability to lay mines.

== Cast ==
- Shabbir Jan as Commander Zafar Khan, Commanding Officer of the Ghazi, husband of Lala Rukh Zafar
- Mishi Khan as Lala Rukh Zafar, wife of Zafar Khan
- Mobina Dossel as Sitara Shamshad, wife of Lieutenant Commander Shamshad Ahmad
- Ayesha Khan as Phuppo
- Adnan Jilani as Lieutenant-Commander Pervez Hameed, husband of Begum Kalsoom Pervez
- Sadia Jilani as Begum Kalsoom Pervez, wife of Lieutenant-Commander Pervez Hameed
- Nassarullah as Lieutenant-Commander Shamshad Ahmad, husband of Sitara Shamshad
- Humayun Saeed as Lieutenant Muhammad Bashir Rajput
- Ghalib Kamal as Lieutenant Nazir Ahmed Awan
- Azra Siddiq as Shehla Nazir Awan, wife of Lt Nazir Ahmed Awan
- Faisal Qazi as CPO Lal Khan Satti
- Rizwan Wasti as Commodore KM Hussain
- Ebrahim Razh as Petty Officer Emanual, leading Torpedo Officer (TPO)
- Fehmid Ahmad Khan as Admiral S.M. Nanda, Indian Navy
- Mohammad Ayub as Rear Admiral R. Krishna
- Imtiaz Taj as Commodore G M Hiranandan
- Mohammad Imdad Khan as Captain Inder Singh

== See also ==
- ISPR Media Productions
