= Kachchi Sadak =

- Directed by: Sanjay D Singh
- Written by: Rahul Singh
- Produced by: Sanjay D Singh
- Starring: Rahul Singh; Parmita Katkar; Madhoo; Mukesh Tiwari; Amrish Puri; Rahul Dev; Mithun Chakraborty
- Cinematography: Karim Khatri
- Edited by: Vilas Ranade; Deepak Wirkud
- Music by: Uttam Singh
- Distributed by: Jia Entertainment Network Pvt. Ltd. Hinglaaj Mooviez India
- Release date: 15 September 2006
- Country: India
- Language: Hindi

Kachchi Sadak is a 2006 Indian Hindi-language action film directed by Sanjay D Singh, starring Rahul Singh, Parmita Katkar, Madhoo, Mukesh Tiwari, Amrish Puri, Rahul Dev and Mithun Chakraborty.

The story follows a boy named Randhir who becomes involved in the politically manipulated liquor trade. His only relief is his confidantes and girlfriend Julie. He is later asked to help an honest social-worker-turned-politician in the coming elections, but destiny has other plans. It's a part fiction part real story, written by Rahul Singh himself. The film is notable for being Amrish Puri's last film and for being shot in the same Jodhpur jail where Salman Khan was kept during the Black Buck case.

The film had a limited theatrical release on 15 September 2006. Opening on 20 screens, it was a box-office bomb.

== Cast ==
- Rahul Singh as Randhir Singh Choudhary
- Parmita Katkar as Julie
- Amrish Puri as Jailor Hasan Kairanvi
- Madhoo as Laxmi Devi
- Rahul Dev as Javed Ali
- Mukesh Tiwari as Shyamlal
- Aman Verma as Raghav Mehta
- Sharat Saxena as Hari Om Jaiswal
- Govind Namdeo as Jani Babu
- Tinu Anand as Anurag Khanna
- Reema Lagoo as Sumitra Devi
- Narendra Jha as Yaseen Khan
- Anant Jog as Paswan
- Bharat Bhushan as Ramnath Kapoor
- Jay Soni as Dharmesh
- Palak Jain as Anita
- Mithun Chakraborty as Qawali Singer Shankar at Ajmer Dargah

== Reception ==
Taran Adarsh from Bollywood Hungama gave the film 1 star out of 5, labeling the plot "outdated" and the overall product "low on content and also hype". However, he praised the action sequences and performances.
