= Victory at Sea Memorial =

War memorial in India

Victory at Sea
- సముద్రం వద్ద విజయం
- India
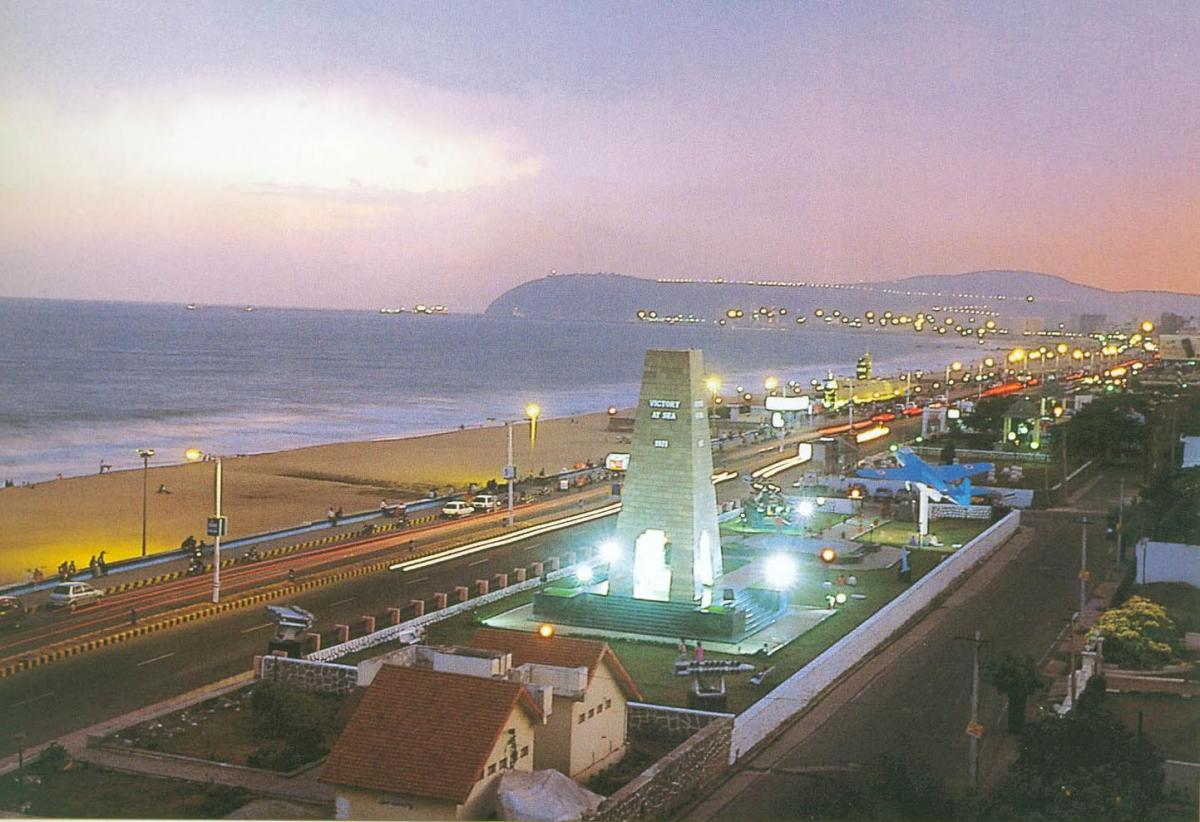
- For the Indian Navy
- Established: 10 December 1996
- Location: 17.7187°N 83.3322°E; Beach Road, Visakhapatnam
- Victory at Sea 1971

The Victory at Sea Memorial (Telugu: విక్టరీ ఎట్ సీ) is an Indian memorial constructed after the Indo-Pakistani War of 1971 which is dedicated to the Indian Navy and the Eastern Naval Command sailors. It was constructed in 1996. It is located on Beach Road, Visakhapatnam.

== History ==
In the 1971 liberation war in East Pakistan, the Pakistan Navy targeted the Visakhapatnam Port to destroy the Indian aircraft carrier INS Vikrant but the Indian Navy sunk the Pakistani submarine PNS Ghazi at the coast of Visakhapatnam and took the first battle victory in that war.
