= Sajjangarh Wildlife Sanctuary =

Protected area in Rajasthan, India

- IUCN category IV (habitat/species management area)
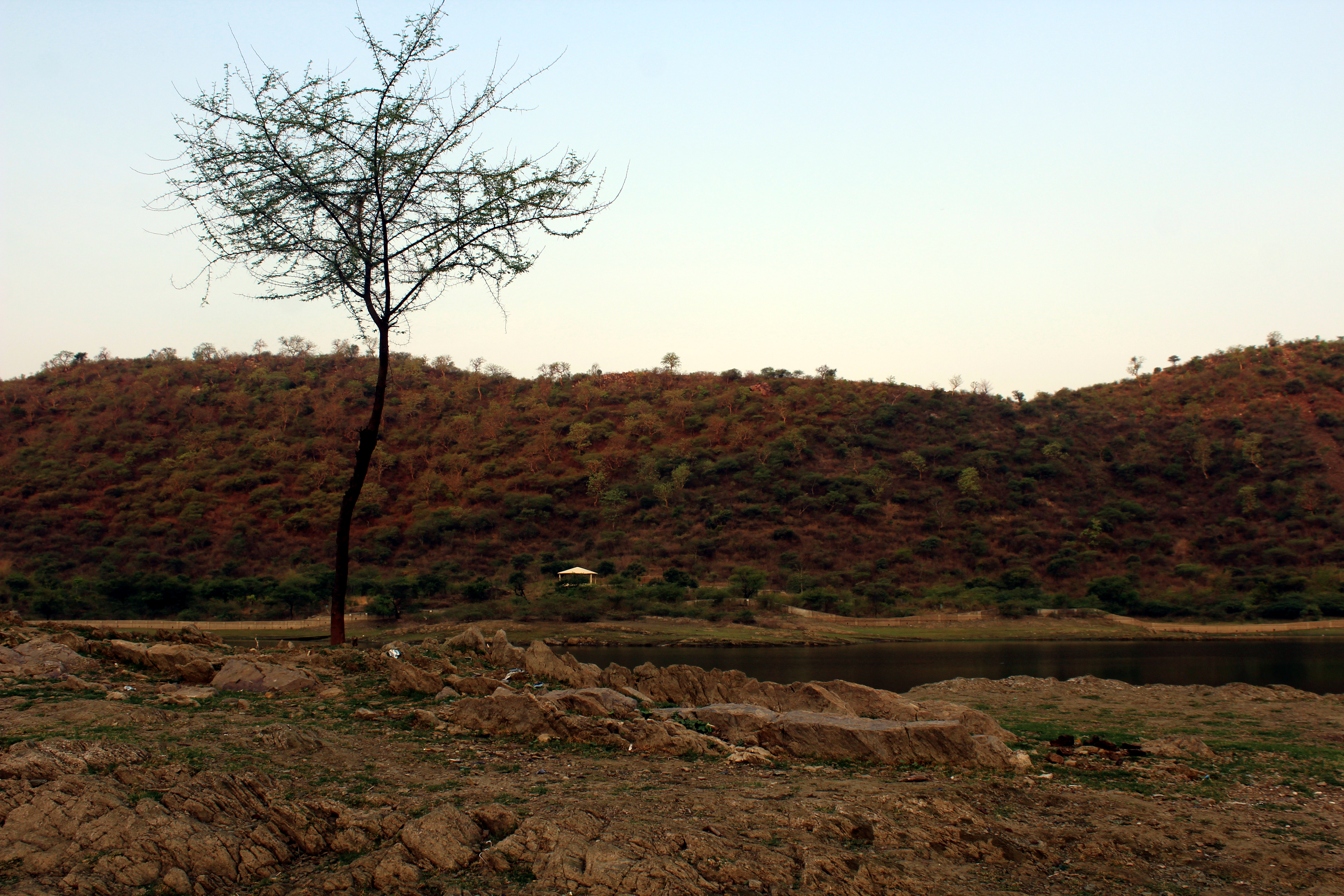
- Sajjangarh Wildlife Sanctuary

- Location within Rajasthan Location within India
- Interactive map of Sajjangarh Wildlife Sanctuary
- Location: Girwa tehsil, Udaipur district, Rajasthan, India
- Nearest city: Udaipur, Rajasthan
- Coordinates: 24°35′49″N 73°38′26″E
- Area: 5.19 km^{2} (2.00 sq mi)
- Governing body: Rajasthan State Forest Department

Sajjangarh Wildlife Sanctuary is located in Udaipur District of Rajasthan in the southern Aravalli Hills. The area of the sanctuary is 5.19 square kilometres. The sanctuary is located entirely within Girwa Tehsil of Udaipur district.

The sanctuary is situated atop Bansdara Hill in the most vulnerable habitat of the Aravallis, one of the oldest geological formations in the world. Unfortunately, the Aravallis' biological and non-biological resources have been overused and carelessly harnessed in the sake of rapid development that has gone well beyond sustainable levels, leaving the Bansdara Hills in a very hazardous state. The average temperature in summers can reach up to 42 °C, while the minimum temperature in winters is only about 6 °C. Generally, the humidity is low.

The area has irregular and unequal rainfall. An average of 650 millimeters of rain fall there each year.

== History ==
The area constituted the hunting grounds surrounding the Monsoon Palace, used by the Maharanas of Udaipur in the late 19th and early 20th centuries.

The area was made a wildlife sanctuary in 1987. In 2017, an area of 28.7 square kilometres around the boundary of the sanctuary was declared to be an Eco-Sensitive Zone by the Government of India.

== Flora and Fauna ==
Sajjangarh Wildlife Sanctuary is the smallest of Rajasthan's 25 wildlife preserves, the country's largest state by land size. It is barely 5 km from the city of Udaipur and covers an area of 5.19 km2, with only one block covered by forest.

Bird Diversity

The sanctuary is home to 129 different bird species, including both terrestrial and aquatic species. In the terrestrial category, there were 33 families, 62 genera, and 91 species listed. Eight are winter migrants, two are passage migrants, and eighty-one live in the sanctuary, according to local status. Despite being the smallest sanctuary in Rajasthan, Sajjangarh Wildlife Sanctuary is home to several endangered species that fall into various classifications as per IUCN 2008. Sarcogyps calvus, Gyps indicus, and Gyps bengalensis, three of the identified vulture species, are classified as severely endangered, while Neophron percnopterus is classified as endangered (Bhatnagar et al. 2011, Zoo's Print). White-naped Tis Parus nuchalis is important species found in the sanctuary as it is one of the arid specialists endemic species in India.
