= Aditya Shastri =

Indian academic (1963–2021)

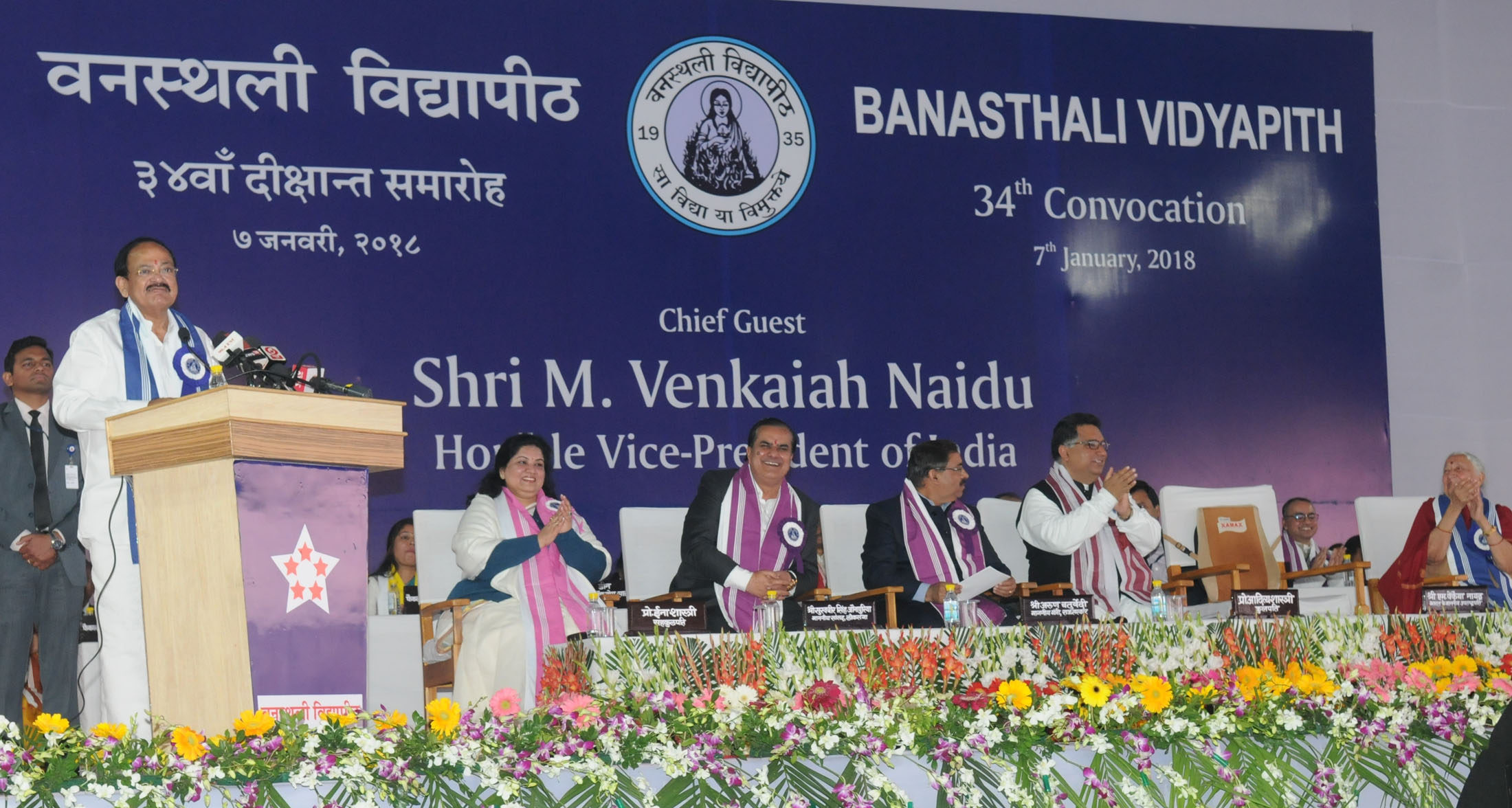
- Aditya Shastri on 7 January 2018 with the Vice President, Shri M. Venkaiah Naidu addressing the gathering during the 34th Convocation of the Banasthali Vidyapith, in Tonk district of Rajasthan

Vice Chancellor, Banasthali University

Vice Chancellor (President)

Personal details
- Born: Aditya
- Spouse: Ina Shastri
- Children: Anshuman and Late Ishan ( Died on 7 June 2021)
- Parent(s): Diwakar Shastri, Shakuntala Shashtri
- Education: Birla Institute of Technology and Science, Pilani
- Occupation: Professor, Vice-Chancellor
- Profession: Teaching, Administration

Aditya Shastri (4 June 1963 – 24 May 2021) was an Indian academic. He was the vice-chancellor of Banasthali Vidyapith (Banasthali University), a private university located in the Tonk district of the Indian state of Rajasthan. He was dearly loved and respected among the students and thus, was always titled as 'Aditya Bhaiya'. He was the grandson of Hiralal Shastri, first chief minister of state of Rajasthan.

== Biography ==
Shastri completed his graduation from Birla Institute of Technology and Science, Pilani and went to the US for master's from the State University of New York, Stony Brook. He completed his PhD from Massachusetts Institute of Technology (MIT) in 1990. Shastri was in the Governing Council of the Association of Indian Universities (AIU). He served for one year at the Tata Institute of Fundamental Research (TIFR). Later, he moved to Banasthali where he has remained until his death.

He died due to post-COVID-19 effects on 24 May 2021, during the COVID-19 pandemic in India.

== Works ==
He has authored five textbooks and published over 50 research papers. He has generated more than US$10 million in grants for Banasthali.
