= Pakistan Navy Northern Command =

- Insignia
- Active: 15 Mar 1974 - Present
- Country: Pakistan
- Branch: Pakistan Navy
- Headquarters: HQ COMNOR Naval Complex, Islamabad
- Nicknames: COMNOR; North Navy
- Engagements: 1965 Indo-Pak war 1971 Indo-Pak war

The Northern Naval Command (reporting name: COMNOR), is military command of Pakistan Navy in the Northern Pakistan usually held by a senior officer of Commodore rank. It is currently headquartered in headquarters Commander North which served its regional headquarters and is currently stationed at Naval Complex Islamabad.Commander North reports to Deputy Chief of the Naval Staff, Administration (DCNS-A) at NHQ of its respected command from where COMNOR is also directed and instructed by the Principal Staff Officers (PSOs) of three-star rank and two-star rank Admirals functioning under the Chief of the Naval Staff. COMNOR command is one of the most junior admin authority offshore and in the field and its job is to implement the policies issued by the Principle Staff Officers of three-star and two-star rank Admirals operating from NHQ.

The COMNOR mandate and area of responsibility (AOR) includes the defense of northern contingent of the country and the ensure requisite growth and military advancement to protect the strategic areas in northern contingent. The northern command jointly works with Northern Military Command of Pakistan Army. The northern command also provides administrative and combat support in its AOR through PNS ZAFAR as its regional headquarters and PNS Hafeez as its military hospital. The northern command operates NSU operatives to provide intelligence management and security for the northern contingent.
