= Albacora-class submarine =

Submarine class of the Portuguese Navy

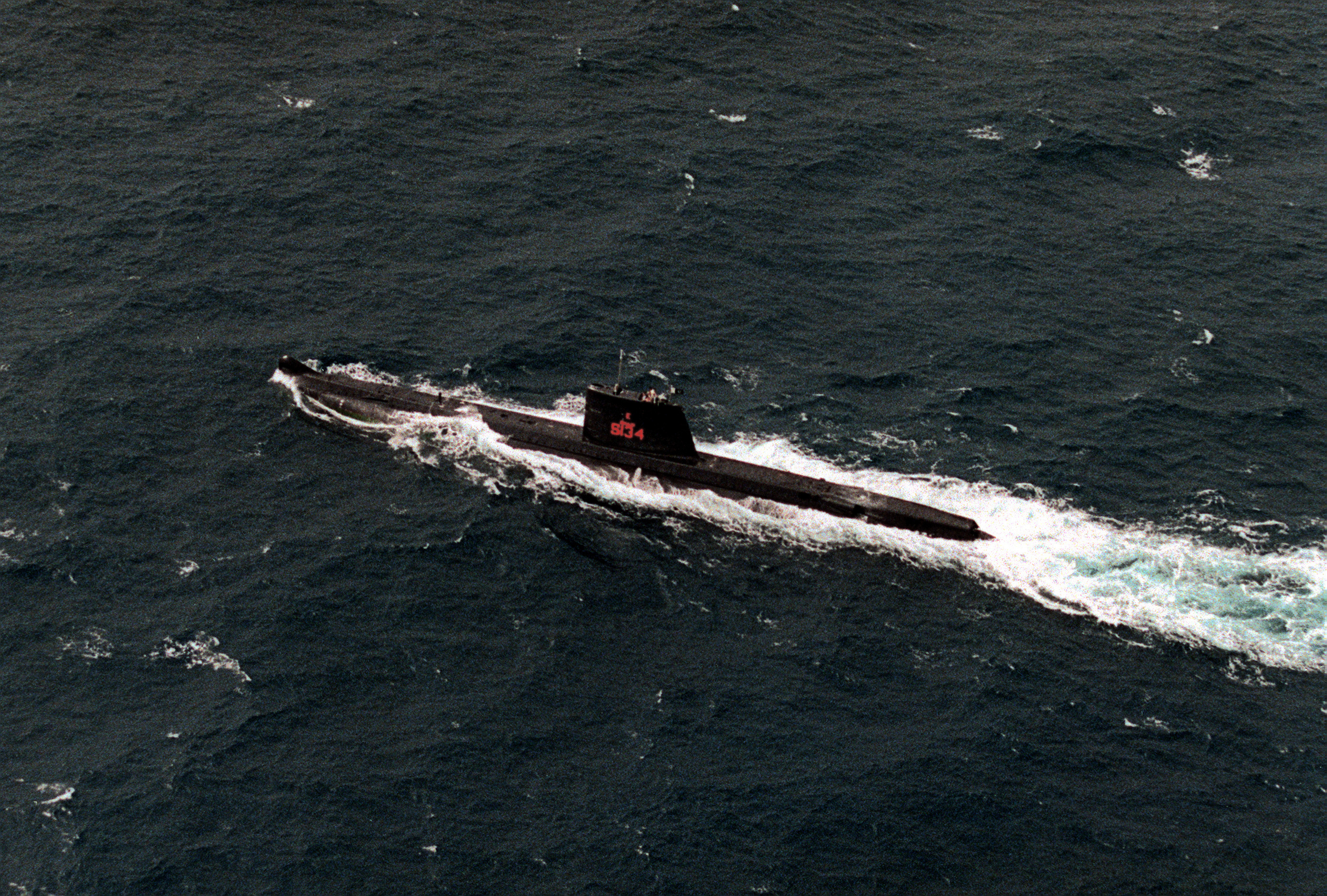
- Albacora-class submarine Ghazi (S-134), former Portuguese Navy Cachalote (S-165)

Class overview
- Name: Albacora
- Builders: Ateliers Dubigeòn-Normándie
- Operators: Portuguese Navy; Pakistan Navy
- Preceded by: Neptuno class
- Succeeded by: Tridente class
- In commission: 1967–2010
- Completed: 4
- Retired: 4
- Preserved: 1

General characteristics
- Type: Submarine
- Displacement: 860 tons surfaced; 1,043 tons submerged
- Length: 57.8 m (189.6 ft)
- Beam: 6.8 m (22.3 ft)
- Draught: 5.2 m (17.1 ft)
- Propulsion: Diesel-electric, two shafts, 2,450Cv/Hp; 2 × SEMT Pielstick (12 PA4 185); 2 × AREVA electric alternate
- Speed: Submerged: 16 knots (30 km/h); Surfaced: 13.5 knots (25.0 km/h)
- Range: Surfaced: 2,700 nmi (5,000 km) at 12 knots (22 km/h)
- Complement: 54
- Armament: 12 × 21.7 in (551 mm) DaphneTT-550 torpedo tubes (8 bow, 4 stern), 12 torpedoes

The Albacora class was a diesel-electric attack submarine (SSK) developed for the Portuguese Navy based on the French Daphné class.

In 1964, the Portuguese government ordered the construction of four of this class at the Dubigeòn-Normándie Shipyard to create the 4th Submarine Flotilla.

With the first submarine commissioned on 1 October 1967, the Portuguese Navy started to have a submarine able to operate in both coastal and oceanic zones, especially in the Portuguese exclusive economic zone.

The last Albacora-class submarine in service, NRP Barracuda, made its final mission in 2010. The class was replaced by two Type 209PN/Type 214PN submarines.

== Ships ==
Country	Pennant	Name	Completed	Commissioned	Decommissioned
Pakistan Navy	S134	PNS Ghazi (former NRP Cachalote)	1969	Acquired 1975	2006
Portuguese Navy	S163	NRP Albacora	1967	1 October 1967	2000
Portuguese Navy	S164	NRP Barracuda	1968	4 May 1968	2010
Portuguese Navy	S165	NRP Cachalote	1969	25 January 1969	1975 (Transferred)
Portuguese Navy	S166	NRP Delfim	1969	1 October 1969	2005

== See also ==
Equivalent submarines of the same era

- Type 206
- Heroj class
- Toti class
- Natsushio class
