= Zafar Muhammad Khan =

Pakistani naval captain

Commander Zafar Muhammad Khan HJ SJ
- Commander Zafar M. Khan, 1965.
- Born: Zafar Muhammad Khan; Karachi, Sindh, British India
- Died: 4 December 1971; Visakhapatnam (Bay of Bengal), India
- Military career
- Allegiance: Pakistan
- Branch: Pakistan Navy
- Service years: 1956-1971
- Rank: Commander
- Nickname: Commander Zafar
- Service number: PN No. 643
- Unit: Submarine Service Branch
- Commands: PNS Ghazi Submarine
- Conflicts: Indo-Pakistani War of 1965; Operation Dwarka; Indo-Pakistani War of 1971; Operation Falcon †
- Awards: Sitara-e-Jurat (1965); Hilal-i-Jur'at (1971)

Zafar Muhammad Khan (death: 4 December 1971) was a Pakistani naval officer who was the captain and commanding officer of the PNS Ghazi submarine during the Indo-Pakistani War of 1971. The PNS Ghazi was on a reconnaissance mine-laying mission in the approaches to the Indian port of Visakhapatnam (Bay of Bengal) when it sank under mysterious circumstances on 4 December at about 00:10 hours. A total of 93 men, including 11 commissioned officers, and 82 non-commissioned officers lost their lives. In 1971, he was one of the naval officers who were posthumously awarded the Hilal-i-Jur'at for their actions.

== Naval career ==
Prior to her deployment, Ghazi continued to experience equipment failures and reportedly had aging issues. Since it was the only submarine of the Pakistan Navy and had the range and capability to undertake operations in the distant waters controlled by India, Ghazi was pressed into operation to destroy or damage the aircraft carrier, INS Vikrant, of the Indian navy. On 14 November 1971, she quietly sailed 3,000 miles (4,800 km) around the Indian peninsula from the Arabian Sea to the Bay of Bengal under the command of Zafar Muhammad who was commanding a submarine for the first time, with 10 officers and 82 sailors. Ghazi was on a two-fold mission: the primary goal was to locate and sink Vikrant and secondary was to mine India's eastern seaboard which was to be fulfilled independently of the accomplishment of the first.

The PNS Ghazi had achieved the first objectives by laying the mines. On 23 November, as part of her second assignment, PNS Ghazi began to look for INS Vikrant. The mysterious sinking of Ghazi took place on 4 December 1971 during its hunt to find INS Vikrant and/or during the minelaying mission on the Visakhapatnam Port, Bay of Bengal. The cause of the sinking is still unknown, and Indian and Pakistani sources have offered differing accounts. Indian officials claim that Indian navy was responsible for sinking of PNS Ghazi. However, both the neutral sources and Indian military officials have rejected the Indian version on sinking of PNS Ghazi. Pakistani officials state that PNS Ghazi suffered an internal explosion while it was laying mines. The internal explosion was the cause of sinking of the submarine.

In 2003, the Indian Navy again sent its divers to oversee its investigation and the divers recovered some items, including the war logs, officials backup tapes from her computers, and mission files that were displaced in Eastern Naval Command of Indian Navy, but the divers who studied the wreckage confirmed that the submarine must have suffered an internal explosion which blew up its mines and torpedoes. Another theory suggests an explosion of hydrogen gas which violently built up inside the submarine while its batteries were being charged underwater.

In 2010, Lieutenant-General J.F.R Jacob of Eastern Command mentioned in an article that "Ghazi was destroyed in an accident in which Indian Navy was not involved. There were many opinions from authors of the Indian side who also shared this skepticism of the Indian Navy’s official stance."

In 2010, it was reported that Indian navy had destroyed all records of sinking Ghazi submarine. Vice admiral G M Hiranandani who was tasked with writing the official history of the navy. He stated that he was unable to obtain any old files regarding PNS Ghazi sinking. Those old files were destroyed. One of the retired navy officers who saw action in 1971 claims that the destruction of the Ghazi papers and those of army in Kolkata depicts the many instances when Indian war history has been delibarelty falsified. He further stated that 'We have enough heroes. In fog of war, many myth and false hero may have been created and many left unsung'.

== Media ==
The Pakistan Navy has paid tribute to Commander Zafar and the crew of PNS Ghazi by establishing monuments of the fallen officers. In 1996, a dramatization of PNS Ghazi, as PNS Ghazi (Shaheed), was filmed, and it was financed and produced by ISPR of the Pakistan Defense Forces. It was here that the Pakistan Navy first outlined the naval career of Commander Zafar Muhammad Khan and other officers. A well-known Pakistani actor, Shabbir Jan, portrayed the life and career of Commander Zafar Muhammad Khan.
