= List of active South African Navy ships =

Ensign of the South African Navy

The South African Navy (SA Navy) fleet consists of approximately 60 commissioned vessels as of 2026. Its core combat capability is centred on four stealth guided-missile frigates and three diesel-electric attack submarines. Amphibious and support capability is provided by a combat support ship, a hydrographic survey vessel, mine countermeasure vessels, and a growing fleet of inshore and offshore patrol vessels, supported by harbour and seagoing tugs. Numerous smaller auxiliaries and craft, including rigid-hulled inflatable boats (RHIBs), also remain in service but are not listed.

The SA Navy has operated six submarines and nine strike craft throughout its history. The three Daphné-class submarines were retired during the early 2000s following the introduction of the Heroine class, while the Warrior-class strike craft, which served as the Navy's principal surface combatants during the late apartheid era, were gradually withdrawn from frontline service following the commissioning of the Valour-class frigates.

The majority of the fleet is based at Naval Base Simon's Town near Cape Town in the Western Cape, which serves as the Navy's headquarters, principal dockyard and main operational base. Naval Base Durban functions as a forward-operating facility for patrol vessels and mine warfare units.

== Submarines ==
=== Heroine class ===
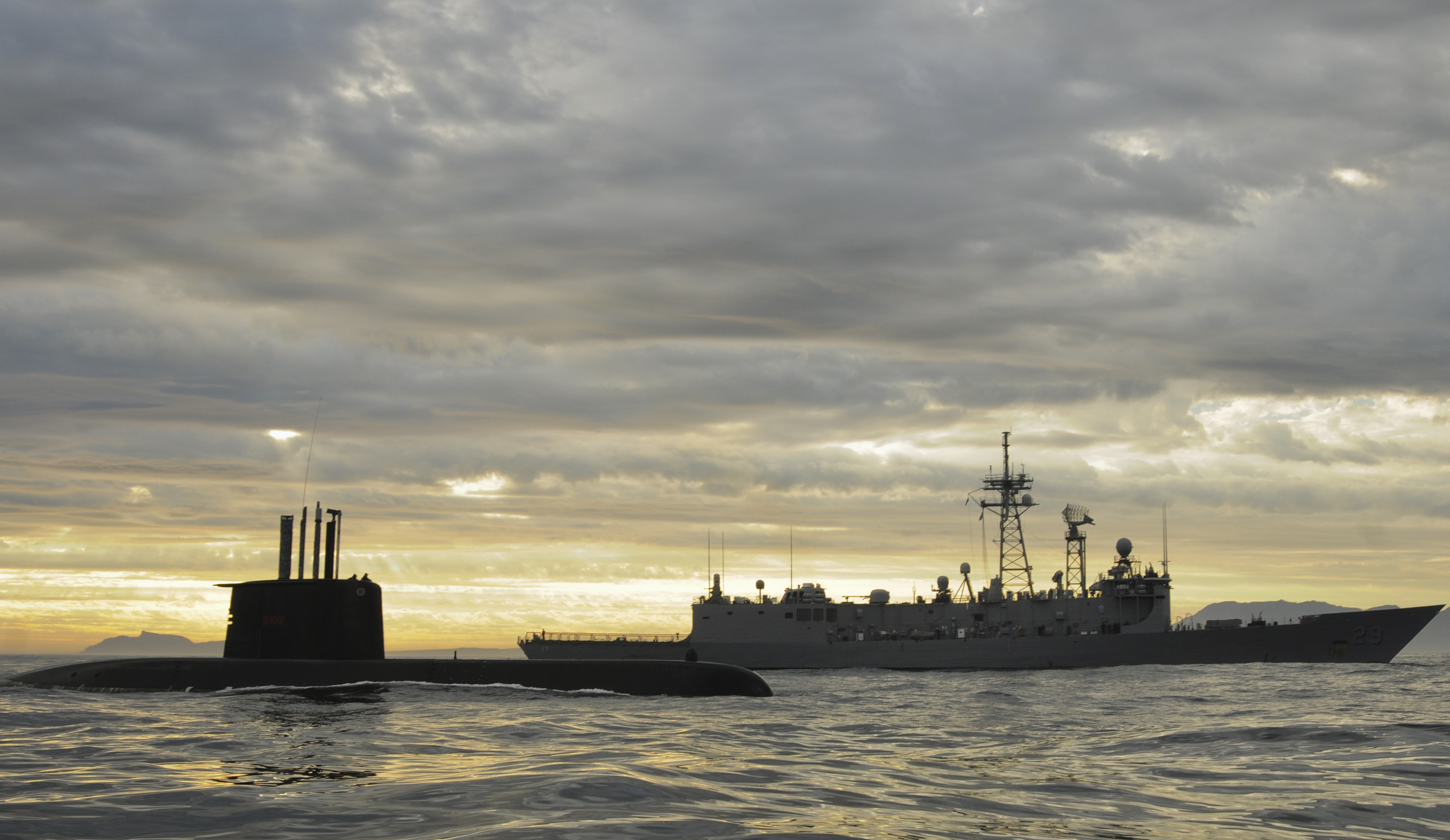
Heroine-class submarine SAS Charlotte Maxeke alongside the U.S. Navy Oliver Hazard Perry-class frigate USS Stephen W. Groves during a joint naval exercise

South Africa operates a single class of diesel-electric attack submarines, the Heroine class, comprising three boats commissioned between 2005 and 2008. Based on the German Type 209/1400MOD design, the submarines were constructed by Howaldtswerke-Deutsche Werft (HDW) and Thyssen Nordseewerke in Germany to meet South African Navy requirements. Acquired under Project Wills as part of the Strategic Defence Package, they replaced the ageing French-built Daphné-class submarines and restored South Africa's submarine capability. Their introduction made South Africa one of only three African nations, alongside Algeria and Egypt, to operate an active submarine fleet, and the only country in sub-Saharan Africa with an operational submarine arm.

Designed as highly capable hunter-killer submarines (SSKs), the Heroine class provides the SA Navy with anti-surface, anti-submarine and intelligence-gathering capabilities, while also supporting special forces insertion, covert surveillance and maritime reconnaissance. Each submarine is fitted with eight 533 mm bow torpedo tubes capable of carrying up to 14 Atlas Elektronik SUT 264 heavyweight torpedoes or optional UGM-84 Sub-Harpoon anti-ship missiles, although the latter capability has never been introduced into service. Equipped with advanced sonar, electronic warfare and combat management systems, the class is optimised for stealth, long-endurance patrols and operations across the Atlantic and Indian Oceans.

The submarines are currently undergoing phased refits and life-extension work following years of deferred maintenance, with work on SAS Charlotte Maxeke and SAS Queen Modjadji commencing in late 2025 under the SA Navy's long-delayed submarine sustainment programme. All three vessels are expected to remain in service until around 2038–2040, although no formal successor programme has yet been announced. Despite ongoing funding constraints, the Heroine class remains the most strategically significant capability in the SA Navy, providing South Africa with the only submarine force in sub-Saharan Africa.

Origin: Germany

Size	Performance	Armament	Other features
Displacement: 1450 t surfaced 1600 t submerged Length: 62 metres (203 ft) Complement: 30	Submerged speed: 21.5 knots (39.8 km/h; 24.7 mph) Surfaced speed: 10 knots (19 km/h; 12 mph) Surfaced range: 11,000 nautical miles (20,000 km; 13,000 mi) Submerged range: 400 nautical miles (740 km; 460 mi)	8 × 533 mm bow torpedo tubes for up to 14 AEG SUT 264 heavyweight torpedoes	Sonar: CSU 90 Radar: Surface search I-band Periscope: SERO 400, OMS 100

Name	Pennant number	Commissioned	Homeport	Notes
SAS Manthatisi	S101	3 November 2005	Naval Base Simon's Town	
SAS Charlotte Maxeke	S102	14 March, 2007	Naval Base Simon's Town	
SAS Queen Modjadji	S103	22 May 2008	Naval Base Simon's Town	

== Frigates ==
=== Valour class ===
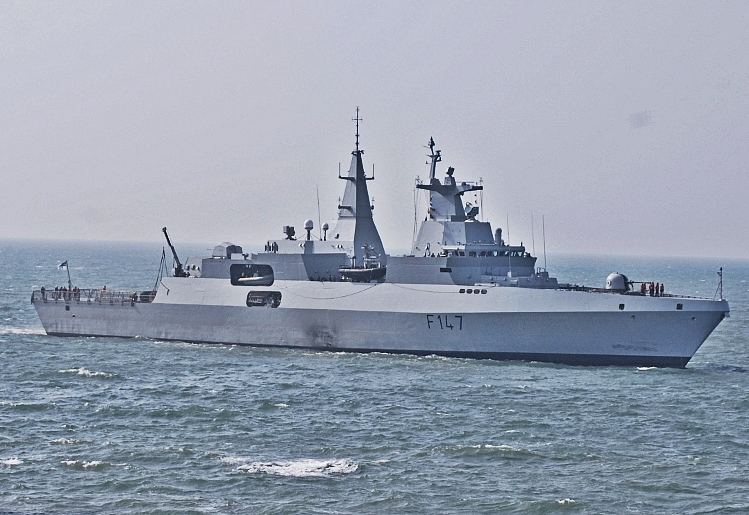
Valour-class frigate SAS Spioenkop during Exercise IBSAMAR V

South Africa operates a single class of stealth guided-missile frigates, the Valour class, comprising four vessels commissioned between 2006 and 2007. Based on the German MEKO A-200SAN design, the ships were constructed by Blohm+Voss in Hamburg, with final assembly and fitting-out completed in Durban. Acquired under Project Sitron as part of the Strategic Defence Package, the programme restored a blue-water surface combat capability that had effectively lapsed following the retirement of the President-class frigates. Although the Spanish Bazán 59B design initially ranked highest during the evaluation process, it was considered larger and more expensive than required, and the Navy selected the smaller MEKO design to preserve funding for Project Wills, the submarine acquisition programme.

With a standard displacement of approximately 3,590 tonnes and a full-load displacement of approximately 3,700 tonnes, the Valour class is the largest and most capable class of surface combatant ever operated by the SA Navy. Designed as highly survivable multi-role warships, the class incorporates extensive stealth features to reduce radar and infrared signatures, while its modular construction simplifies maintenance and future upgrades. The frigates are equipped for anti-surface, anti-air and anti-submarine warfare. The flight deck and hangar can accommodate up to two Super Lynx 300 helicopters or one Oryx medium utility helicopter, while the ships can also operate two rigid-hulled inflatable boats (RHIBs) for boarding and maritime security operations. A proposal to integrate unmanned aerial vehicles (UAVs) for enhanced surveillance and reconnaissance was later sidelined due to budget constraints.

Originally planned as a five-ship programme, the acquisition was reduced to four vessels because of budget constraints. The class is currently undergoing phased refits and capability upgrades under Project Syne, the South African Navy's long-term frigate modernisation programme, intended to extend operational service into the 2030s. Additional proposals, including upgraded Umkhonto missiles, UAV integration, a larger-calibre main gun, and BrahMos supersonic anti-ship missiles, have periodically been considered but remain unfunded. Despite these limitations, the Valour class remains the most capable surface combatant in sub-Saharan Africa and forms the backbone of South Africa's blue-water naval capability.

Origin: Germany

Size	Performance	Armament	Other features
Displacement: 3,700 t full load Length: 107.3 metres (352 ft) Complement: 152 (including aircrew)	Maximum speed: 30 knots (56 km/h; 35 mph) Range: 8,000 nautical miles (15,000 km; 9,200 mi)	4 × 8-cell VLS for up to 32 Umkhonto-IR Block 2 surface-to-air missiles 2 × 4-cell launchers for up to 8 Exocet MM40 Block 2 anti-ship missiles 4 × 324 mm torpedo tubes 1 × OTO Melara 76/62 mm Super Rapid gun 1 × Denel 35 mm CIWS 2 × Oerlikon 20 mm GAM-BO1 autocannons 2 × Reutech Rogue 12.7 mm remote weapon stations	Aviation: 1 × Super Lynx 300 Vehicles: 2 × RHIBs (rigid hull inflatable boats) Radar: Thales Naval France MRR-3D NG G-band multi-role radar Sonar: Thales UMS4132 Kingklip sonar Electronic warfare: Saab Grintek SME 100/200 ESM (Intercept and Jammer) & ELINT Decoys: 2 × Saab Grintek Super Barricade chaff launchers (48 decoy rounds per launcher; 96 rounds total)

Name	Pennant number	Commissioned	Homeport	Notes
SAS Amatola	F145	16 February 2006	Naval Base Simon's Town	
SAS Isandlwana	F146	20 July 2006	Naval Base Simon's Town	
SAS Spioenkop	F147	17 February 2007	Naval Base Simon's Town	
SAS Mendi	F148	20 March 2007	Naval Base Simon's Town	

== Patrol and defence ==
=== Warrior class ===
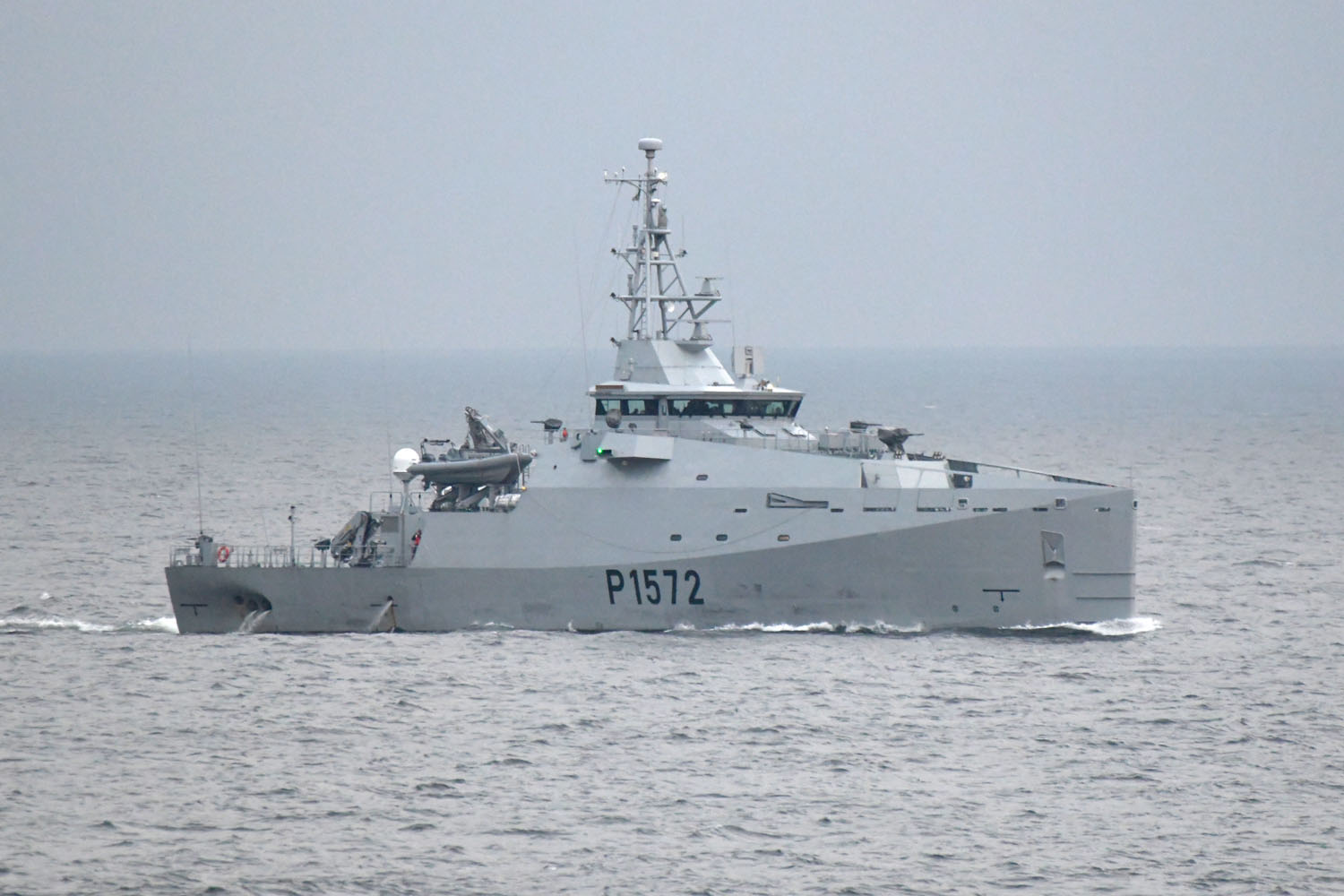
Warrior-class Multi-Mission Inshore Patrol Vessel (MMIPV) SAS King Shaka Zulu

The Warrior-class Multi-Mission Inshore Patrol Vessels (MMIPV) are the newest surface combatants in the SA Navy, introduced to enhance maritime security within the country's Exclusive Economic Zone. Built under Project Biro by Damen Shipyards Cape Town, the vessels feature a modern, modular design optimised for patrol, interdiction, and low-intensity operations in littoral waters. The class was conceived to succeed the ageing Warrior-class missile strike craft while providing a flexible platform capable of performing a wide range of peacetime and contingency operations.

These multi-role vessels support mine countermeasures, search and rescue, submarine torpedo recovery, humanitarian assistance, and anti-pollution operations, while also performing constabulary missions such as intercepting illegal trafficking, combating illegal fishing, and counter-piracy. Their modular design allows for containerised mission modules, enabling rapid adaptation for specialised tasks, including mine warfare, with facilities to carry one 20-foot or four 10-foot containers. Each ship is equipped with a 20 mm Reutech Super Rogue remotely operated cannon, heavy machine guns, advanced Reutech RTS 3200 radar/optronics systems, and Link-ZA compatible communications suites, while rigid-hull inflatable boats (RHIBs) extend their boarding and interdiction capabilities.

Three vessels — SAS Sekhukhune I, SAS King Shaka Zulu, and SAS Adam Kok III — were delivered between 2022 and 2024. Despite this, the Navy's Blue Print Force plan calls for at least 15 inshore and offshore patrol vessels to fully safeguard South Africa's maritime interests. Future expansion may include additional MMIPVs and larger offshore patrol vessels (MMOPVs), alongside a replacement for the ageing replenishment ship SAS Drakensberg. The Warrior-class MMIPVs thus represent a flexible, multi-mission platform central to South Africa's maritime security and the protection of its marine resources and economic zones.

Origin: South Africa

Size	Performance	Armament	Other features
Displacement: 1,000 t Length: 62 metres (203 ft) Complement: 62	Maximum speed: 26.5 knots (49.1 km/h; 30.5 mph) Range: 4,000 nautical miles (7,400 km; 4,600 mi)	1 × 20 mm Reutech Super Rogue autocannon 2 × 12.7 mm heavy machine guns	1 × 9 m (30 ft) RHIB (rigid hull inflatable boat) 1 x 7 m (23 ft) RHIB (rigid hull inflatable boat)

Name	Pennant number	Commissioned	Homeport	Notes
SAS King Sekhukhune I	P1571	15 June 2022	Naval Base Durban	
SAS King Shaka Zulu	P1572	24 April 2025	Naval Base Durban	
SAS Adam Kok III	P1573	25 April 2025	Naval Base Durban	

=== Warrior class strike craft ===
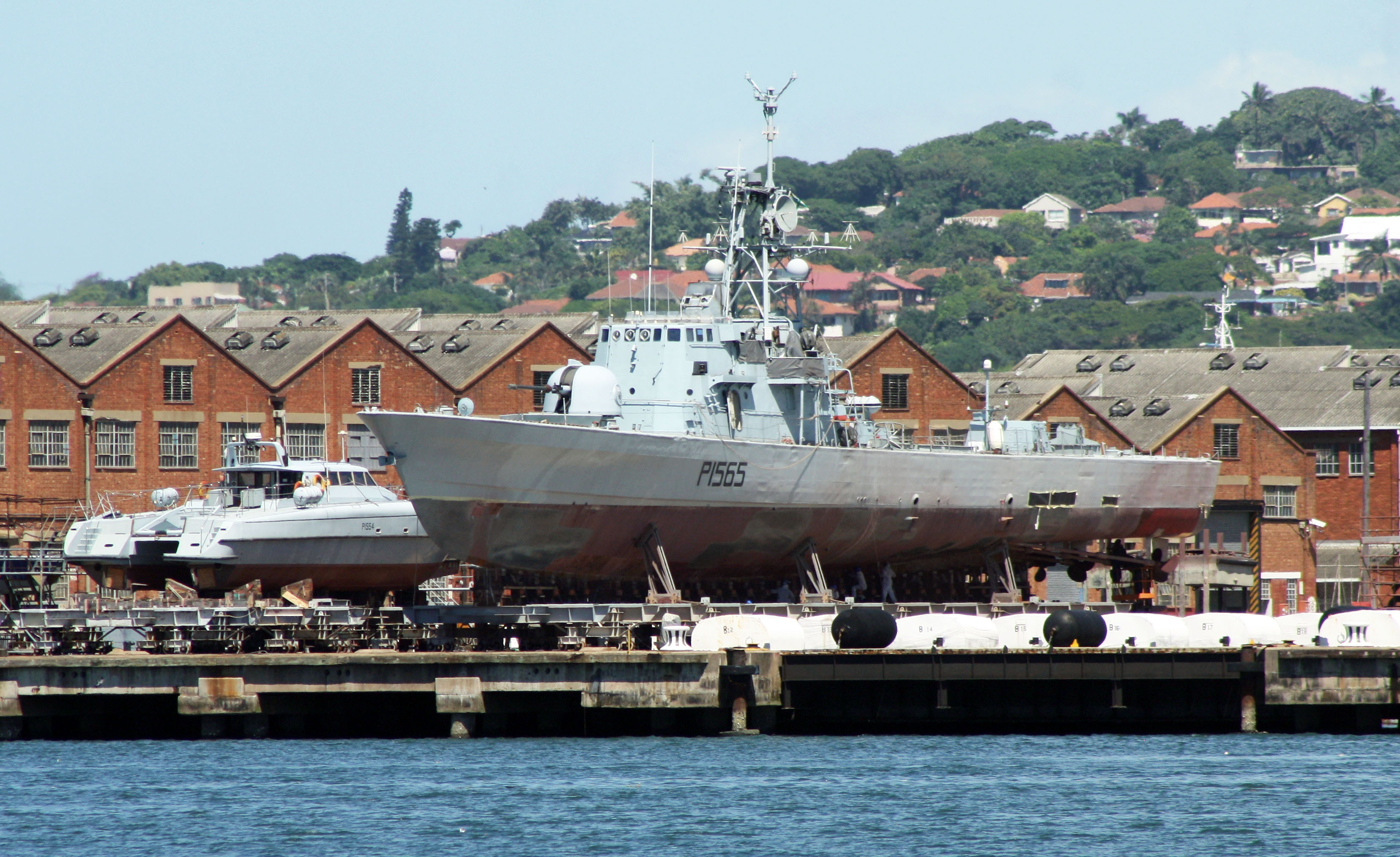
Warrior-class strike craft SAS Isaac Dyobha before retirement

The Warrior-class strike craft were the backbone of the SA Navy's fast attack capability from the late 1970s into the early 21st century. A total of nine vessels were constructed, with three built in Israel and the remaining six completed at Sandock-Austral in Durban. Based on the Israeli Reshef-class (Sa'ar 4) design, the ships were acquired under Project Japonica to provide a compact, fast, and heavily armed platform capable of coastal defence and sea control. Their introduction allowed the Navy to deliver credible strike capability cost-effectively during the South African Border War and the subsequent democratic era.

The Warrior-class vessels were armed with Gabriel 2 anti-ship missiles, a 76 mm OTO Melara naval gun, a pair of 20 mm Oerlikon autocannons, and additional heavy machine guns, giving them significant anti-surface firepower for their size. Their design emphasised high speed, manoeuvrability, and striking power, enabling operations as fast attack missile craft (FAC-M) in coastal waters. They were also capable of supporting special operations, most notably during Operation Kerslig in 1981, when strike craft deployed reconnaissance and demolition teams off the coast of Luanda, Angola, demonstrating the vessels long-range strike and covert operational capabilities.

Although highly capable during their operational peak, the class became increasingly obsolete in the 21st century. Eight of the nine vessels were retired, with six sold for scrap or sunk as target ships and two retained in reserve. Only one remains nominally commissioned while being gradually replaced by the Warrior-class MMIPVs under Project Biro. Despite budget constraints and the gradual phase-out, the Warrior-class strike craft are remembered as some of the most formidable small surface combatants ever operated in sub-Saharan Africa, and their legacy continues in the naming of the new multi-mission patrol vessels.

Origin: Israel / South Africa

Size	Performance	Armament	Other features
Displacement: 450 t Length: 62.2 metres (204 ft) Complement: 52	Maximum speed: 34 knots (63 km/h; 39 mph) Range: 3,000 nautical miles (5,600 km; 3,500 mi)	2 × 3-cell launchers for up to 6 Skerpioen (Gabriel Mk 2) anti-ship missiles 1 × OTO Melara 76/62 mm compact gun 2 × 12.7 mm heavy machine guns 2 × Oerlikon 20 mm GAM-BO1 autocannons	1 × RHIB (rigid hull inflatable boat)

Name	Pennant number	Commissioned	Homeport	Notes
SAS Makhanda	P1569	4 July 1986 – present	Naval Base Durban	Active
SAS Galeshewe	P1567	11 February 1983 – 2020	Naval Base Durban	In reserve
SAS Isaac Dyobha	P1565	27 July 1979 – 2022	Naval Base Durban	In reserve
SAS Jan Smuts, P.W. Botha, Adam Kok, Sekhukhuni, Isaac Dyobha, René Sethren, Galeshewe and Job Masego decommissioned between 2004 and 2022.

=== T craft-class ===
The T Craft-class patrol vessels are a class of inshore patrol boats currently in service with the SA Navy. A total of three vessels were constructed in Cape Town by T Craft International, entering service between 1992 and 1996. Initially identified only by their pennant numbers, the class was formally renamed in 2003: SAS Tobie (P1552), SAS Tern (P1553), and SAS Tekwane (P1554). Three additional vessels of this type were also built for Israel in 1997.

The vessels are equipped with a Racal-Decca I-band surface search radar and are armed with a single 12.7 mm (.50 BMG) M2 Browning heavy machine gun. Designed for flexibility in constabulary roles, each boat can carry a small boarding team of marines and deploy a rigid-hulled inflatable boat (RHIB) carried in a stern well for boarding operations.

The T Craft-class remains an important part of South Africa's inshore patrol fleet, designed for missions such as harbour protection, boarding operations, counter-smuggling, fisheries protection, and general constabulary tasks. Their catamaran design, shallow draught, and boarding capabilities make them well-suited for littoral and coastal security operations.

Origin: South Africa

Size	Performance	Armament	Other features
Displacement: 37 t Length: 22 metres (72 ft) Complement: 16	Maximum speed: 32 knots (59 km/h; 37 mph) Range: 530 nautical miles (980 km; 610 mi) at 12 knots (22 km/h; 14 mph)	1 × .50 calibre heavy machine gun	1 × RHIB (rigid hull inflatable boat)

Name	Pennant Number	Commissioned	Homeport	Notes
SAS Tobie	P1552	June 1992	-	
SAS Tern	P1553	June 1996	-	
SAS Tekwane	P1554	December 1996	-	

=== Riverine assault boat ===
The Riverine Patrol Boats are a class of locally built inshore craft operated by the SA Navy's Maritime Reaction Squadron. Three vessels were acquired in the mid-2010s to replace the earlier Project Xena patrol boats, which had served in the riverine role since the early 2000s. Built by Marine & General Engineering in Durban and designed by KND Naval Design, the class was developed specifically for operations in shallow and confined waterways.

The boats measure 12 metres in length and are constructed for speed and manoeuvrability, with twin 450 hp MarineDiesel VGT-series engines driving Castoldi water jets. This gives them a top speed of 40–45 knots and excellent handling in riverine and littoral environments. Armament typically consists of a single 12.7 mm heavy machine gun and two 7.62 mm SS-77 machine guns, while each vessel has capacity for a small crew and up to 12 embarked troops.

Equipped with modern navigation and communication systems, including Furuno radar and GPS, as well as Hytera and Icom radios, the boats offer a versatile platform for patrol, interception, and boarding operations. Their design also allows the carriage of a rigid-hull inflatable boat in the stern well to support boarding parties.

Origin: South Africa

Size	Performance	Armament	Other features
Displacement: 8 t Length: 12 metres (39 ft) Complement: 12	Maximum speed: 40–45 knots (74–83 km/h; 46–52 mph) Range: 180 nautical miles (330 km; 210 mi) at 12 knots (22 km/h; 14 mph)	1 × .50 calibre heavy machine gun 2 × 7.62 mm calibre light machine guns	

=== Namacurra class ===
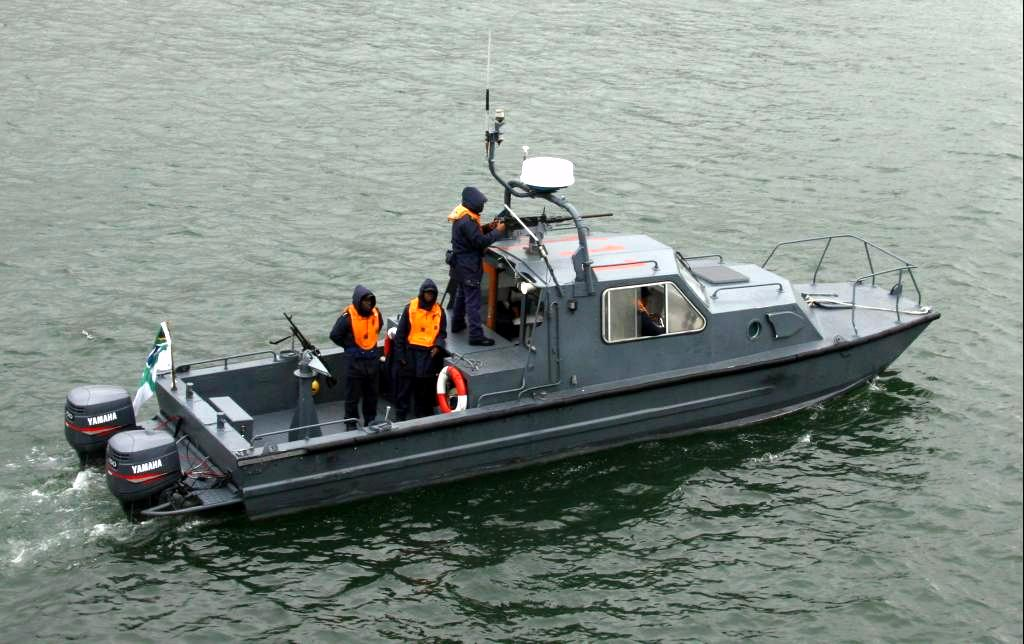
A Namacurra-class patrol boat

The Namacurra-class patrol boats are a class of harbour patrol vessels built in South Africa for the SA Navy. A total of 33 boats were constructed between 1980 and 1981 by Tornado Products in South Africa. The class was designed primarily for harbour protection, base security, and inshore patrols, playing a key role in safeguarding naval facilities during the apartheid era.

The class was introduced to replace the ageing harbour protection craft then in service, providing a modern and more agile alternative. Their main role has been harbour patrol, anti-smuggling operations, base security, and close inshore defence. The Namacurra boats saw extensive use throughout the 1980s and 1990s in both naval bases and forward-deployed locations. Their small size limited their endurance at sea, but they proved well-suited for short-range constabulary and security missions.

Today, 26 of these vessels remain in service, continuing to serve as the South African Navy's principal harbour patrol craft, complementing larger classes such as the T Craft-class inshore patrol boats and the modern Warrior-class MMIPVs.

Origin: South Africa

Size	Performance	Armament	Other features
Displacement: 4 t Length: 9.5 metres (31 ft) Complement: 4	Maximum speed: 30 knots (56 km/h; 35 mph) Range: 180 nautical miles (330 km; 210 mi) at 12 knots (22 km/h; 14 mph)	1 × .50 calibre heavy machine gun 2 × 7.62 mm calibre light machine guns	

=== River class minesweeper ===
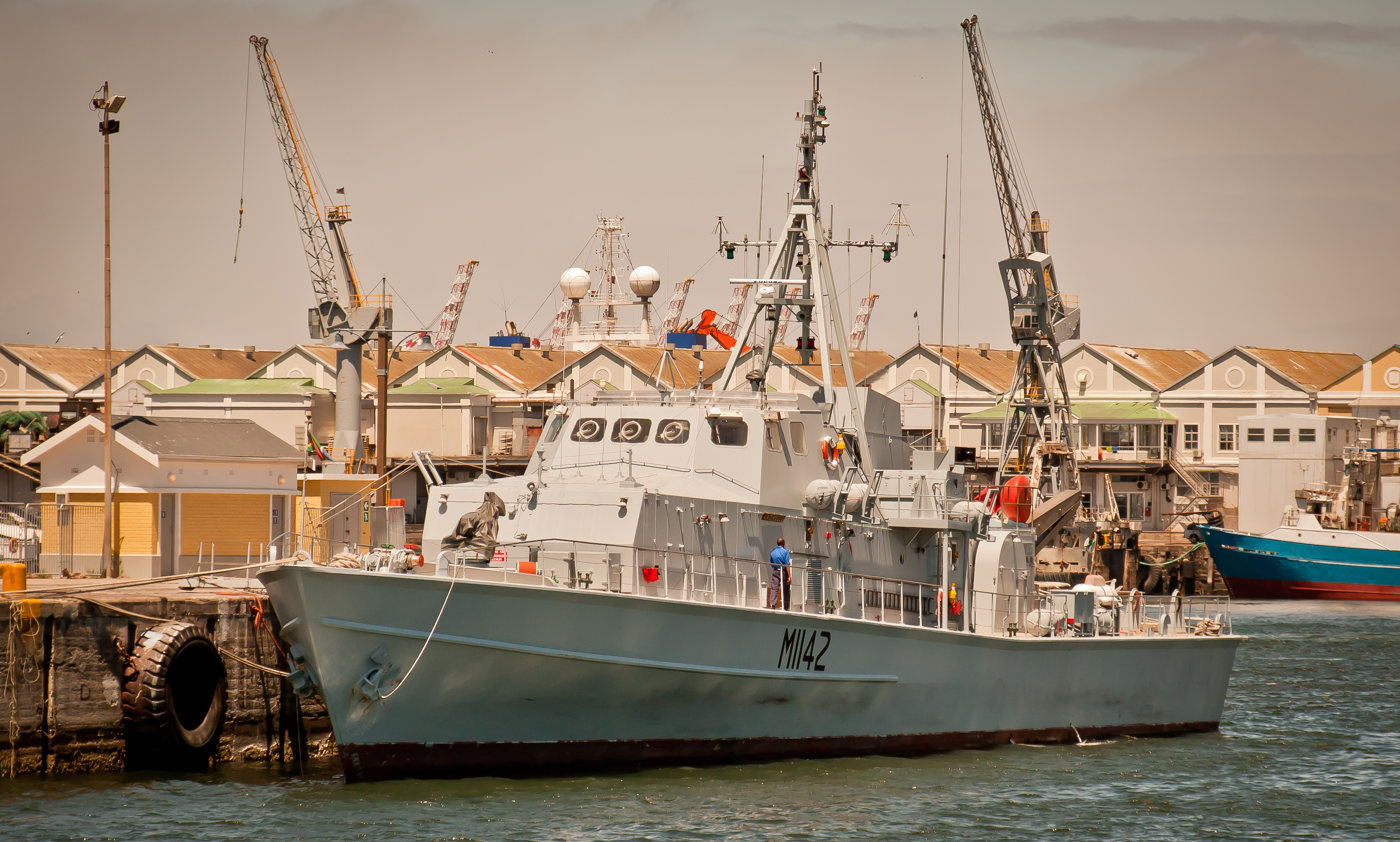
River-class minehunter SAS Umzimkulu

The River-class minehunters are a class of coastal mine countermeasures vessels built in Durban by Sandock Austral during the early 1980s, based on the German Frankenthal-class design but modified with glass-reinforced plastic (GRP) hulls to reduce their magnetic signature. Equipped with minehunting sonar and PAP104 remotely operated vehicles, they provided South Africa with a specialised mine countermeasures capability.

Although four vessels were originally delivered, their current status is unclear. They were known to have been reassigned to secondary roles as offshore patrol vessels and diving tenders after their minehunting systems were retired, leaving them without an active mine warfare capability. It is believed that two of the four vessels may remain in reserve or limited service, though no official confirmation has been given.

The River-class was intended to be replaced under Project Biro by a new generation of Multi-Mission Offshore Patrol Vessels (MMOPVs), which would carry modular unmanned mine countermeasure systems. However, severe budget cuts have stalled this programme, with only three smaller Warrior-class MMIPVs funded and the MMOPVs shelved.

In October 2023, SA Navy Chief Vice Admiral Monde Lobese confirmed that the Navy will instead pursue Project Motso, which aims to containerise the mine countermeasures capability so that it can be deployed aboard the Warrior-class MMIPVs. These vessels are now expected to assume the roles of minehunting, in addition to their patrol duties. Lobese stressed that even the threat of a single sea mine could close a port such as Durban for weeks, with devastating economic consequences.

Origin: Germany / South Africa

Size	Performance	Armament	Other features
Displacement: 390 t full load Length: 48 metres (157 ft) Complement: 40	Maximum speed: 16 knots (30 km/h; 18 mph) Range: 2,000 nautical miles (3,700 km; 2,300 mi)	1 × 20 mm Oerlikon autocannon 2 × 12.7 mm heavy machine guns	2 × PAP 104 remote-controlled submersibles Decca I-band radar Klein VDS minehunting sonar 1 × RHIB (rigid hull inflatable boat)

Name	Pennant number	Commissioned	Homeport	Notes
SAS Umkomaas	M1499	13 January 1981	-	
SAS Umgeni	M1213	1 March 1981	-	
SAS Umzimkulu	M1142	30 October 1981	-	
SAS Umhloti	M1212	15 December 1981	-	

== Replenishment ==
=== Drakensberg class ===
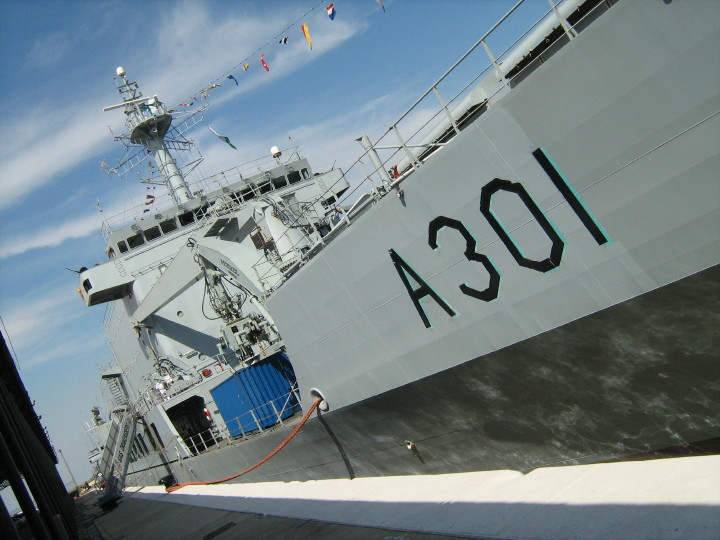
The SAS Drakensberg combat support ship in Buenos Aires, 2010

The SAS Drakensberg (A301) is a fleet replenishment ship and the largest vessel ever built in South Africa. Constructed by Sandock Austral in Durban and commissioned in 1987, she was designed as a multi-role combat support ship capable of providing fuel, dry stores, ammunition, and other supplies to the fleet at sea, thereby extending the operational endurance of South Africa's naval forces.

Displacing approximately 12,500 tons fully loaded and measuring 147 metres in length, the Drakensberg was fitted with replenishment-at-sea (RAS) stations on both beams and aft, allowing her to simultaneously refuel and resupply multiple warships. The vessel also features extensive cargo holds, workshops, medical facilities, and the capacity to embark troops and vehicles for secondary transport or humanitarian operations.

The Drakensberg has participated in numerous international deployments, naval exercises, and goodwill missions since entering service, including peace support operations in Africa and disaster relief efforts. She has represented South Africa abroad, visiting ports across Europe, Asia, and the Americas as a symbol of the Navy's blue-water capability.

Although still in service, the Drakensberg is over three decades old and nearing the end of her operational life. In 2023, plans have been announced to replace her with a new-generation combat support vessel, but as with other SA Navy procurement projects, this is dependent on budget availability. Until then, the Drakensberg remains the Navy's sole combat support ship and a vital element of fleet sustainability and long-range deployment capability.

Origin: South Africa

Size	Performance	Armament	Other features
Displacement: 12,500 t full load Length: 147 metres (482 ft) Complement: 150	Maximum speed: 21 knots (39 km/h; 24 mph) Range: 8,500 nautical miles (15,700 km; 9,800 mi)	4 × Oerlikon 20 mm GAM-BO1 autocannons 4 × Browning 12.7 mm heavy machine guns	5,500 metric tonnes of diesel fuel 750 metric tonnes of ammunition and dry stores 210 metric tonnes of fresh water 2 × Delta 80 landing craft utility 2 × RHIBs (rigid hull inflatable boats) Aviation: 2 × Atlas Oryx helicopters

Name	Pennant number	Commissioned	Homeport	Notes
SAS Drakensberg	A301	11 November 1987	-	

== Hydrographic survey ==
=== Protea class ===
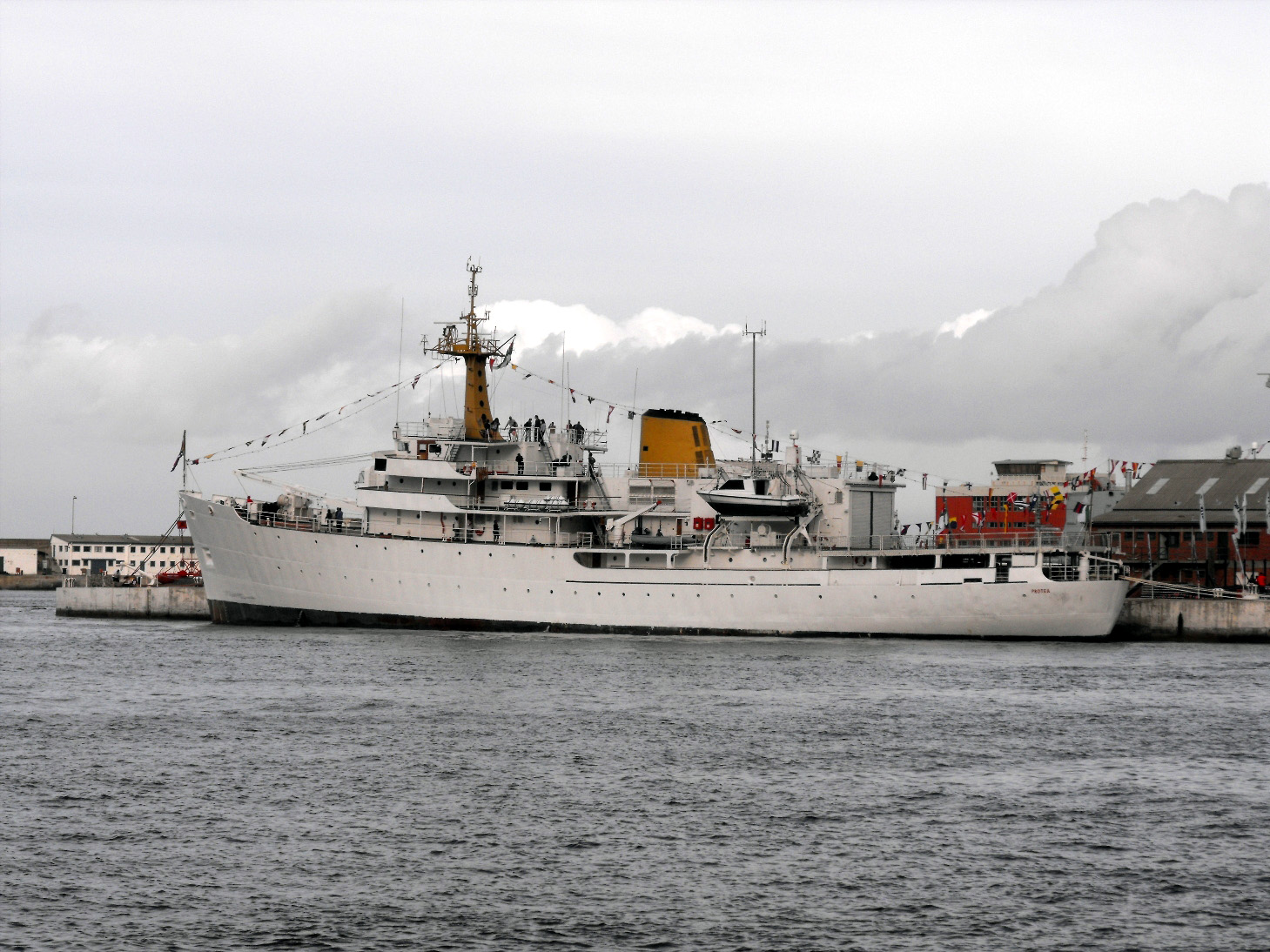
The survey vessel SAS Protea

The SAS Protea (A324) is a hydrographic survey vessel of the SA Navy, based on the British Hecla-class design. Built by Yarrow Shipbuilders on the River Clyde in Scotland, she was launched in 1972 and commissioned the same year. The vessel was designed to conduct detailed hydrographic and oceanographic surveys, providing accurate nautical charts and seabed mapping essential for safe navigation, naval planning, and maritime trade.

The Protea is fitted with hydrographic sonar, echo-sounders, and oceanographic equipment, along with onboard laboratories and data-processing facilities. She also has a helicopter landing deck and can accommodate embarked survey teams and scientists in addition to her naval crew, allowing her to support both military and civilian hydrographic operations.

Throughout her more than 50 years of service, the Protea has been central to charting South African waters and supporting international survey cooperation. She has participated in numerous naval exercises, undertaken diplomatic port visits abroad, and remains one of the Navy's most recognisable vessels. Despite her age, she has been periodically refitted to extend her operational life, underscoring her importance as South Africa's sole hydrographic ship.

The Protea is scheduled to be replaced by the SAS Nelson Mandela, a state-of-the-art hydrographic survey vessel being constructed by Sandock Austral Shipyards in Durban under Project Hotel. The Nelson Mandela will introduce modern digital hydrographic systems, autonomous survey craft, and advanced oceanographic sensors to ensure South Africa maintains a world-class hydrographic capability. Until her replacement enters service, the Protea continues to serve as the Navy's flagship survey vessel and one of its longest-serving ships.

Origin: United Kingdom

Size	Performance	Armament	Other features
Displacement: 2,750 t Length: 79 metres (259 ft) Complement: 10 officers + 114 sailors	Maximum speed: 16 knots (30 km/h; 18 mph) Range: 17,000 nautical miles (31,000 km; 20,000 mi) at 9 knots (17 km/h; 10 mph)	None	Sonars: EGNG side-scan Radar: Racal Decca I-band Aviation: Helicopter deck and hangar

Name	Pennant number	Commissioned	Homeport	Notes
SAS Protea	A324	23 May 1972	Naval Base Simon's Town	

== Coastal and harbour tugs ==
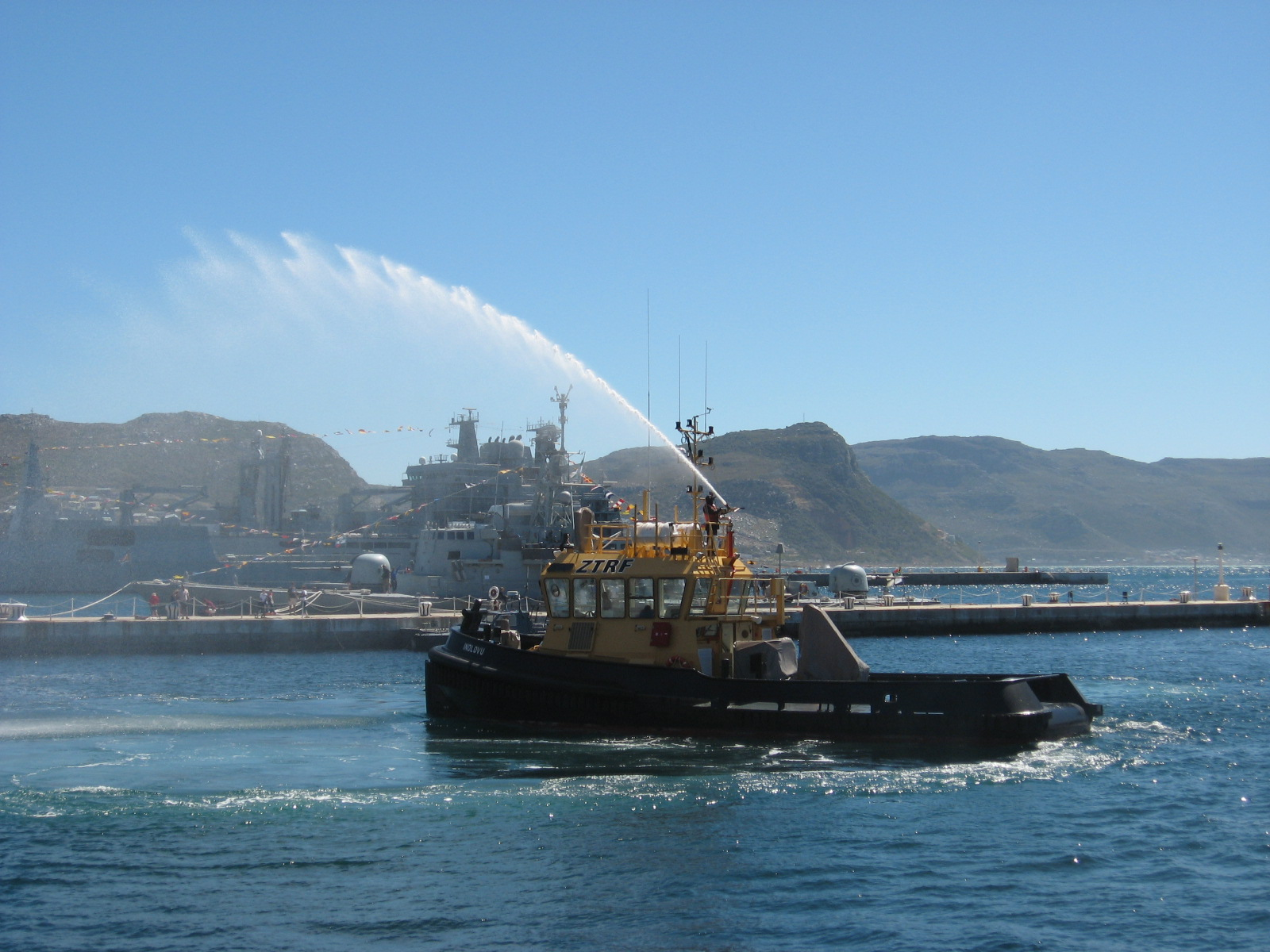
South African Navy tug, Indlovu

The SA Navy operates a small but essential fleet of harbour tugboats that provide vital support functions at its naval bases in Simon's Town and Durban. These vessels are primarily used for towing, berthing assistance, firefighting, salvage, and general harbour duties, ensuring that larger warships such as the Valour-class frigates, submarines, and the fleet replenishment vessel SAS Drakensberg can safely enter and leave port.

The tugboats are of varying classes and generations, they are built locally in South Africa, reflecting the Navy's long-standing reliance on domestic shipyards for support craft. They are generally small displacement vessels with powerful diesel engines and specialised towing equipment, capable of operating in both harbour waters and limited offshore conditions when required. Equipped with firefighting monitors, towing winches, and reinforced hulls, the tugs play a critical role in emergency response and fleet logistics.

While not combatants, the Navy's tugboats are indispensable force multipliers, enabling day-to-day fleet operations and providing essential safety at sea and in harbour. They also serve in secondary roles such as search and rescue, pollution control, and supporting naval exercises.

Origin: South Africa

Name	Year Delivered / Class	Length / Key Specs	Notes	Homeport
Imvubu	2015, Damen ATD Tug 2909	~29 m, 43 tonne bollard pull, 3000 kW; max speed ~13.2 knots	Towing, mooring, firefighting, harbour duties—replaces older tugs like De Neys and De Mist	Simon's Town
Inyathi	2016, Damen ATD Tug 2909	Same class as Imvubu, 29 m, 43 t bollard pull, 13.2 knots	Same roles—part of the two new tugs under Project Canter	Simon's Town
Indlovu	2006, Damen Stan Tug 2006 (via Farocean Marine)	–	Special bow for handling submarines; harbour tug work, berthing support	Simon's Town
Tschukundu	2006, Damen Stan Tug 2006	–	Similar harbour/submarine support function; handles berthing, tow etc	Simon's Town
Umalusi	1995 (acquired in 1997)	–	Older tug still in service; general harbour jobs and support for larger SAN vessels	Simon's Town / Durban??

== See also ==
- List of decommissioned ships of the South African Navy
