= Salisbury Island, Durban =

Former island of South Africa

Salisbury Island
- Interactive map of Salisbury Island

Geography
- Location: Durban Harbour, Indian Ocean
- Coordinates: 29°53′01″S 31°02′11″E

Administration
- South Africa

Salisbury Island is a naval base located inside the Port of Durban on the east coast of South Africa. It is a former island until the Second World War, when construction of Naval Base Durban connected it to the mainland by a causeway. Today it is the home port of the patrol flotilla.

== History ==
The island, once a mangrove-covered sandbank, was named after HMS Salisbury, the Royal Navy ship that surveyed the future harbour area for the newly-established Port Natal colony in the 1820s.

Naval Base Durban was constructed for the Royal Navy during the Second World War in response to the threat of Japanese attacks on shipping along the east coast of Africa. It was during this construction that the island became a peninsula through the construction of a causeway.

After the war the base was turned over to the South African Naval Service (SANS), which has since maintained a fluctuating and intermittent presence.

With the signing of the Simonstown Agreement in 1957, the Royal Navy gave up its control of the SANS in exchange for the use of the base at Simon's Town. The SANS became the South African Navy (SAN) and Salisbury Island its main base. When the Simonstown Agreement ended, the SAN moved most of its operations to Simon's Town and Durban became a secondary facility.

In 1961, the University College for Indians was established on Salisbury Island. It closed down in 1971, when it was replaced by the University of Durban-Westville.

From the mid-1970s until the early 1990s, it was the home base of the Minister class strike craft flotilla. Even after the closure of the college, the island maintained a link with the Indian community in the form of SAS Jalsena, which was the main training facility for Indian South African sailors. Upon the retirement of the strike craft, all combat ships of the navy were based at Naval Base Simon's Town and the Durban base was reduced to a naval station in 2002. Some of the facilities of the base were then taken over by the army as a general support base. In 2012, a decision to base the navy's offshore patrol flotilla in Durban led to a programme of renovation to restore the facility back to full naval base status.

== Today ==
In December 2015, Salisbury Island was redesignated a naval base, as the home port of the patrol flotilla.
