= SAS Protea =

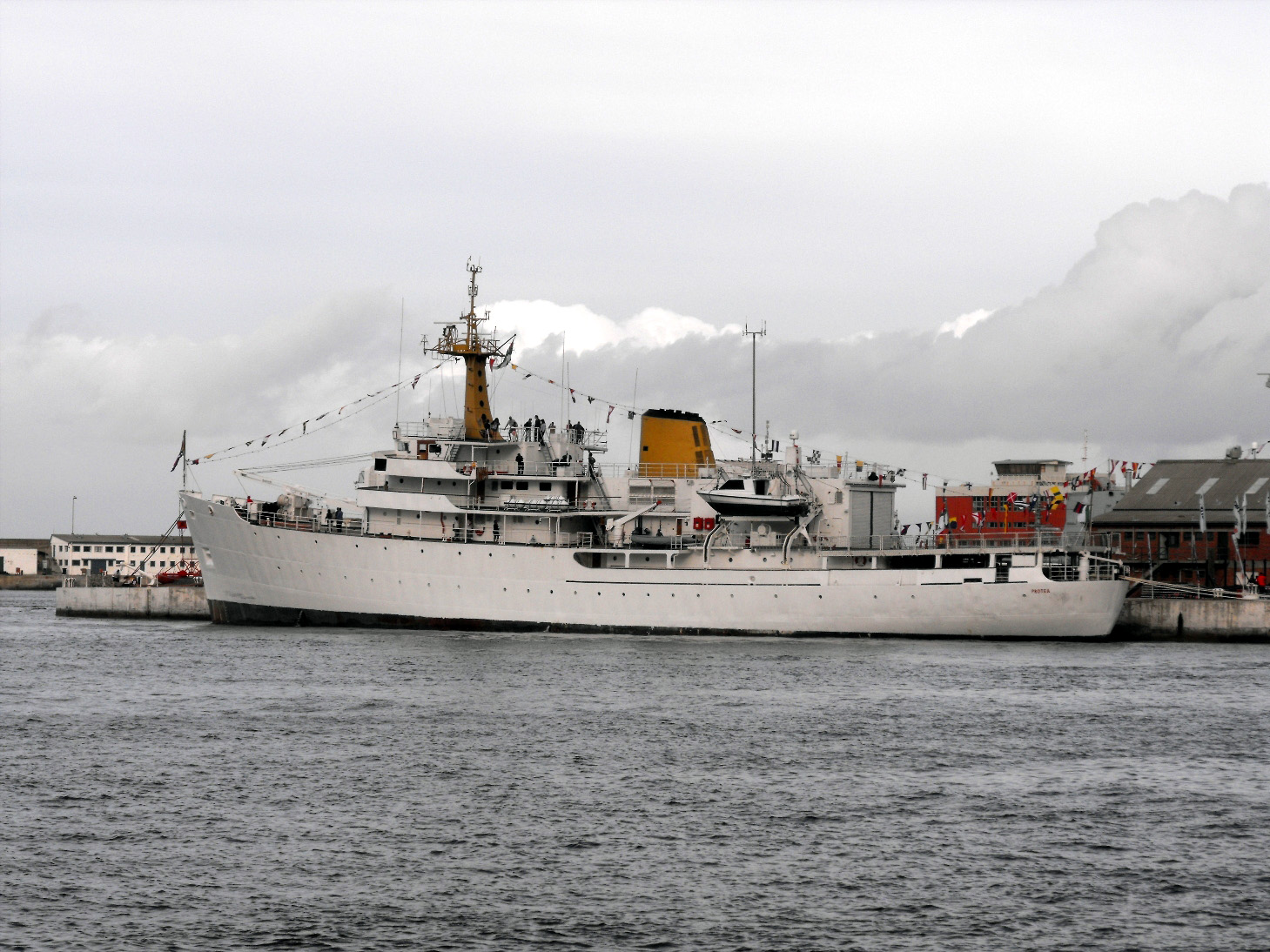
- SAS Protea alongside

History

South Africa
- Name: SAS Protea
- Namesake: Protea flower
- Launched: 14 July 1971
- Commissioned: 23 May 1972
- Home port: Simonstown
- Identification: IMO number: 7114707; MMSI number: 460100020; Callsign: ZTRX
- Status: Active as of 2023

General characteristics
- Class & type: Hecla-class survey vessel
- Displacement: 2,750 tons
- Length: 79.3 m (260.2 ft)
- Beam: 15 m (49.2 ft)
- Draught: 16 ft (4.9 m)
- Propulsion: 4 x 12-cylinder MTU diesels geared to one shaft and controllable-pitch propeller
- Speed: 16 knots (30 km/h)
- Range: 17,000 nmi (31,000 km) at 12 knots (22 km/h; 14 mph)
- Complement: 124, including 10 officers

SAS Protea is a survey vessel of the South African Navy, part of the Hecla-class survey vessels built for the British Royal Navy. Protea was the fifth Hecla-class vessel and was commissioned on 23 May 1972

As of 2023, Protea remains in service.

== Role ==
Protea is a specialist hydrographic survey vessel, although its equipment has been used in search and rescue operations using Protea's shallow water route survey system (SWRSS). She is the only ship in the South African Navy that is painted white, denoting that she is not a warship. Her hull is strengthened for navigation in ice and she is fitted with a transverse bow thruster unit, for increased manoeuvrability in harbour.

== History ==
Protea was commissioned at Scotstoun, Glasgow and arrived in South Africa on 14 June 1972.

In 1978 Protea took part in an international krill research project, becoming the first South African Navy vessel to round Cape Horn. She also acted as the guardship for the 1976 and 1979 Transatlantic Yacht races.

In 1981 she was involved in Operation Kerslig, a clandestine operation to attack oil facilities in Luanda, Angola.

She remained active in the post-apartheid navy and as late as February 2023 was reported to be participating in joint South African-Russian-Chinese exercises which involved the frigate Admiral Gorshkov and tanker Kama from the Russian Navy along with the destroyer Huainan, the frigate Rizhao and the support ship Kekexilihu from the Chinese Navy, as well as other units from the South African Navy including the frigate Mendi.

== See also ==
- List of ships of the South African Navy
