= Søderlind =

Søderlind is a Norwegian surname. Notable people with the surname include:

- Didrik Søderlind (born 1971), Norwegian secular humanist and skeptic
- Ragnar Søderlind (born 1945), Norwegian composer

== See also ==
- Söderlund
