= Naval Base Durban =

- Salisbury Island, Durban Harbour

Site information
- Owner: Department of Defence
- Operator: South African Navy

Location
- Coordinates: 29°52′57.47570″S 31°2′22.43605″E

Site history
- Built: WWII

Naval Base Durban in Durban harbour is a naval base of the South African Navy, situated on Salisbury Island, which is now joined to the mainland through land reclamation.

It was formerly a full naval base until it was downgraded to a naval station in 2002. With the reduction in naval activities much of the island was taken over by the Army as a general support base, but they left after a few years resulting in the abandoned section becoming derelict. In 2012 a decision was made to renovate and expand the facilities back up to a full naval base to accommodate the South African Navy's offshore patrol flotilla. In December 2015 it was officially redesignated Naval Base Durban.

Three Warrior-class offshore patrol vessels; SAS Isaac Dyobha, SAS Galeshewe and SAS Makhanda are based in Durban. When the new offshore and inshore patrol vessels enter service they will replace the Warrior-class vessels.

== History ==
=== Second World War ===
The entry of Japan into the Second World War on the side of the Axis powers and their ability to threaten the east coast of Africa prompted the construction of a new naval base on Salisbury Island. In the process of this construction the island was linked to the mainland by a causeway and the level of the land was raised three metres. Besides wharves the base facilities included barracks, workshops, a hospital as well as training facilities. A floating dry dock and crane were also installed. The construction was however only completed after the war had ended.
