= A301 =

A301 may refer to:

- A301 road (Great Britain), a road in London, England
- SAS Drakensberg (A301), a ship
