= Robert Simpson-Anderson =

Chief of the South African Navy (1992–2000)

Vice Admiral Robert Claude Simpson-Anderson SSAS SD SM MMM SAN (Rtd)
- Born: 4 July 1942 (age 84); Pretoria, South Africa
- Relatives: Geesje Jacobs (wife)
- Military career
- Allegiance: South Africa
- Branch: South African Navy
- Rank: Vice Admiral
- Commands: Chief of the Navy; South African Military Academy; SAS Scorpion; SAS Jan Smuts
- Awards

Vice-Admiral Robert Claude Simpson-Anderson SSAS SD SM MMM SAN (Rtd) (born July 1942 in Pretoria, South Africa) is a former Chief of the South African Navy (1 September 1992 – 31 October 2000)

He joined the Navy in 1964 and completed a BMil. In 1977 he commanded the Navy's first Strike Craft, SAS Jan Smuts. In 1978 he completed an MBL via Unisa. In 1984 he became the OC of SAS Scorpion, the Strike Craft Flotilla and in 1986 as a Commodore, the Officer Commanding of the South African Military Academy in Saldhana. At the end of 1990 he was promoted to rear admiral and posted as Chief of Naval Support.

== Awards and decorations ==
In 1999 Vice Admiral Simpson-Anderson was awarded the Order of the Star of South Africa (Silver). His list of awards includes:

- Star of South Africa (Silver) (SSAS)
- Southern Cross Decoration (SD)
- Southern Cross Medal (1975) (SM)
- Military Merit Medal (MMM)
- Pro Patria Medal
- Southern Africa Medal
- General Service Medal (South Africa)
- Unitas (Unity) Medal
- Good Service Medal (Gold (30 Years))
- Good Service Medal (Silver (20 Years))
- Good Service Medal (Bronze (10 Years))
- Order of the Cloud and Banner (5^{th} Grade - with Cravat) (ORB)
- Order of the Cloud and Banner (3^{rd} Grade - with Yellow Grand Cordon) (ORB)
- Legion of Merit (Commander) (LOM)
- Grand Cross of Naval Merit of the Order of May (Argentina)

Military offices
Preceded by Lambert Woodburne	Chief of the South African Navy; 1992–2000	Succeeded by Johan Retief
Preceded by Chris Bennett	Chief of Naval Support; 1989–1990	Succeeded by Martyn Trainor
Preceded by Willie Kotze	Commandant of the South African Military Academy; 1986–1989	Succeeded by Fred du Toit
