= Arne Söderlund =

Rear Admiral Arne Söderlund SM PS MMM SAN (Rtd)
- Born: Kimberley, Northern Cape
- Military career
- Allegiance: South Africa
- Branch: South African Navy
- Service years: 1966–2006
- Rank: Rear admiral (JG)
- Nickname: Angel
- Commands: SAS Fleur; SAS Oswald Pirow
- Conflicts: South African Border War
- Awards: Southern Cross Medal SM iPhrothiya yeSiliva PS Military Merit Medal MMM Pro Patria Medal Southern Africa Medal General Service Medal (South Africa) Unitas (Unity) Medal Medalje vir Troue Diens (Medal for Loyal Service) Good Service Medal

Rear Admiral (Junior Grade) Arne "Angel" Söderlund PS SM MMM SAN (Rtd) is a retired South African Navy officer and author.

== Early life ==
Admiral Söderlund was born and educated in Kimberley, South Africa where he matriculated from CBC.

== Navy career ==
Söderlund joined the SA Navy in 1966.

In 1969 he was attached to the Argentine Navy for training aboard the Sail Training Vessel ARA Libertad and on his return served aboard mine sweepers as First lieutenant and Type 12 frigates as communications and later anti-submarine warfare officer.

He commanded the ship SAS Fleur, before being assigned to the strike craft project in Israel, where he commissioned the second strike craft P1562 SAS P.W. Botha (P1562) and later SAS Shaka (P1562)) as First lieutenant and operations officer. In 1980 he was appointed as the first captain of SAS Oswald Pirow (later SAS Rene Sethren). After a four-year appointment to chief of staff intelligence, he was appointed as naval and military attaché in London from 1994 to 1997.

Promoted commodore (which later changed to rear admiral (junior grade)) he served as director fleet force preparation when Fleet Command was formed in 1999. He retired in 2006.

== Author ==
He co-authored the following books:

- South Africa's Navy : A Navy of the People and for the People. with Chris Bennett
- Iron Fist From The Sea: South Africa's Seaborne Raiders 1978–1988. with Douw Steyn

== Submarine museum ==
Söderlund was instrumental in setting up the SAS Assegaai as a submarine museum. The guest of honour at the ribbon cutting ceremony was Rear Admiral (JG) Theo Honiball (Ret), who as a Lieutenant commander was her first officer commanding. The ribbon was cut by Vice-Admiral Refiloe Johannes Mudimu, Chief of the Navy.

== Naval museum ==
Söderlund owns and runs a Maritime Museum in his house, the museum stores and covers Naval Warfare items from the early 1500's through to current day, it concentrates mainly on the SA Navy and the Royal Navy but includes items from many Services. Söderlund can be contacted via the Simons Town Naval Base.

== Awards and decorations ==
- Southern Cross Medal (1975) (SM)
- iPhrothiya yeSiliva (Silver Protea) (PS)
- Military Merit Medal (MMM)
- Pro Patria Medal
- Southern Africa Medal
- General Service Medal (South Africa)
- Unitas (Unity) Medal
- Medalje vir Troue Diens (Medal for Loyal Service) (40 Year Clasp)
- Good Service Medal (Gold (30 Years))
- Good Service Medal (Silver (20 Years))
- Good Service Medal (Bronze (10 Years))

Military offices
Preceded by New	Director Fleet Force Preparation; 1999–2006	Succeeded by Jan Rabe
