= Russian frigate Admiral Gorshkov =

Admiral Gorshkov-class frigate

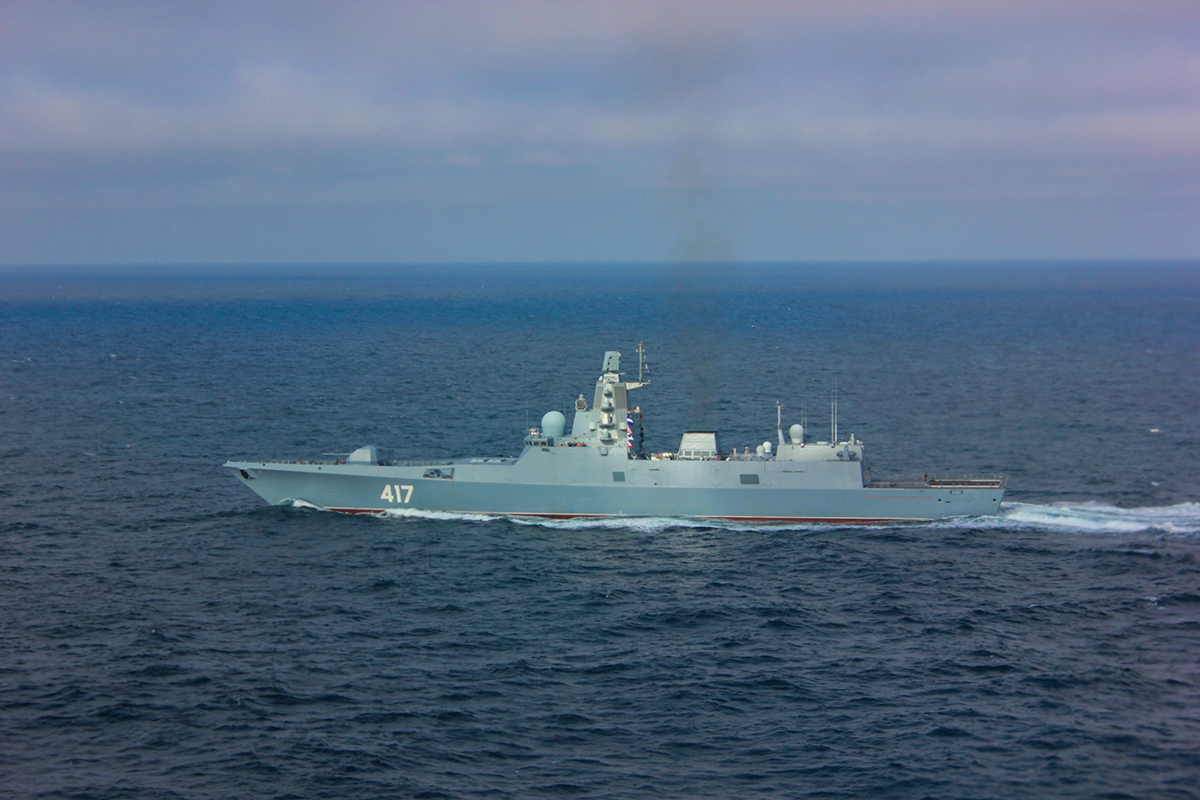
- Admiral Gorshkov in 2018

History

Russia
- Name: Admiral Flota Sovetskogo Soyuza Gorshkov
- Namesake: Sergey Gorshkov
- Builder: Severnaya Verf, Saint Petersburg
- Laid down: 1 February 2006
- Launched: 29 October 2010
- Commissioned: 28 July 2018
- Status: Active
- Notes: Pennant number 454 (previously 417)

General characteristics
- Class & type: Admiral Gorshkov-class frigate
- Displacement: 4,550 tons
- Length: 135 m (442.9 ft)
- Beam: 16 m (52.5 ft)
- Draft: 4.5 m (14.8 ft)
- Propulsion: 2 shaft CODAG; 2 10D49 cruise diesel engines 5,200 shp (3,900 kW); 2 M90FR boost gas turbines 27,500 shp (20,500 kW); Total: 65,000 shp (48,000 kW)
- Speed: 29.5 knots (54.6 km/h; 33.9 mph)
- Range: 4,000 nautical miles (7,400 km; 4,600 mi) at 14 knots (26 km/h; 16 mph)
- Complement: 210
- Sensors & processing systems: Air search radar: 3-D air search Radar Furke-4 5P-27 main radar for Detection, tracking and targeting of air and surface targets, Poliment 5P-20K 4 faced active phased array search, tracking and guidance/management radar; Surface search radar: Monolit 34K1 surface search, AShM and additional artillery targeting radar; Main Artillery radar fire control system : Puma 5P-10; Sonar: Zarya M sonar, Vinyetka towed array sonar; Navigation: 3 × Pal-N radars; Other: 2 × target illuminators aft superstructure for Palash CIWS; Communications: Vigstar Centaurus-NM; Electro-Optical Systems: 2 × MTK-201M and 2 × 5P-520; Combat system: Sigma/Sigma 22350
- Electronic warfare & decoys: EW Suite: Prosvet-M; Countermeasures: 2 × PU KT-308; 8 × PU KT-216; 2 × 5P-42 Filin
- Armament: 1 × 130 mm Amethyst/Arsenal A-192M naval gun; 16 (2 × 8) UKSK VLS cells for Kalibr, Oniks, Zircon anti-ship cruise missiles or Otvet anti-submarine missiles.; 32 (2 × 16) Redut VLS cells for 9M96, 9M96M, 9M96D/9M96DM(M2), and/or quad-packed 9M100 surface-to-air missiles; 2 × Palash CIWS each with twin Gryazev-Shipunov GSh-6-30 6 barrel 30 mm rotary cannons.; 2 × 4 330 mm torpedo tubes for Paket-NK anti-torpedo/anti-submarine torpedoes; 2 × 14.5 mm MTPU pedestal machine guns
- Aircraft carried: 1 × Ka-27 series helicopter
- Aviation facilities: Helipad and hangar for one helicopter

Admiral Flota Sovetskogo Soyuza Gorshkov (Russian: Адмирал флота Советского Союза Горшков) is an Admiral Gorshkov-class frigate of the Russian Navy and the lead ship of the class.

== Design ==
The Admiral Gorshkov class is the successor to the Neustrashimy and Krivak-class frigates. Unlike their Soviet-era predecessors, the new ships are designed for multiple roles. They are to be capable of executing long-range strikes, conducting anti-submarine warfare, and carrying out escort missions.

== Construction and career ==
The ship was laid down on 1 February 2006 and launched on 29 October 2010. She was expected to join the Russian Navy in November 2013, but problems with delivery of the main naval gun, engine fire and testing of the ship's Poliment-Redut air defence system delayed the commissioning several times. From 23 to 25 December 2017 Admiral Gorshkov conducted sea trials near UK waters in the North Sea, where she was shadowed by HMS St Albans. She was finally commissioned into the Russian Navy on 28 July 2018, the day before her debut at the Main Naval Day parade in Saint Petersburg. With pennant number 454 (earlier 417), Admiral Gorshkov is part of the 43rd Missile Ship Division of the Northern Fleet at Severomorsk. The ship is named after Hero of the Soviet Union Sergey Gorshkov. The ship performed 16 firing exercises during her trials.

On her maiden distant deployment, Admiral Gorshkov travelled some 35,000 nautical miles (65,000 km) in the Russian Navy's first global circumnavigation since Stepan Makarov's 1886–1889 voyage on the corvette Vityaz. Accompanied by medium sea tanker Kama, logistics support vessel Elbrus and large ocean tug Nikolay Chiker, Admiral Gorshkov visited Djibouti (Djibouti), Colombo (Sri Lanka), Qingdao (China), Vladivostok (Russia), Puerto Bolívar (Ecuador), Havana (Cuba), Praia (Cape Verde) and Kronstadt (Russia), before returning to her homeport Severomorsk. The 175-day long journey took place between 26 February and 19 August 2019. On her route home, she also participated in the "Ocean Shield 2019" major naval exercise of the Russian Navy held in the Mediterranean Sea, thought to be the largest in the independent Russia with some 70 warships, submarines and auxiliary ships participating.

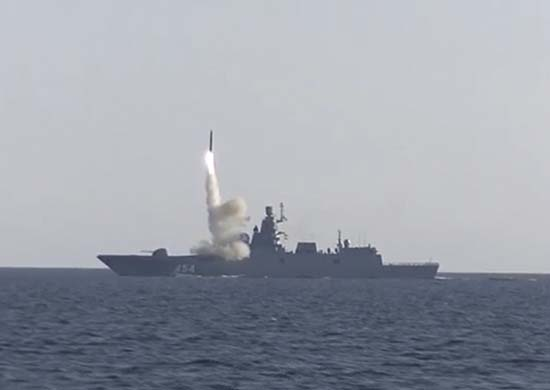
Admiral Gorshkov launches a Zircon missile

In early January 2020, Admiral Gorshkov test-launched the 3M22 Zircon hypersonic anti-ship cruise missile from the Barents Sea, as part of the missile's state trials. This was the first time the Zircon was launched from a naval vessel. Additional launches of the Zircon missile took place in October, November and December. All the tests were successful.

On 19 February 2021, Admiral Gorshkov entered the Barents Sea for exercises. She conducted anti-submarine and air defence exercises along with the tug Altay. On 24 March, the frigate entered the Barents Sea and launched an Onyx missile, being accompanied by icebreaker Ilya Muromets, supply ship Elbrus and tug MB-110, while hydrographic vessels Romuald Muklevich, Nikolay Skosyrev, Aleksandr Makorta and anti-saboteur ship Valeriy Fedyanin were also active in the Barents Sea at the same time.

On 28 May 2022, Admiral Gorshkov test fired a 3M22 Zircon missile in the Barents Sea at a target in the White Sea. On 4 June, she was underway in the Barents Sea again conducting helicopter operations. The frigate took part in the parade on the Russian Navy day on 31 July in Saint Petersburg. On the same day, the Russian president Vladimir Putin announced Admiral Gorshkov would be the first ship armed with Zircon missiles. She underwent maintenance in Kronstadt Marine Plant until November and on 23 November conducted firing with the Redut missile complex in the Baltic Sea. On 9 December 2022, she was sailing along the Norwegian coast, finally returning to Severomorsk on 11 December. In late December 2022, Admiral Gorshkov was preparing to re-enter service in early January 2023 armed with Zircon hypersonic missiles.

On 4 January 2023, Admiral Gorshkov re-entered service equipped with Zircon hypersonic missiles, and began a voyage that will pass through the Atlantic and Indian Oceans, as well as the Mediterranean Sea. On 14 February the frigate docked in Cape Town ahead of planned exercises with the Chinese People's Liberation Army Navy (PLAN) and the South African Navy. The exercise began on 18 February and involved Admiral Gorshkov together with the tanker Kama from the Russian Navy along with the destroyer Huainan, the frigate Rizhao and the support ship Kekexilihu from the PLAN. Several vessels from the South African Navy were expected to participate including the frigate Mendi as well as the Warrior-class patrol vessel King Sekhukhune I and the hydrographic survey vessel Protea.

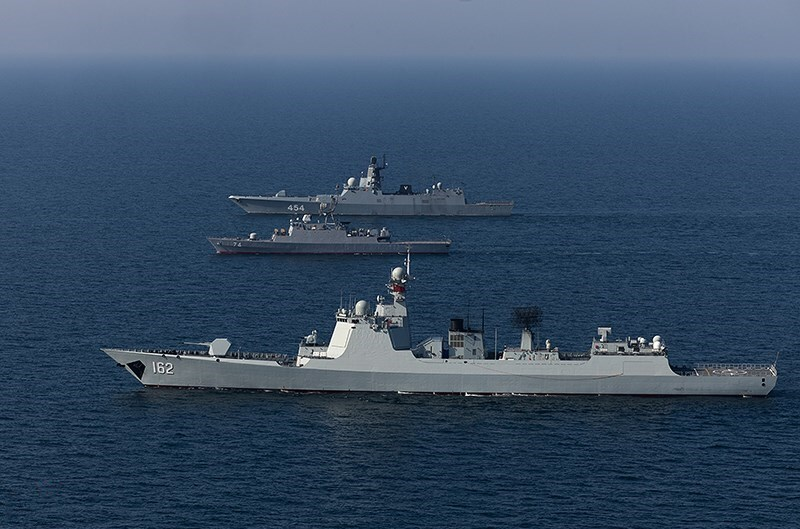
Admiral Gorshkov (background) conducting an exercise with Iranian frigate Sahand (middle), and Chinese destroyer Nanning as part of the Maritime Security Belt

Subsequently in March, Admiral Gorshkov and Kama engaged in joint exercises with the Chinese and Iranian navies in the Gulf of Oman. In early April 2023, the lead frigate of Russia's Northern fleet made headlines when docking at the Saudi port of Jeddah, after arriving from South Africa and participating in naval drills in the Indian Ocean and Arabian Sea, the first docking there of a Russian naval vessel in almost a decade. The event was deemed significant and raised concerns in the West about Saudi objectives and due to the ship's hypersonic rocket artillery, and modern anti-submarine weapons. The ship subsequently entered the Mediterranean, docking at Russian naval facilities in Syria. As of June 2023, the frigate was still reported in the Mediterranean, taking part in a rescue operation in Greek waters. The frigate visited Algeria while in the Mediterranean and returned to her home port on the Kola peninsula in September 2023.

In June 2024, the frigate was one of four Russian vessels to anchor in Havana Bay, Cuba as part of a five-day visit. Earlier, she had undertaken missile drills in the Atlantic. In September 2025, the frigate was reported to have fired a Zircon missile during an exercise in the Barents Sea. The ship remained active as of 2026.
