= Chris Bennett (admiral) =

South African military personnel (1937–2021)

Rear Admiral Christopher Hart Bennett SD SM SAN (Rtd)
- Born: 8 December 1937; Kwekwe, Zimbabwe
- Died: 17 August 2021 (aged 83)
- Citizenship: South African
- Occupation: Author
- Writing career
- Language: English
- Genre: History
- Subjects: Military, Navy
- Military career
- Allegiance: Republic of South Africa; Republic of South Africa
- Branch: South African Navy
- Service years: 1956–1990
- Rank: Rear Admiral
- Commands: Chief of Naval Support; FOC Naval Command West; SAS Mosselbaai
- Awards: Southern Cross Medal SM Military Merit Medal MMM Pro Patria Medal Good Service Medal Permanent Force Good Service Medal
- Other work: Author

Rear Admiral Chris Bennett SD SM SAN (Rtd) (8 December 1937 – 17 August 2021) was the author of a number of books.

== Naval career ==
Bennett was born in KweKwe. He attended school at Kingswood College before joining the South African Navy.

He commanded the Minesweeper SAS Mosselbaai in 1972. He was promoted to rear admiral in 1986 and appointed as Flag Officer Commanding Naval Command West until January 1989. In 1989 he was appointed Chief of Naval Staff and then as Chief of Naval Support. He retired in 1990

== Awards and decorations ==
- Southern Cross Medal (1975) (SM)
- Military Merit Medal (MMM)
- Pro Patria Medal
- Good Service Medal (Gold (30 Years))
- Good Service Medal (Silver (20 Years))
- Permanent Force Good Service Medal

== Books ==
- Three Frigates - The South African Navy Comes of Age (2nd ed.). Durban, South Africa: Just Done Productions Publishing. 2006. ISBN 978-1-920169-02-2. Archived from the original on 4 September 2014.
- South Africa's Navy : A Navy of the People and for the People. SA Navy. 2008. ISBN 978-0-620-41446-3. with Arne Söderlund
- Bennett, Chris (2011). South African Naval events: day by day, 1488 to 2009. Simon's Town, South Africa: Naval Heritage Trust. ISBN 9780620430142. OCLC 730229500.

Military offices
New title	Flag Officer Commanding NAVCOM West; 1986–1989	Succeeded by Lambert Jackson Woodburne
Unknown	Chief of Naval Support; 1989–1990	Succeeded by Robert Simpson-Anderson
Preceded by James Sleigh	Chief of Naval Staff; 1988–1989	Unknown
