= Söderlund =

Söderlund is a Swedish surname. Notable people with the surname include:

- Åke Söderlund (1925–2002), Swedish racewalker
- Alexander Søderlund (born 1987), Norwegian football player
- Arne Söderlund, South African Navy officer and author
- Carl Söderlund (born 1997), Swedish tennis player
- Curt Söderlund (born 1945), Swedish cyclist
- Erik Söderlund (1925–2009), Swedish racewalker, twin brother of Åke
- Helene Söderlund (born 1987), Swedish ski-orienteering competitor
- Jezper Söderlund (born 1980), Swedish record producer and electronic music artist
- Jonas Söderlund (born 1971), Swedish organizational theorist
- Marcus Söderlund, Swedish music video, commercial and documentary director
- Mats Söderlund (born 1967), Swedish musician
- Michael Söderlund (born 1962), Swedish swimmer
- Patrick Söderlund (born 1973), Swedish businessman
- Robbin Söderlund (born 1987), Swedish DJ and music producer
- Tim Söderlund (born 1998), Swedish ice hockey player
- Ulla-Britt Söderlund (1943–1985), Swedish costume designer
