= Operation Kerslig =

- Part of the South African Border War
- Location: Angola Operation Kerslig (Angola)
- Objective: Raid on the oil refinery in Luanda.
- Date: 30 November 1981

Operation Kerslig (Operation Candle Light) was a South African Defence Force special forces raid on an oil refinery outside Luanda, Angola. The raid took place on 30 November 1981 by members of the 1 and 4 Reconnaissance Regiments.

== Background ==
The Petrangol refinery was built in 1958 and supplied Angola with petrol, diesel, and jet fuel and was managed by Belgium company Petrofina SA . The refinery was to be attacked around 1am on 30 November with the intention to damage or destroy the distillation towers, fuel tanks and pipelines within the refinery complex. Members of 1 Reconnaissance Regiment (1RR) would conduct the initial surveillance of the refinery and the actual attack while 4 Reconnaissance Regiment (4RR) would man the special forces Barracuda boats and supply the divers with transport to and from the Angolan capital of Luanda supplied by the South African Navy strike-craft. The mission was to be covert and blame laid on UNITA as being responsible and not the South African Defence Force. On 16 November, 1 RR was given training by 4 RR to refresh their knowledge with the boats and by 18 November with the two South African Navy strike-craft. By 20 November the two strike-craft, SAS Oswald Pirow and SAS Jim Fouche, left Saldanha Bay with the 4RR boat crews and a two-man 1RR reconnaissance team and arrived for refuelling on 22 November at Walvis Bay before heading northwards to Angola. The survey vessel SAS Protea (A324) would arrive on 24 November at Walvis Bay from Simon's Town and picked up the members of 1 RR attack teams before heading northwards as well.

== South African units involved ==
- elements - 1 Reconnaissance Regiment
- elements - 4 Reconnaissance Regiment
- elements - 7 Medical Battalion
- SAS Oswald Pirow
- SAS Jim Fouche
- SAS Protea
- SAAF – one Wasp helicopter and a C-130 for radio communication for SAR mission

== Operation ==
On the night of 25 November, the two strike-craft positioned themselves off Luanda, 9 km north-west of the lighthouse at Ponto das Lagostas. Two special forces boats were launched and headed for a point off the shore. Two 4RR divers then entered the water and swam to the beach to ensure the landing point's suitability and its security and then called the boats in to drop off the two-man reconnaissance team. The boats returned to the strike-craft which withdrew 80 km offshore. As the dawn approached, the reconnaissance team found themselves in the middle of military transport storage area, but were able to leave and find a safer hideout during daylight hours. That evening they returned to reconnoitre the transport storage area before proceeding to the refinery, surveilling and photographing the target before returning to their hideout having establishing an inward and exit route for an attack teams. After spending another day at the hideout, on the evening of 27 November, the strike-craft returned and the boats collected the reconnaissance team. The two strike-craft then set off for their rendezvous with the SAS Protea on the early morning of 28 November for refuelling as well as the final planning and briefings of the forthcoming raid and the transfer of the attack teams.

By early evening of 29 November, the two strike-craft were 16 km off Luanda. Four boats were launched for the beach landing site and again dropped off the two reconnaissance team divers to investigate the landing site. The four boats were then signalled to land. A communications team was left on the cliffs to maintain radio contact between the teams and the strike-craft. The HQ and attack teams then proceeded to the outer perimeter fence of the refinery. None of the guard towers appeared to be occupied nor was the inner fence maintained. By 23h57 the four attack teams had cut their way inside the refinery grounds while the support and HQ teams maintaining the security of the exit route. Team 5 guarded the cut fence.

Team 1 proceeded to their target, three distilling towers, but were unable to lay their explosive in the right position as the design of the first tower and a manned control station did not match the intelligence so the explosives were laid on pipes into the tower. Signalling the rest of the teams to begin their arming they proceeded to the second tower that appeared unmanned and out of commission. While attempting to break into the tower they were interrupted by a premature explosion from within the refinery at Team 4's site. They then armed and left the charges at the towers' base and returned to the entrance site.

Team 2's targets were twelve jet fuel tanks. They were able to place six charges before the premature explosion from within the refinery interrupted them. Following orders if the plan changed, they left the remaining charges against a tank and before attempting to arm one of the charges, a second premature explosion occurred within the refinery and so they left the explosives unarmed and returned to the entry point on the fence. Meeting Team 1 they joined in the search of Team 4.

Team 3 managed to lay their charges on two spherical gas tanks and had proceeded to two horizontal tanks when the first premature explosion occurred within the refinery. Orders were now to return to entry point, but finding their route blocked by guards proceeded to another part of the perimeter fence and exited leaving their remaining two charges on pipelines leading to the harbour before returning to the rendezvous point by following the fence.

Team 4 had charges to place on twelve crude oil tanks and they began to place them as soon as Team 1 gave the order to start. About seven minutes after they started, one of their charges prematurely exploded and they decided to place the remaining charges together. Captain de Kok armed one of them, but it exploded and the other two members of the team were injured. One badly team member made it back to the entry point and so Team 1 and 2 re-entered the refinery to find the two missing men and found another team member badly burnt and blinded and returned him to the entry point and resumed their search for the De Kok, but after a third premature explosion it became too dangerous and it was realised he could not have survived.

The men returned to the entry point in the fence and made contact with the HQ team, returning to the beach via the vehicle transport area to save time while more premature explosions occurred in the refinery. The boats were already on the beach waiting and the strike-craft were closer to the shore to speed up the pick-up. The two injured were transferred to individual strike-craft for treatment by medical teams and as soon as the boats were loaded, headed out to sea as several more explosions broke out in the refinery. The two strike-craft would later rendezvous with SAS Protea and transferred the two injured men and latter would then head for Walvis Bay reaching there on 2 December where the men were transported to Pretoria for medical treatment. The two strike-craft left Angolan waters and would arrive back in Langebaan with the 1 & 4 Reconnaissance Regiment teams on 4 December before sailing for Simon's Town later that day to refuel and restock and return to their bases.

== Aftermath ==
Fire-fighters managed to bring the fires under control by 1 December while all fires had been extinguished by 3 December. Angolan and Western oil officials claimed that if the attack had been successful, the city of Luanda would have taken damage from the explosion and the release of poison chemicals. Refinery workers had managed to remove lead tetrachloride, which the South Africans did not know about, from the tanks before the flames got to them.

Kundi Paiama, Angola's Minister of State Security was demoted after the raid because of the security lapses. Several infantry units were called in to guard the complex while security infrastructure within the refinery was upgraded.

The Belgian operators of the refinery estimated the damage to the refinery would be repaired in two months. It was close to three months before partial production began again. Seventeen tanks had been destroyed, but the gas spheres had not exploded even though their contents burnt close the point of the explosion. The South African intelligence reckoned that $60 million of various fuel products had been lost and that the damage was worth $36.5 million.

Jonas Savimbi, leader of UNITA, initially claimed responsibility for the attack by a small assault team firing RPGs. But his version of events did not match the evidence left behind by the attackers.

By the 1 December, Angolan officials presented evidence to Western diplomats that the attack had been carried out by South African "mercenaries". It appeared that SADF special forces member, Captain AJP de Kock, was killed instantly when demolition explosives he was laying, prematurely exploded. His remains, the mines, weapons and other sabotage equipment that was left behind were presented to the world's media.

The raid was acknowledged as a South African special forces operation during the final report of the Truth and Reconciliation Commission.
