= SAS Jan Smuts =

History

South Africa
- Name: SAS Jan Smuts
- Namesake: Prime Minister Jan Smuts
- Operator: South African Navy
- Builder: Israel Shipyards Ltd, Haifa, Israel.
- Launched: 18 February 1977
- Commissioned: 8 July 1977
- Decommissioned: 2003
- Home port: Durban

General characteristics
- Class & type: Warrior class strike craft
- Type: Missile boat
- Displacement: 415 tons (450 tons full loaded)
- Length: 58 m (190 ft)
- Beam: 7.62 m (25.0 ft)
- Draught: 2.4 m (7.9 ft)
- Propulsion: 4 MTU 16V 538 diesel engines, four shafts, total of 12,800 hp (9,500 kW)
- Speed: 34 knots (63 km/h; 39 mph)
- Range: 4,000 nmi (7,400 km; 4,600 mi) at 17.5 kn (32.4 km/h); 1,650 nmi (3,060 km; 1,900 mi) at 30 kn (56 km/h; 35 mph)
- Complement: 45 officers and crewmen

SAS Jan Smuts was a Minister-class strike craft of the South African Navy.

The SAS Jan Smuts was the first of the Minister class to be built and initially launched with only a pennant number, P1561. She arrived in Simon's Town in September 1977 under the command of Commander Robert Simpson-Anderson. She was later named SAS Jan Smuts after former Prime Minister Jan Smuts.

When the strike craft were renamed in 1997, the SAS Jan Smuts was the only one to retain her original name.

She was withdrawn from service on 20 March 1998 and sold for scrap.

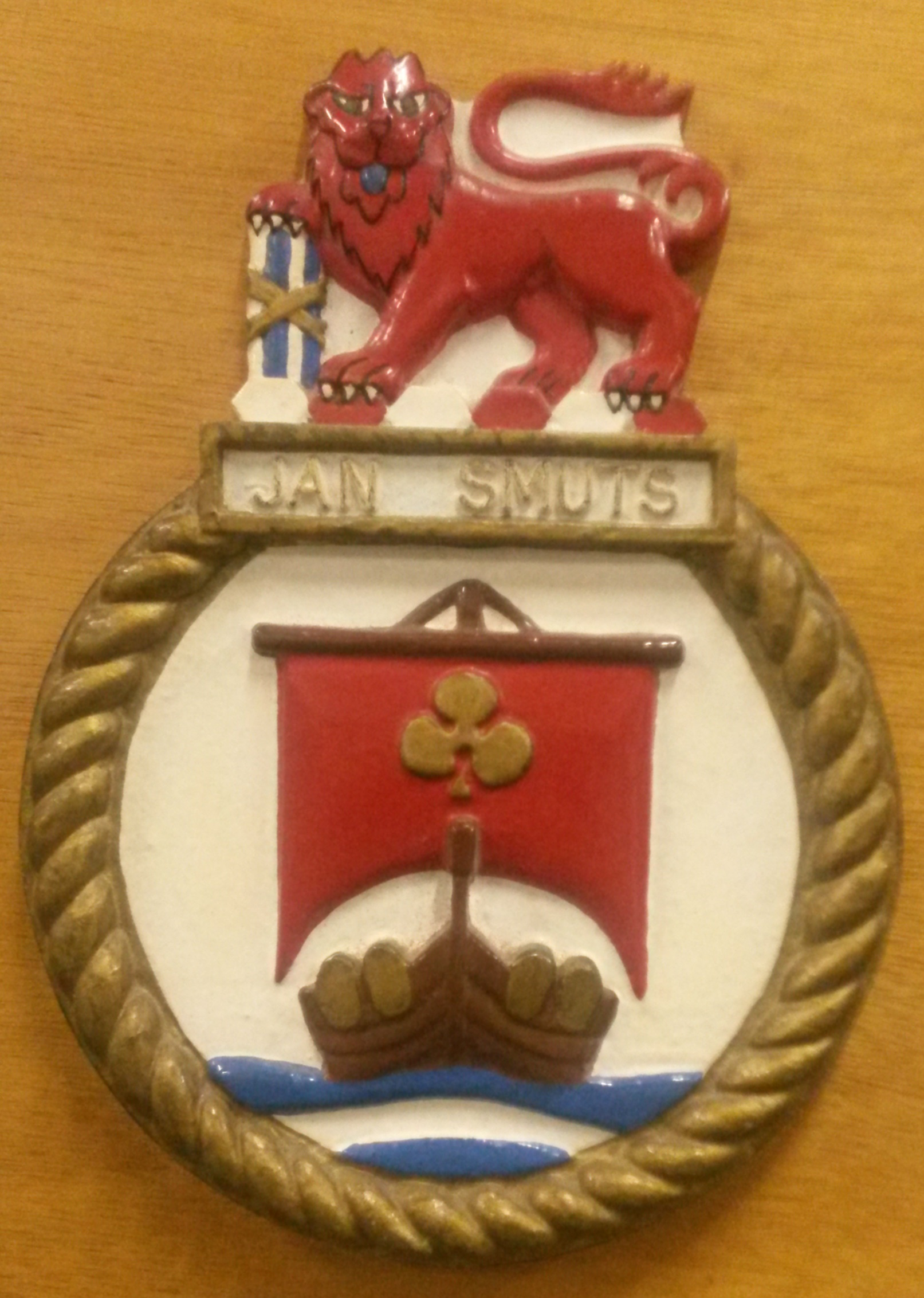
Ship's badge in the Naval Museum
