= SAS Makhanda =

Warrior-class strike craft of the South African Navy

History

South Africa
- Name: SAS Makhanda
- Namesake: named for the Xhosa warrior Makhanda
- Operator: South African Navy
- Builder: Sandock Austral, Durban
- Commissioned: 4 July 1986
- Home port: Naval Base Durban
- Status: in active service

General characteristics
- Class & type: Warrior class strike craft
- Type: Missile boat
- Displacement: 415 tons (450 tons full loaded)
- Length: 58 m (190 ft)
- Beam: 7.62 m (25.0 ft)
- Draught: 2.4 m (7.9 ft)
- Propulsion: 4 MTU 16V 538 diesel engines, four shafts, total of 12,800 hp (9,500 kW)
- Speed: 34 knots (63 km/h; 39 mph)
- Range: 4,000 nmi (7,400 km; 4,600 mi) at 17.5 kn (32.4 km/h); 1,650 nmi (3,060 km; 1,900 mi) at 30 kn (56 km/h; 35 mph)
- Complement: 45 officers and crewmen

SAS Makhanda (formerly SAS Magnus Malan) is a Warrior-class strike craft of the South African Navy, currently configured as an Offshore Patrol Vessel.

She was commissioned in 1986 and originally named SAS Magnus Malan for South African Party minister of defence Magnus Malan, she was renamed on 1 April 1997. She was converted in 2012/2013 to an Offshore Patrol Vessel role.

The SAS Makhanda is currently employed with anti piracy patrols.
