= SAS Drakensberg =

Fleet replenishment ship (AOR) of the South African Navy

- SAS Drakensberg

History

South Africa
- Name: SAS Drakensberg
- Namesake: Drakensberg mountain range
- Operator: South African Navy
- Builder: Sandock-Austral, Durban
- Laid down: 30 August 1984
- Launched: 24 April 1986
- Commissioned: 11 November 1987
- Identification: IMO number: 8644060; MMSI number: 460100910; Callsign: ZTRP
- Status: in active service

General characteristics
- Class & type: Replenishment oiler (AOR)
- Displacement: 12,500 tons full load (6,000 tons light)
- Length: 147 m (482 ft)
- Beam: 19.5 m (64 ft)
- Draft: 7.9 m (25.9 ft)
- Propulsion: 2×6600 kW B&W (Note: The SA Navy website incorrectly lists the engine manufacturer as BMW) V12 engines driving a single variable-pitch propeller. Bow thruster
- Speed: 21+ knots
- Range: 8,000 nautical miles (15,000 km) at 15 knots (28 km/h)
- Complement: 14 officers, 101 enlisted
- Armament: 4× Oerlikon 20 mm cannon; 6 × 12,7 mm Browning machine guns
- Aircraft carried: 2× Atlas Oryx helicopters
- Aviation facilities: 2 hangars

SAS Drakensberg (A301) is a fleet replenishment ship (AOR) of the South African Navy (SAN), with the primary role of assisting and supporting the SAN's combat vessels at sea. Built by the Sandock Austral Shipyards in Durban, it is the largest and most sophisticated warship to have been built in South Africa.

== Design ==
The design and shortcomings of Tafelberg heavily influenced the designers of Drakensberg. Drakensberg is able to carry 5,500 tons of diesel fuel, 210 tons of fresh water, 100 tons of dry provisions, over 30 tons of frozen food, 230 tons of containerized cargo or 1,000 tons of palletized and general cargo. The loading and offloading of this cargo is made possible with one 20-ton crane, four 2-ton cranes and a 5-ton hoist, assisted by two lifts of 2.5 and 7.5 tons respectively. Replenishment at sea (RAS) is from two abeam positions or from the RAS deck astern, with the ability to pump 40 tons of fuel per hour and 15 tons of fresh water per hour. In addition, an on-board plant enables the ship to produce 50,000 litres (11,000 imp gal; 13,000 US gal) of fresh water from sea water daily.

The ship carries two rigid-hulled inflatable boats (RHIB) called 'Stingrays' for small-craft duties, as well as two Delta-80 LCUs for limited amphibious use.

== Operational history ==
In 1988 Drakensberg set sail along with SAS Frans Erasmus for Chile on 15 February, returning to South Africa on 15 April. This was followed two years later in May 1990, when Drakensberg accompanied the strike craft SAS Jan Smuts and Hendrik Mentz on a voyage to Keelung in Taiwan, without stopping at any ports along the way (a procedure necessitated by South Africa's political isolation at the time). This was the first time since 1945 that a South African naval vessel had "shown the flag" in the Far East; it also provided an opportunity for joint exercises with the Taiwanese Navy.

Under Operation Pullen in 1990, Drakensberg became the first South African naval vessel to visit the then-Zaire in over 30 years, laying the groundwork for a series of additional visits to African nations, signifying South Africa's gradual return from isolation. The next year, it set sail on a humanitarian relief mission, offloading 630 tons of supplies in Chittagong, Bangladesh, and 35 tons of supplies in Mersin, Turkey. In 1992, it became the first SAN vessel to proceed further south than 54 degrees south latitude, in a mission to assist the damaged S. A. Agulhas.

Operation Narsau in May 1994, followed South Africa's first fully democratic elections and the election of Nelson Mandela. In three months, it visited Lisbon, Rosyth, Copenhagen, Rotterdam, Zeebrugge, Rouen, London, Cádiz, São Tomé and Príncipe, Bioko Island and Gabon in the process becoming the first SAN vessel to visit Denmark and Belgium. In 1995 it made another voyage to Abu Dhabi, Karachi, Mumbai and Muscat.

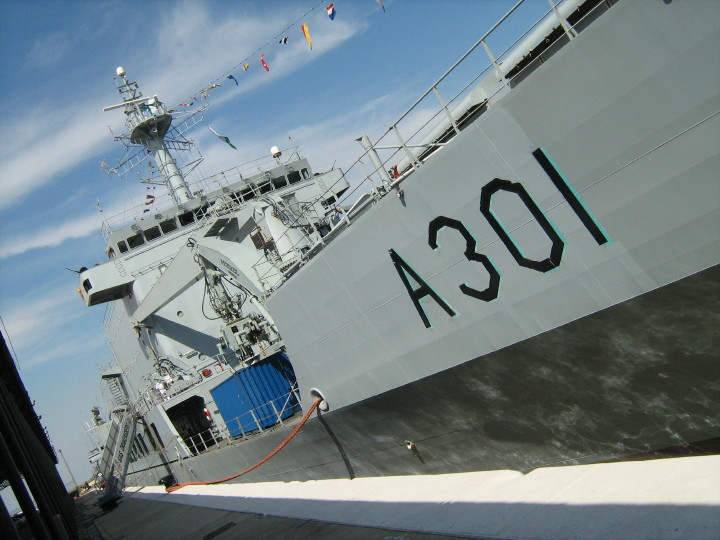
SAS Drakensberg, Buenos Aires (2010)

In 1996, Drakensberg became the first SAN vessel in over 20 years to visit the United States, when it called at the ports of Norfolk, Newport and New York City, which followed a naval exercise with over 25 other vessels at the US Navy's base at Roosevelt Roads, Puerto Rico. Three years later Drakensberg embarked on another long-range voyage, this time to Brazil, Argentina and Uruguay to partake in the Atlasur IV naval manoeuvres.

In 2006, Drakensberg was sent to Antwerpen Belgium by President Thabo Mbeki to collect a giant rotor to replace the damaged rotor at Koeberg nuclear power station.

In 2011, Drakensberg was sent to West Africa, officially for training purposes. The deployment drew criticism from the Economic Community of West African States (ECOWAS), who claimed that the deployment was related to ongoing conflict in Côte d'Ivoire.

In 2020, Drakensberg engaged in counter-piracy patrols off the coast of Mozambique.

== See also ==
- List of ships of the South African Navy
