= SAS Galeshewe =

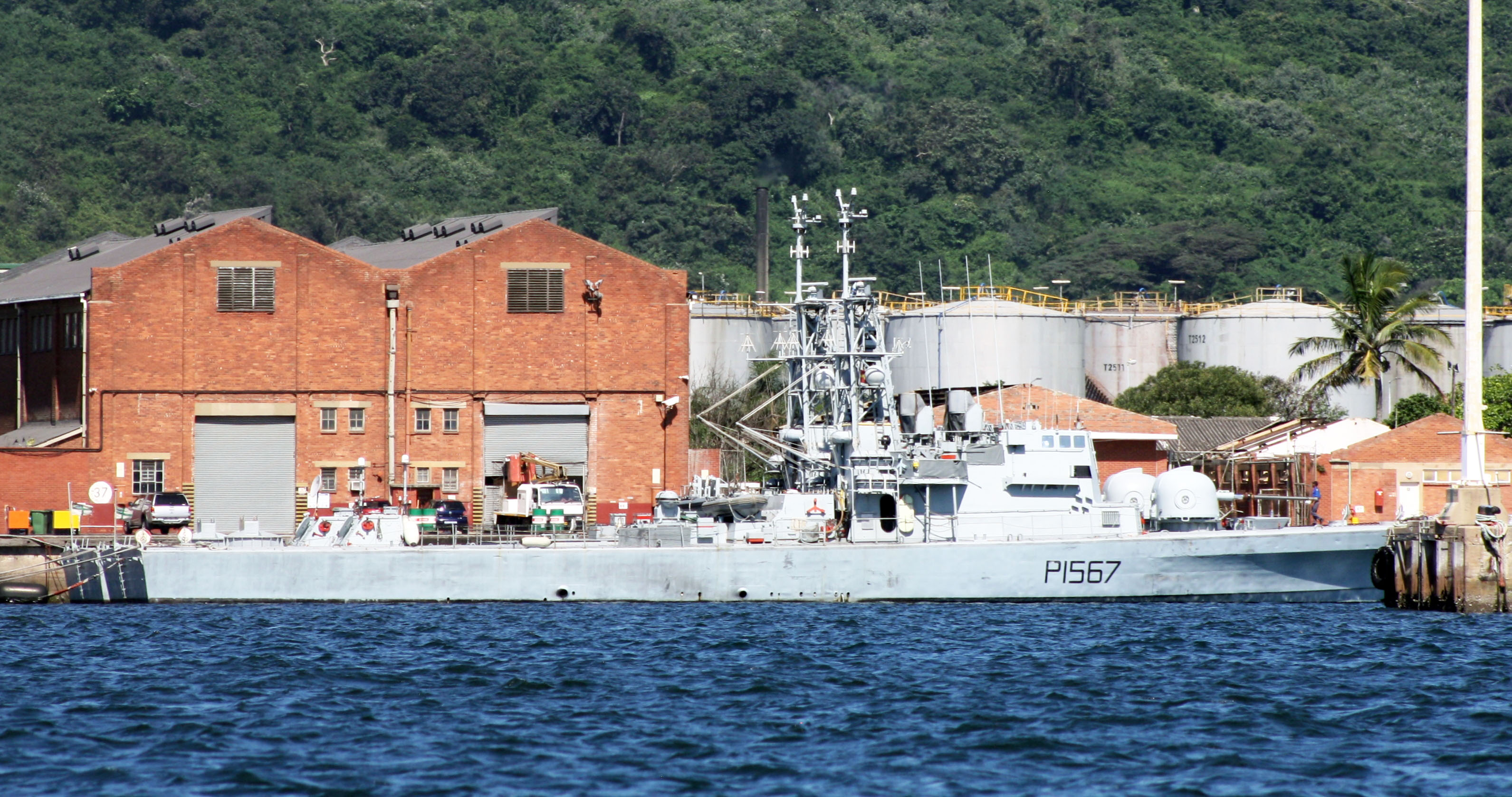

History

South Africa
- Name: SAS Galeshewe
- Namesake: renamed for the Tlhaping tribe's chief Galeshewe
- Operator: South African Navy
- Builder: Sandock Austral, Durban
- Launched: 26 Mar 1982
- Commissioned: 11 Feb 1983
- Decommissioned: 8 Oct 2020
- Home port: Durban
- Status: Decommissioned

General characteristics
- Class & type: Warrior class strike craft
- Type: Missile boat
- Displacement: 415 tons (450 tons full loaded)
- Length: 58 m (190 ft)
- Beam: 7.62 m (25.0 ft)
- Draught: 2.4 m (7.9 ft)
- Propulsion: 4 MTU 16V 538 diesel engines, four shafts, total of 12,800 hp (9,500 kW)
- Speed: 34 knots (63 km/h; 39 mph)
- Range: 4,000 nmi (7,400 km; 4,600 mi) at 17.5 kn (32.4 km/h); 1,650 nmi (3,060 km; 1,900 mi) at 30 kn (56 km/h; 35 mph)
- Complement: 45 officers and crewmen

SAS Galeshewe was a Warrior-class strike craft of the South African Navy, configured as an Offshore Patrol Vessel before being decommissioned in 2020.

She was commissioned in 1983 and originally named SAS Hendrik Mentz for South African Party minister of defence Hendrik Mentz; she was renamed SAS Galeshewe on 1 April 1997. She was upgraded in 2012/2013 to an Offshore Patrol Vessel role.

Before decommissioning, the SAS Galeshewe was used for anti piracy patrols.
