= SAS Isaac Dyobha =

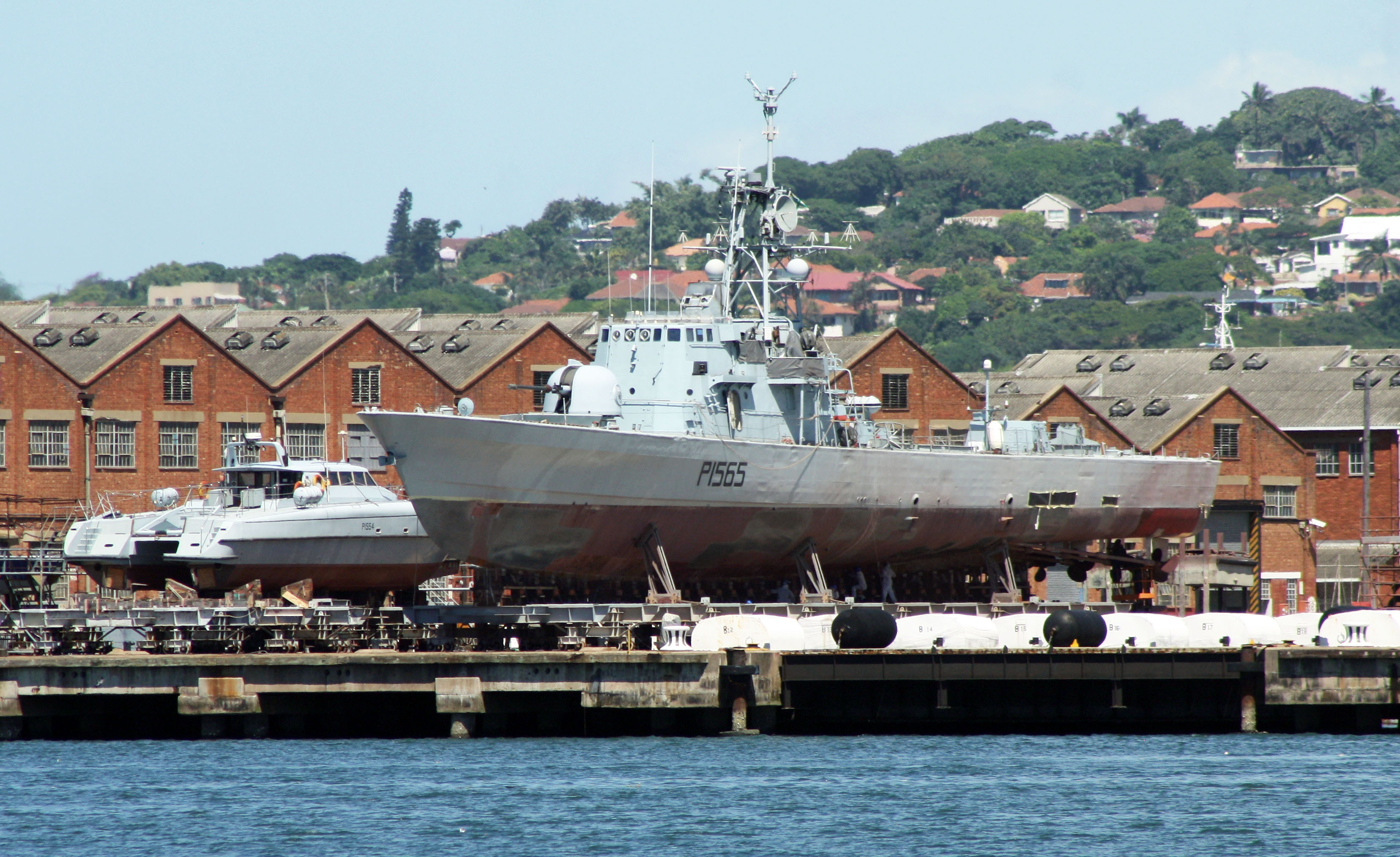

History

South Africa
- Name: SAS Isaac Dyobha
- Namesake: Reverend Isaac Dyobha, a chaplain in the South African Native Labour Corps who died in the sinking of the SS Mendi in 1917
- Operator: South African Navy
- Builder: Sandock Austral, Durban
- Laid down: 16 Mar 1979
- Commissioned: 27 July 1979
- Decommissioned: 2022
- Home port: Durban
- Status: Decommissioned

General characteristics
- Class & type: Warrior class strike craft
- Type: Missile boat
- Displacement: 415 tons (450 tons full loaded)
- Length: 58 m (190 ft)
- Beam: 7.62 m (25.0 ft)
- Draught: 2.4 m (7.9 ft)
- Propulsion: 4 MTU 16V 538 diesel engines, four shafts, total of 12,800 hp (9,500 kW)
- Speed: 34 knots (63 km/h; 39 mph)
- Range: 4,000 nmi (7,400 km; 4,600 mi) at 17.5 kn (32.4 km/h); 1,650 nmi (3,060 km; 1,900 mi) at 30 kn (56 km/h; 35 mph)
- Complement: 45 officers and crewmen
- Armament: 1 OTO Melara 76 mm

SAS Isaac Dyobha was a Warrior-class strike craft of the South African Navy.

She was commissioned in 1979 and originally named SAS Frans Erasmus for former National Party cabinet minister Frans Erasmus and launched by his widow. She was renamed on 1 April 1997. She was upgraded in 2012/2013 to an Offshore Patrol Vessel role by removing one of her OTO Melara 76 mm guns and her scorpion missile launchers.

From 2013 the SAS Isaac Dyobha was employed on anti piracy patrols. She was decommissioned in 2022.
