= Sandock-Austral =

Sandock-Austral was a South African defence company formed through the 1971 merger of the Austral armaments company and Sandock Ltd dockyards, as a subsidiary of the Gencor mining group.

The company was absorbed into Land Systems OMC, part of BAE Systems.

Sandock-Austral has developed a number of notable products, such as:

- The Ratel infantry fighting vehicle.
- The Eland Mk2 armoured car.
- The Mamba Mk2 and Romad series of mine-protected armoured personnel carriers.

It was also responsible for the construction of the SAS Drakensberg, South Africa's most sophisticated indigenous warship.
