= SAS Mendi =

2003 Valour-class frigate

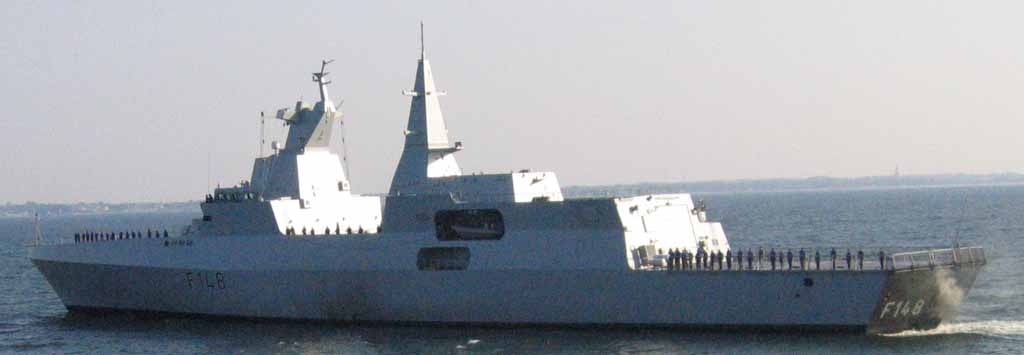
- SAS Mendi

History

South Africa
- Name: SAS Mendi
- Namesake: SS Mendi
- Ordered: 3 December 1999
- Builder: Howaldtswerke-Deutsche Werft, Kiel
- Laid down: 28 June 2002
- Launched: October 2003
- Commissioned: 20 March 2007
- Home port: Simonstown
- Identification: F148
- Status: Active service

General characteristics
- Class & type: Valour-class frigate
- Displacement: 3,700 tons
- Length: 121 m (397 ft)
- Beam: 16.34 m (53.6 ft)
- Draught: 5.95 m (19.5 ft)
- Propulsion: CODAG WARP; 2 × Diesels 5,920 kW (7,939 hp) each; 2 shafts; 1 × Gas turbine 20,000 kW (26,820 hp); 1 waterjet
- Speed: 30 knots (56 km/h; 35 mph)
- Range: 8,000 nautical miles (15,000 km) at 16 knots (30 km/h)
- Complement: 152
- Sensors & processing systems: Surveillance Radar: Thales Naval France MRR-3D NG G-band multi-role radar; Optical Radar Tracker: 2 Reutech RTS 6400 monopulse X-band (I/J bands) combined radar and optronics trackers; Electro-optical Tracker: Reutech Electro-optical tracker; Identification Friend or Foe: Tellumat Integrated Naval IFF system; Target Designation Sights: M-Tek Target Designation Sights; Sonar: Thales UMS4132 Kingklip sonar; Obstacle avoidance sonar: MDS 3060
- Electronic warfare & decoys: ESM/ECM: Saab Grintek Avitronics SME 100/200 ESM (Intercept and Jammer) & ELINT; Decoys: 2 Saab Grintek Avitronics MRL Super Barricade chaff launchers (96 decoys)
- Armament: 1 × Otobreda 76 mm gun; 1 × twin-barreled 35 mm (Denel) dual-purpose gun; 2 × Oerlikon 20 mm cannon Mk1; 8 × MBDA MM40 Exocet Block 2 SSM (2 × 4-cell launchers); 16 × Umkhonto SAM (2 × 8-cell vertical launchers)
- Aircraft carried: 1 × SuperLynx 300 (can carry 2)
- Aviation facilities: Flight deck; Enclosed hangar

SAS Mendi (F148) is the last of four Valour-class frigates built for the South African Navy by the European South African Corvette Consortium and entered service in March 2007. SAS Mendi was named by Mrs Helena Retief, wife of the (then) Chief of the Navy Vice Admiral Johan Retief.

== Construction ==
Mendi, as with all the Valour-class vessels, was manufactured by the European South African Corvette Consortium (ESACC), consisting of the German Frigate Consortium (Blohm+Voss, Thyssen Rheinstahl and Howaldtswerke Deutsche Werf), African Defence Systems (part of the French Thales defence group) and a number of South African companies.

The ships were built to the MEKO modular design concept, and are designated by the manufacturer as the MEKO A-200SAN class. Some controversy exists as to the class type of the vessel, with both the manufacturer and the South African Navy referring to her as a "corvette", but other similar vessels in other navies being referred to as frigates.

SAS Mendi was built at the Howaldtswerke-Deutsche Werft shipyards in Kiel, Germany, and arrived in South Africa on 20 September 2004.

== Status ==
According to a presentation made to the Joint Standing Committee on Defence by Rear Admiral B.K. Mhlana, Deputy Chief of the Navy in May 2023, Mendi had been scheduled for refits in both 2013 and 2019 but no work had been done to date. Her mid-life update was scheduled for 2024. The admiral described the frigate as the only vessel of the class still effectively operational.

== Namesake ==
As with all the other ships of the Valour class, Mendi is named after a famous South African battle or instance of great valour. In this case the sinking of SS Mendi in the English Channel during World War I. On the 23 August 2004, en route from the shipyards to South Africa, SAS Mendi and HMS Nottingham, a Type 42 destroyer, met at the site where SS Mendi sank and lay wreaths in remembrance of those who died in service for their country

== Notable deployments ==
- A deployment to Brazil and Ghana from Aug to Sep 2007
- Operation Boniso 2004
- Operational Sea Training Phase training with the German Navy
- Exercising with the French frigate Nivôse off Cape Point
- Conducted Exocet MM 40 missile firings with SAS Isandlwana in 2007
- Exercise Red Lion
- Exercised with HMS Southampton off Cape Town
- On 5 September 2008 Mendi led seven of the South African Navy's newest vessels in a Presidential Fleet Review, the first to be held in South Africa since the 75th anniversary of the Navy in 1997.
- Since 2011, SAS Mendi has intermittently been deployed on anti-piracy operations in the Mozambique Channel as part of Operation Copper. All four Valour-class frigates, SAS Drakensberg, and two of the SAN's offshore patrol vessels (OPVs) have intermittently spent time on station since the operation began.

== Repair and return to operational status ==
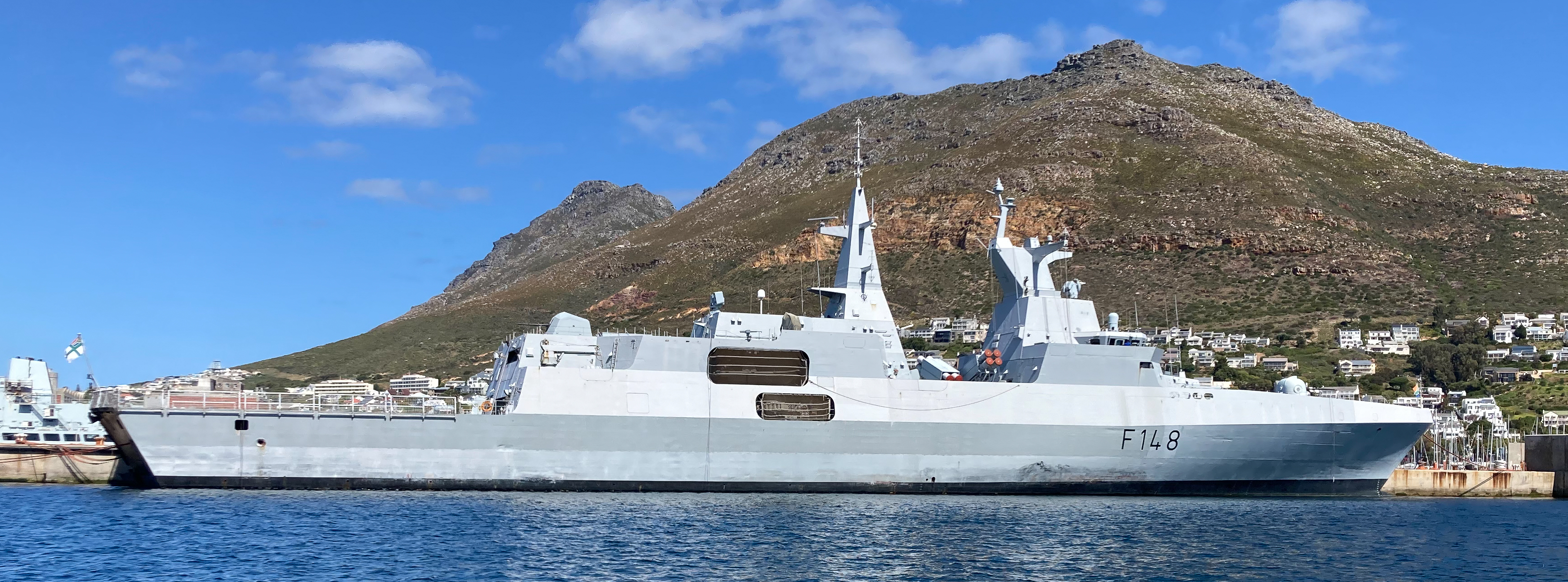
SAS Mendi in 2022

As of 2021 SAS Mendi was reported to be in reasonable shape and was being brought back to operational status through a staged maintenance and repair program. However, it was also reported that there still remained: "much work ahead. As long dormant systems are used again, small kinks and issues will show and must be ironed out”.

In February 2023, Mendi participated in joint South African-Russian-Chinese exercises (exercise Mosi II) which involved the frigate Admiral Gorshkov and tanker Kama from the Russian Navy along with the destroyer Huainan, the frigate Rizhao and the support ship Kekexilihu from the Chinese Navy, as well as other smaller units from the South African Navy.
