= Warrior-class strike craft =

Fast attack craft in the South African Navy

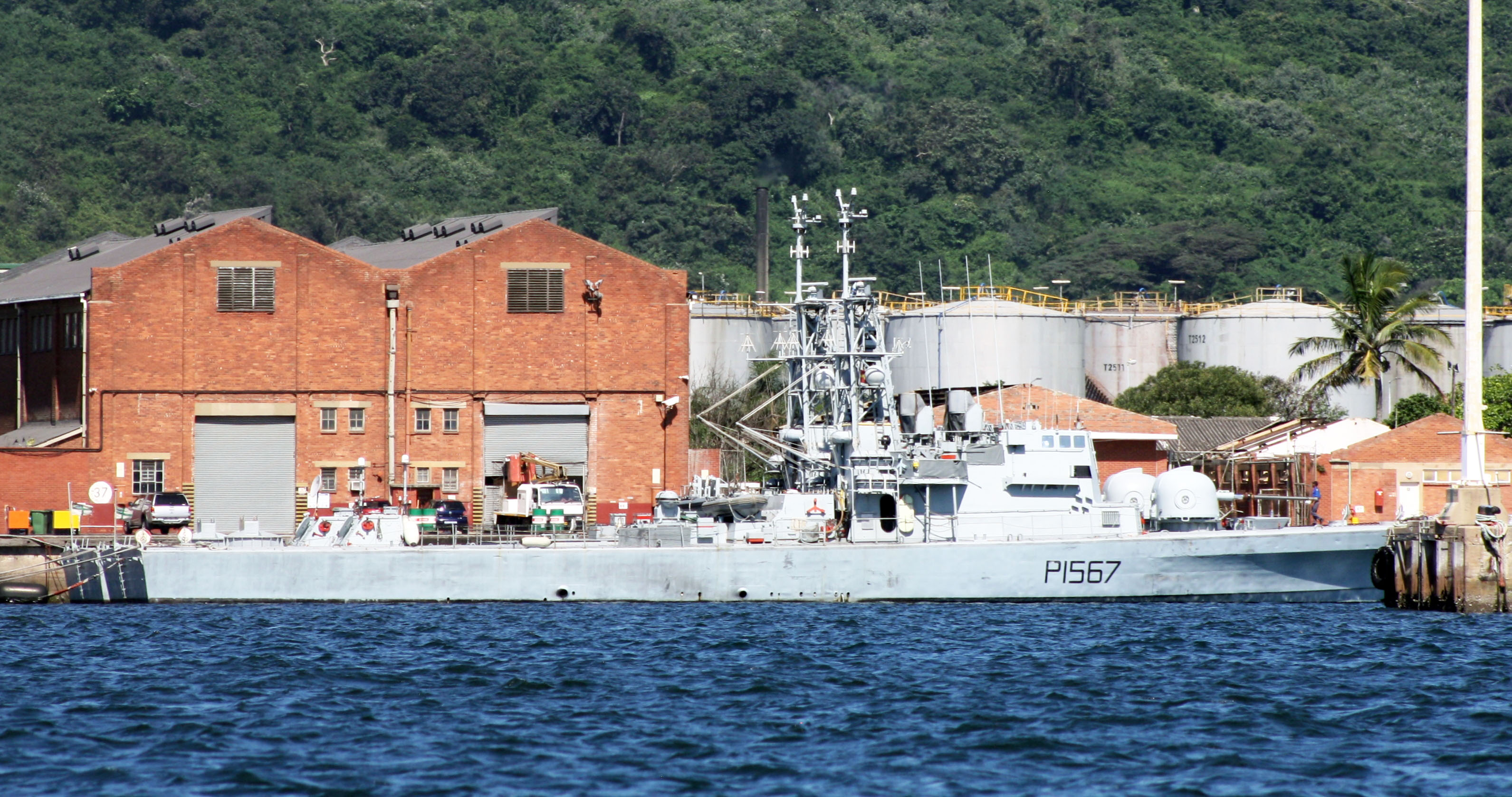
- SAS Galeshewe

Class overview
- Name: Warrior-class strike craft
- Builders: Israeli Military Industries; Sandock-Austral
- Operators: South African Navy
- Built: 9
- In commission: 1
- Completed: 9

The Warrior-class strike craft (ex Minister class) are in service with the South African Navy, with the design being a modified Sa'ar 4 (Reshef)-class fast attack craft. The class was initially known as the Minister class as all the boats were named after South African Ministers of Defence, before being renamed Warrior-class after 1994. The strike craft flotilla was known as SAS Scorpion.

== History ==
In March 1971, a South African project team visited Britain, France and Portugal to investigate alternative designs for future frigates or corvettes. A decision was made to buy corvettes from Portugal, with four ships of an upgraded version of the João Coutinho class being ordered. However, due to the changing of the political climate in Portugal following the 1974 Carnation Revolution, the new Portuguese authorities cancelled the transference of the corvettes to South Africa, instead integrating them in the Portuguese Navy, where they formed the Baptista de Andrade class.

The then Minister of Defence, P. W. Botha, had already started discussions with Israel to buy their Reshef-class missile boats, designated Project Japonica.

In 1974, a contract was signed with Israeli Military Industries for the construction of three of the modified Reshef-class vessels at the Haifa facility of Israeli Shipyards. A further three were built immediately after at the Sandock-Austral shipyard in Durban, South Africa, with three more being built at the same facility several years later. The imposition of the international embargo on the sale of arms to South Africa on 4 November 1977 forced the project to be carried out under a cloak of security. The South African variants were fitted with Gabriel missiles, otherwise known as 'Scorpion' missiles, and had two Oto Melara 76 mm guns instead of a single one with a Phalanx CIWS.

=== SAS Scorpion ===
With the arrival of the strike craft, a strike craft flotilla was formed in 1977 under the command of Captain Glen Syndercombe. This flotilla was renamed SAS Scorpion in 1980.

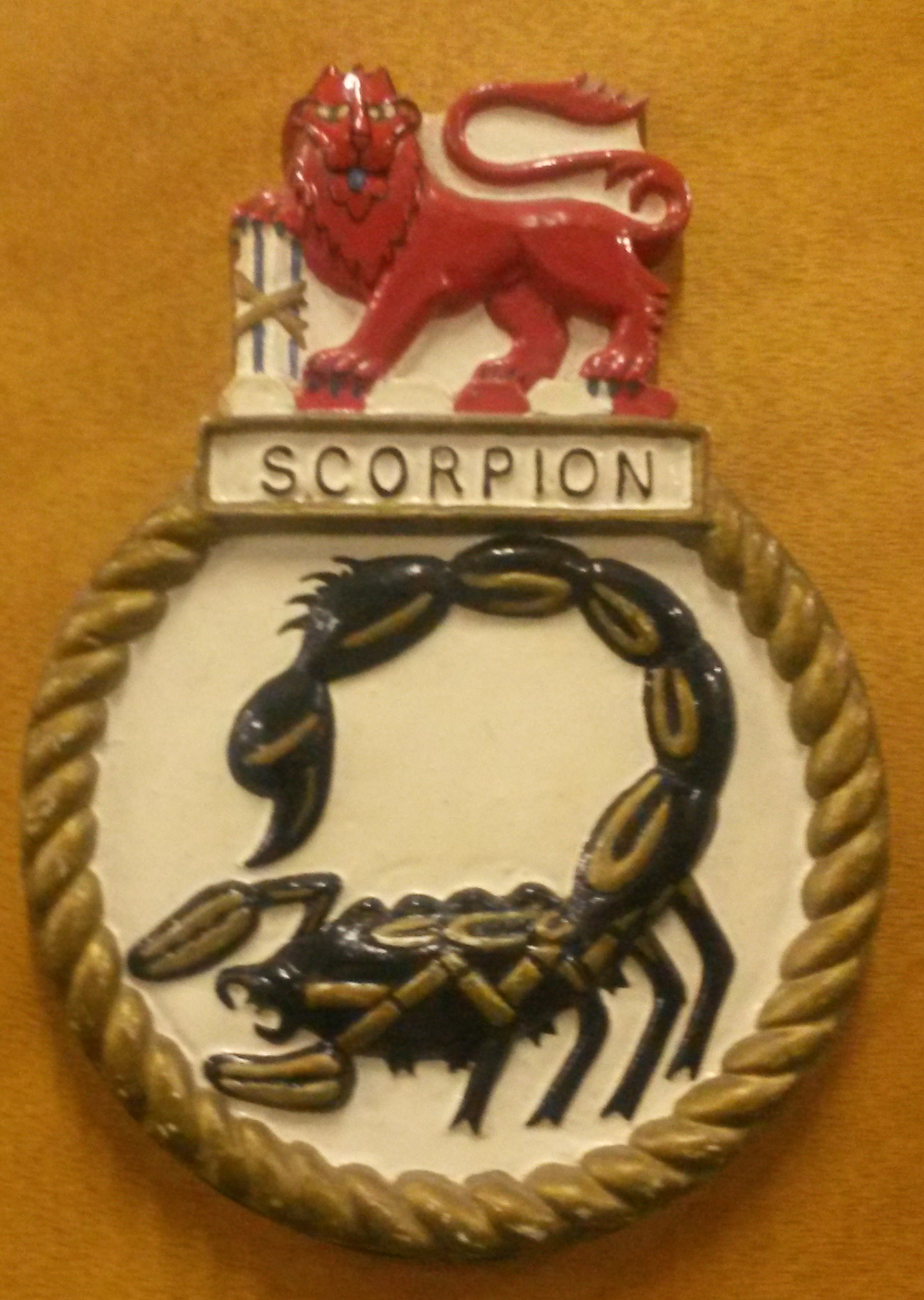
SAS Scorpion crest

The flotilla was formed into two squadrons in 1985, with four ships being in service at one time in Squadron 1 and two in service with Squadron 2, which was based in Simon's Town.

== Conversion to Offshore Patrol Vessel ==
Three decommissioned Warrior-class strike craft were refurbished by SA Shipyards and recommissioned as offshore patrol vessels (OPVs) from 2012 to 2014. Their aged Skerpioen missile launchers were removed, providing extra room for a small RHIB boat and a small contingent of seaborne commandos to board suspect vessels. Re-classed as OPVs, these vessels are armed with one OTO Melara 76 mm naval artillery gun, the rear one of the two originally fitted having been removed, as well as a pair of 20mm guns and a pair of 12.7mm heavy machine guns. Rear Admiral Hanno Teuteberg, Chief Director Maritime Strategy, said in 2013 that the early indications are that the life of the OPV vessels can be extended for at least five or more years, to coincide with Project Biro, the new build Offshore/Inshore patrol vessel project.

Three of the former strike craft were refurbished and recommissioned as SAS Isaac Dyobha (P1565), SAS Galeshewe (P1567) and SAS Makhanda (P1569). As of 2023, only SAS Makhanda remains in active service. Her home port is Naval Base Durban, which is undergoing an upgrade in preparation for the new patrol flotilla which will consist of similarly named Warrior Class Inshore Patrol Vessels currently under construction.

== Ships in Class ==
A total of 9 boats were delivered to the South African Navy.

Name	Previous names	Pennant	Commissioned	Decommissioned	Fate	Notes
	SAS Jan Smuts	P1561	8 July 1977	2004	Scrapped 2004	Built by Israel Shipyards Ltd, Haifa, Israel. Originally named after PM of Union of South Africa Jan Smuts.
SAS Shaka	SAS P.W. Botha	P1562	2 December 1977	2005	Sunk as target 2005	Built by Israel Shipyards Ltd, Haifa, Israel. Originally named for former President of South Africa Pieter Willem Botha.
SAS Adam Kok	SAS Frederic Creswell	P1563	6 April 1978		Awaiting 'sale and/or destruction'	Built by Israel Shipyards Ltd, Haifa, Israel. Originally named for South African Labour Party minister Frederic Creswell and renamed for black South African leader Adam Kok III. Stripped and towed to Simon's Town. Deemed surplus, awaiting tenders for 'sale and/or destruction'.
SAS Sekhukhuni	SAS Jim Fouché	P1564	22 December 1978	2005	Sunk as target 2005	Built by Sandock-Austral, Durban, South Africa. Originally named after the 2nd State President of South Africa Jacobus Johannes Fouché.
SAS Isaac Dyobha	SAS Frans Erasmus	P1565	27 July 1979	2022	Decommissioned in 2022	Named for former National Party cabinet minister Frans Erasmus; renamed after the Reverend Isaac Dyobha, a chaplain in the South African Native Labour Corps who died in the sinking of the SS Mendi in 1917.
SAS René Sethren	SAS Oswald Pirow	P1566	4 March 1980		Scrapped	Built by Sandock-Austral, Durban, South Africa. Originally named after National Party minister Oswald Pirow and renamed for decorated HMSAS officer René Sethren CGM.
SAS Galeshewe	SAS Hendrik Mentz	P1567	11 Feb 1983	2020	Decommissioned in 2020. In Reserve.	Named for South African Party minister of defence Hendrik Mentz; renamed for the Tlhaping tribe's chief Galeshewe.
SAS Job Masego	SAS Kobie Coetsee	P1568	11 February 1983	2008	Sold for scrap	Built by Sandock-Austral, Durban, South Africa. Originally named after National Party politician Kobie Coetsee; renamed after Cpl Job Masego of the Native Military Corps.
SAS Makhanda	SAS Magnus Malan	P1569	4 July 1986	-	In service	Built by Sandock-Austral, Durban, South Africa. Originally named after National Party politician and Chief of the South African Defense Force Magnus Malan; converted to an OPV in 2014. Likely to be decommissioned 2023.

== See also ==
- List of decommissioned ships of the South African Navy
- List of ships of the South African Navy
