= List of decommissioned ships of the South African Navy =

The following is a list of decommissioned ships of the South African Navy.

== Pennant numbers ==
South African Navy used the below pennant number prefix designations:

- A — auxiliaries
- C — cruisers
- D — destroyers
- F — frigates
- H — shore signal stations (military); survey vessels
- K — miscellaneous vessels
- L — amphibious warfare ships
- M — minesweepers
- N — minelayers
- P — patrol boats
- R — aircraft carriers
- S — submarines
- T — trawler (converted: WWII)
- Y — yard vessels

=== 1944 change to pennant numbers ===
South African Navy vessels pennant numbers T01-T62 used numbers that were duplicated with the Royal Navy. In 1944, South African Navy vessel pennant numbers were changed to eliminate this duplication. 500 was added to pennant numbers T01-21, 440 was added to pennant numbers T22-39 and 400 was added to numbers T40-61. Thus as an example, T40 became T440 and T05 became T505. In the below tables, pennant numbers in parentheses indicate the revised number applicable after 1944.

== Battle Honours ==
The Battle Honours listed in the below tables makes use of an abbreviated form. The full description for each category is below:

- South Africa Waters 1939-1945: For operations within a radius of 1000 nautical miles of the South African coast, including South West Africa
- Indian Ocean 1939-1945: For operations in the Indian Ocean, excluding an area within a radius of 1000 nautical miles of the South African coast.
- Atlantic 1939-1945: For operations in the north Atlantic from the Equator to the Arctic Circle
- North Sea 1939-1945: For operations in the North Sea and all waters to the eastward between Southend and the Shetland Islands.
- English Channel 1939-1945: For operations in the English Channel and all waters of the south coast between Southend and Bristol, the western limit being a line drawn from Ushant to the Scilly Islands and thence to the north coast of Cornwall.
- Libya 1940-1942: For operations in-shore between Port Said and Benghazi
- Mediterranean 1940-1945: For operations in the whole of the Mediterranean, the western limit being a line joining Cape Spartel and Cape Trafalgar.
- Sicily 1943: For operations in support of the Allied invasion of Sicily.
- Aegean 1943-1944: For operations in all waters of the Aegean Archipelago between 35 and 42 degrees north and 22-32 degrees east.
- Italy 1943-1945: For operations in support of the Italian campaign.
- South France 1944: For operations in support of the invasion of the South of France.
- Pacific 1942-1945: For operations in the Pacific Ocean.

== Pre-Union of South Africa ==
These vessels were operated by the pre-Union entities before the formation of the Union of South Africa in 1910.

Class	Name	Previous names	Pennant	Commissioned	Decommissioned	Fate	Notes
Paddle tug	Forerunner			July 1893	1905	Wrecked, Durban in May 1905	Forerunner was a shallow draft steam-powered paddle-tug used to tow vessels over the sandbar at the entrance to Durban bay. It was decommissioned by the Natal Government in 1885 and transferred to the Natal Naval Volunteers as a store- and headquarters ship in July 1893.

== Mine laying and anti-mine vessels ==
=== Mine layers ===
Class	Name	Previous names	Pennant	Commissioned	Decommissioned	Battle Honours	Fate	Notes
Controlled minelayer	SAS Skilpad	German trawler Polaris; HMS Spindrift (1940); HMSAS Spindrift (1943); HMSAS Skilpad (1951)		5 July 1943		S Afr Waters: 1944–45	Sank at her berth at Salisbury Island on 22 July 1953 during a NE gale. Although considerable efforts were made to raise her, the ship never went back to sea again and was eventually sold for scrap in May 1957.	Originally German trawler Polaris, captured by HMS Arrow off Norway on 26 April 1940. Displacement 926 tons. Length 160' with Compound Uniflow Lentz valve motors. Broken up in Durban in 1957.

=== Minesweeping whalers ===
Class	Name	Previous names	Pennant	Commissioned	Decommissioned	Battle Honours	Fate	Notes
Hektor class	HMSAS Soetvlei	MV Hektor 3 (1929); MV Uni XII (1946)	T22 (T462)	1940	1946	S Afr Waters: 1940–45	1946 Sold to Union Whaling Co. Ltd (Abraham E. Larsen), Durban, South Africa and renamed UNI XII. Wrecked on 13 August 1954 on a rock at Umdoni Point, Natal, South Africa. One man lost.	Built as whale catcher by A/S Jarlsø Verft, Tønsberg for A/S Hektor (Nils Bugge), Tønsberg in 1929 and was sold to Hektoria Ltd (Nils Bugge, Tønsberg), Cape Town, South Africa in 1932. Requisitioned by the South African Navy in 1940 and equipped for minesweeper service, renamed HMSAS Soetvlei. Vessel was sold to Union Government of South Africa in 1945.
Hektor class	HMSAS Brakvlei	MV Hektor 4	T23 (T463)	July 1940	June 1946	S Afr Waters: 1940–45	Transferred to Africa Palestine Fish Industries Ltd., Cape Town as MV Drom Africa II in June 1946	Sold for scrap in 1982 after many prior owners.
Hektor class	HMSAS Hektor	MV Hektor 5	T24 (T464)	July 1940	June 1946	S Afr Waters: 1940–45	Transferred to The Union Whaling Co.Ltd., Durban in 1946 as MV UNI XIV.	Broken up in 1959
	HMSAS Swartberg	MV Zwartberg; HMS Swartberg	T09 (T509)			S Afr Waters: 1939–45	Wrecked in 1955	220-ton whale catcher, launched in 1923
	HMSAS Oostewal		T08	1939	1944	S Afr Waters: 1939-44	Wrecked some time after 1944 and scrapped in 1954	179 tons, launched in 1926
	HMSAS Stellenberg	MV Southern Cloud	T37 (T477)	1941	1950	S Afr Waters: 1941–45	Purchased by Union of South Africa government after the war. Remained in service until 1950 when sold to Zonkergat Whaling Co. Ltd., Cape Town.	Probably broken up in 1963, as no records exist after this date.
	HMSAS Kommetje	MV Kommetje	T35 (T475)	1 December 1940	2 September 1944	S Afr Waters: 1941–44	Sold to the Union Whaling Company, Durban 22 March 1946 and renamed Uni 8. Sold to McWilliam Iron and Steel Foundry, Durban for scrapping in 1961.	Requisitioned from Kerguelen "Tafelberg" Fleet. Built by Nylands Verksted, Oslo, Norway 1930. Operated in the Antarctic after war services as part of the Union Whaling fleet.
	HMSAS Florida	MV Gun 9 (1930); MV Uni IX (1946)	T34 (T474)	1940	1946	S Afr Waters: 1941–45	Sold to the Union Whaling Co. Ltd (Abraham E. Larsen), Durban, South Africa in 1946 and renamed UNI 9. Operated as a whaling vessel from Durban Bluff until the mid-1950s. Scuttled on 10 May 1975 by the South African Navy, southeast of Durban.	Built in 1930 as a whale catcher Gun 9 by Kaldnes mek. Verksted, Tønsberg for Hvalfanger A/S Africa (Bjarne Gundersen), Sandefjord. In 1933, the vessel was sold to Irvin & Johnson (South Africa) Ltd, Cape Town, and again sold in 1935 to Kerguelen Sealing & Whaling Co. Ltd (Irvin & Johnson (South Africa) Ltd, Cape Town. In 1940, the vessel was requisitioned by the South African Navy and equipped for mine sweeper service, renames HMSAS Florida. After the war, the vessel was sold to the Union Government of South Africa in 1945.
	HMSAS Imhoff	MV Imhoff	T53 (T453)		1948	Libya 1942; Mediterranean 1943–45	Purchased by the Union Government of South Africa, Cape Town, South Africa after the war (1945). Sold to the Union Whaling Co. Ltd (A. E. Larsen) Durban, South Africa in 1948 and renamed MV Egeland. Broken up in 1959.	Converted to LL minesweeper at Hafia. Went into service in the Mediterranean April 1942. Returned to Durban October 1945. 280 t whaler
	HMSAS Grimwood	MV Morote (1923); MV S.H. Grimwood (1931)	T04 (T504)	1940	1947	S Afr Waters: 1940-44	Sold to Premier Whaling Co. Ltd (Abraham E. Larsen), Durban, South Africa in 1947. Fate unknown, was no longer registered in Lloyd's register in 1955.	Built as whale catcher MV Morote by A/S Jarlsø Verft, Tønsberg for Campaña Ballenera Española, Algeciras, Spain. Launched in December 1923. Sold to the Union Whaling Co. Ltd (Abraham E. Larsen), Port Natal, South Africa in 1931 and Renamed MV S. H. Grimwood. Requisitioned by the South African Navy in 1940 and equipped for minesweeper service. Renamed HMSAS Grimwood and in 1945, she was sold to the Union Government of South Africa.
	HMSAS Natalia		T02 (T502)			S Afr Waters: 1940–44; Indian Ocean: 1945	Returned to owner after war. Fate unknown.	Built in 1925 and converted as a minesweeper in 1940. She formed part of a minesweeper flotilla (with HMSAS Bluff, HMSAS Babiana, HMSAS Africana, HMSAS Natalia, HMSAS Aristea and HMSAS Crassula under command of Lt.Cdr. F.J. Dean) to clear German mines off Cape Agulhas on 13–15 May 1940, making them the first South African Navy vessels to participate in operations in WW2. She played an important role in 1942 when attempts were made to rescue the crew and passengers of Dunedan Star which ran aground on the "Skeleton Coast" on the coast of South West Africa (now Namibia). In May 1948, the ship was converted into a trawler in Port Elizabeth harbour.
	HMSAS Larsen		T05			S Afr Waters: 1940-44		
	HMSAS Robinson		T06			S Afr Waters: 1940-44		
	HMSAS Goulding		T03			S Afr Waters: 1940-45		
	HMSAS Whytock	MV Charles Whytock	T07 (T507)	27 June 1940	9 September 1944	S Afr Waters: 1940-44	First sold to Wheelocks, Shanghai 28 June 1946. Sale was cancelled after collapse of the company was re-sold to Knysna Cold Storage & Fisheries Corp in 1948. Registered as MV Knysna.	Built by Nylands MV, Oslo, Norway in 1924. Requisitioned from Premier Whaling Co. Durban, South Africa. Scuttled off Port Elizabeth on 31 March 1952.
	HMSAS Langlaagte	MV Southern Sun (1922); MV Albert Hulett (1936)	T41 (T441)	February 1941	21 January 1946	S Afr Waters: 1940-42; Libya 1942; Mediterranean 1942-45	Sold to LHC Corp on 25 June 1946	Built by Smith's Dock & Co Ltd, Middlesbrough. Requisitioned from the Union Whaling Co. Durban, South Africa on 8 September 1940. Was found unsuitable as an ordinary minesweeper and was converted to a L.L. minesweeper in Cape Town. Sailed from Durban 9 April and went into service in the Mediterranean end May 1942. Returned to Durban in December 1945.
	HMSAS Parktown (T39)	MV Southern Sky (1929); MV Sidney Smith (1936)	T39	February 1941	21 June 1942	S Afr Waters: 1940-44; Libya 1942; Mediterranean 1942	Sunk in action with E Boats off Tobruk.	Built by Smith's Dock & Co Ltd, Middlesbrough. Requisitioned from the Union Whaling Co. Durban, South Africa on 8 September 1940. Was found unsuitable as an ordinary minesweeper and was converted to a L.L. Minesweeper in Cape Town. Sailed from Durban 4 April and went into service in the Mediterranean at the end of May 1942.
	HMSAS Johannesburg	Margarita Molins (1925); Mossa Medes; MV Suderoy III	T56 (T456)	20 August 1942		S Afr Waters: 1942-45	Laid up in March 1946. Handed over to the Royal Navy for disposal on 17 April 1946.	Built by Porsgrund Mek Verksted, Tonsberg, Norway in 1925. Requisitioned from Suderoy Whaling Company on 3 July 1941.
	HMSAS Springs	MV Tas I MV Uni I	T38 (T478)	20 March 1941	20 July 1945	S Afr Waters: 1940-45	Sold by auction back to the Union Whaling Company of Durban 7 May 1946	Built by Moss Værft & Dokk, Moss, Norway for the Fraternitas Whaling Company in 1930. Later bought by the Union Whaling Company of Durban, South Africa. Requisitioned in August 1940.
	HMSAS Nigel	MV Tas II; MV Uni II	T40 (T440)	10 March 1941	11 January 1945	S Afr Waters: 1941-44	Sold by auction to the Palestine Fishing Company of Durban 7 May 1946	Built by Moss Værft & Dokk, Moss, Norway for the Fraternitas Whaling Company in 1930. Later bought by the Union whaling Company of Durban, South Africa. Requisitioned in August 1940.
	HMSAS Germiston	MV Foik (1923); MV Star VI; MV Tas IV; MV Uni IV (1937)	T47	22 September 1941	9 September 1944	S Afr Waters: 1941-44	Sold to private owner 7 May 1946	Built by Akers Shipyards, Oslo, Denmark in 1923. Requisitioned from the Union Whaling Company, Durban, South Africa.
	HMSAS Krugersdorp	MV Alex Lange (1923); MV Star VII; MV Tas V MV Uni V (1937).	T48	21 June 1941	22 August 1944	S Afr Waters: 1941-44	Sold to private owner 7 May 1946	Built by Akers Shipyards, Oslo, Denmark in 1923. Requisitioned from the Union Whaling Company, Durban, South Africa.
Hektor class	HMSAS Roodepoort	MV Hektor 6	T57 (T457)			S Afr Waters: 1942-45		
	HMSAS Boksburg		T46 (T446)			Libya 1942; Mediterranean 1942-5; Aegean 1944		Converted to a LL minesweeper in Durban. Sailed 10 November 1941, and went into service in the Mediterranean at the end of February 1942. Returned to Durban in November 1945. 240 t whaler
Hektor class	HMSAS Bever	MV Hektor 10	T26	10 October 1941	30 November 1944	Libya 1942; Mediterranean 1942-4; Aegean 1944	Struck a mine and sank whilst maneuvering her engines to keep position when in the Gulf of Nauplia, Greece.	Built by Nylands Verksted, Oslo, Norway. Converted to a LL minesweeper in Durban. Sailed 10 Nov 1941 and went into service in the Mediterranean at the end of Feb 1942. 252t Whaler
Hektor class	HMSAS Gribb	MV Hektor 9	T50 (T450)	June 1941	Decommissioned in October 1945 and handed over to the Royal Navy.	Libya 1942; Mediterranean 1943-45; Aegean 1944	Scrapped 1965	Built by Nylands Verksted, Oslo, Norway. Converted to LL minesweeper in Beirut. Went into service in Mediterranean April 1942. Returned to Durban Nov 1945 and sold to M Hosted Fangsrederi of Trondheim, Norway and converted to fishing trawler. 280t Whaler
	HMSAS Seksern	MV Seksern	T52 (T452)	June 1941	April 1946	Libya 1942; Mediterranean 1941-45; Aegean 1944	Returned to owners in April 1946. Sold for scrap by Tromstral in 1974	Built by Akers Men Verksted, Oslo, Norway. Converted to LL minesweeper in Hafia. Went into service in Mediterranean April 1942. Returned to Durban October 1945 and sold to Tromstral & Co, Kristiansand, Norway in 1953 and converted to fishing trawler. 280 t whaler
	HMSAS Treern	MV Treern	T94	June 1941	12 January 1945	Libya 1942; Mediterranean 1942-44; Aegean 1944	Sunk by a mine at Volo, Greece on 12 January 1945.Treern was the last South African warship to be lost during World War II.	Built by Akers Men Verksted, Oslo, Norway. A magnetic minesweeper she is given her number T451 and allocated the pennant number 94. Converted to LL minesweeper in Beirut. Went into service in Mediterranean May 1942. 247 t whaler
	HMSAS Randfontein	MV Pol I	T12 (Note: Previously allocated to Algoa Bay) (T512)	7 October 1941	16 March 1945	S Afr Waters: 1941-44	Returned to RN for disposal 17 April 1946 and sold to Maj. L.H. Cripps on behalf of Wheelock & Co Ltd, Shanghai, China. Sunk off Natal whilst under tow from Durban to China in July 1947	Built by Akers Men Verksted, Oslo, Norway in 1926. Requisitioned from Bryde & Dahl, Norway. Fitted out as conventional minesweeper.
	HMSAS Benoni	Lorentz Bruun; MV Pol V	T54 (T454)	9 March 1942	28 August 1945	S Afr Waters: 1942-45	Returned to RN for disposal 17 April 1946 and sold to Maj. L.H. Cripps on behalf of Wheelock & Co Ltd, Shanghai, China. Also parted from tow in same convoy as Pol V in the Mozambique Channel and was abandoned. Presumed sunk July 1947	First launched Tonsberg, Norway in 1925. Requisitioned from Bryde & Dahl, Norway. Fitted out as a magnetic minesweeper.

=== Minesweeping trawlers ===
Class	Name	Previous names	Pennant	Commissioned	Decommissioned	Battle Honours	Fate	Notes
Mersey class	HMSAS Immortelle (Note: HMSAS Immortelle (HMT Eden), together with HMSAS Sonneblom (HMT Foyle) and HMSAS Protea (1922) (HMS Crozier) were commissioned on 1 April 1922 to form the nucleus of the South African Naval Service (SANS) and were the first three ships in what would become the South African Navy.)	HMT Thomas Johns (1918); HMT Eden (1920)	T49	1 April 1922	31 March 1934		Returned to RN and reverted to HMT Eden.	Builder: Cochrane & Sons, Selby, Yorkshire, England, 1918.
Mersey class	HMSAS Sonneblom (Note: See Note 1)	HMT John Edmund (1918); HMT Foyle (1920)	T48	1 April 1922	31 March 1934	S Afr Waters: 1941-45; Indian Ocean: 1943-45	Returned to RN and reverted to HMT Foyle.	Builder: Goole Shipbuilding and Repair Company, Goole, Hampshire, England, 1918.
Bluff class	HMSAS Aristea	MT Aristea	T18	28 November 1939	27 December 1944	S Afr Waters: 1939-44	Returned to owner December 1944.	Builder: Hall Russell, Aberdeen, 1935. Requisitioned from Irvin & Johnson. She formed part of a minesweeper flotilla (with HMSAS Bluff, HMSAS Babiana, HMSAS Africana, HMSAS Natalia, HMSAS Aristea and HMSAS Crassula under command of Lt.Cdr. F.J. Dean) to clear German mines off Cape Agulhas on 13–15 May 1940, making them the first South African Navy vessels to participate in operations in WW2.
Bluff class	HMSAS Babiana	MT Babiana	T20	23 September 1939	27 December 1944	S Afr Waters: 1939-44	Returned to owner December 1944 and scrapped 1966.	Builder: Hall Russell, Aberdeen, 1934. Requisitioned from Irvin & Johnson. Based in East London She formed part of a minesweeper flotilla (with HMSAS Bluff, HMSAS Babiana, HMSAS Africana, HMSAS Natalia, HMSAS Aristea and HMSAS Crassula under command of Lt.Cdr. F.J. Dean) to clear German mines off Cape Agulhas on 13–15 May 1940, making them the first South African Navy vessels to participate in operations in WW2.
Bluff class	HMSAS Bluff	MT Bluff	T21	15 September 1939	27 December 1944	S Afr Waters: 1939-44	Returned to owner December 1944.	Builder: Hall Russell, Aberdeen, 1934. Requisitioned from Irvin & Johnson.Based in East London. She formed part of a minesweeper flotilla (with HMSAS Bluff, HMSAS Babiana, HMSAS Africana, HMSAS Natalia, HMSAS Aristea and HMSAS Crassula under command of Lt.Cdr. F.J. Dean) to clear German mines off Cape Agulhas on 13–15 May 1940, making them the first South African Navy vessels to participate in operations in WW2.
Bluff class	HMSAS Crassula	MT Crassula	T19	17 October 1939	25 October 1944	S Afr Waters: 1939-44	Returned to owner December 1944 and scrapped 1968.	Builder: Hall Russell, Aberdeen, 1935. Requisitioned from Irvin & Johnson. She formed part of a minesweeper flotilla (with HMSAS Bluff, HMSAS Babiana, HMSAS Africana, HMSAS Natalia, HMSAS Aristea and HMSAS Crassula under command of Lt.Cdr. F.J. Dean) to clear German mines off Cape Agulhas on 13–15 May 1940, making them the first South African Navy vessels to participate in operations in WW2.
Disa class	HMSAS Arum		T10	4 November 1939	26 October 1944	S Afr Waters: 1939-44	Returned to owner	Builder: Hall Russell, Aberdeen, 1926. Requisitioned from Irvin & Johnson.
Disa class	HMSAS Disa		T14	5 September 1939	16 June 1940	S Afr Waters: 1939-40	Returned to owner	Builder: Hall Russell, Aberdeen, 1924. Requisitioned from Irvin & Johnson.
Disa class	HMSAS Nerine		T11	4 November 1939	26 October 1944	S Afr Waters: 1939-44	Returned to owner.	Builder: Hall Russell, Aberdeen, 1925. Requisitioned from Irvin & Johnson.
Castle class	HMSAS Algoa Bay	TR46 (Canadian Navy); MV Algoa Bay	T12	25 November 1939	9 December 1940	S Afr Waters: 1939-40	Returned to owner and resumed trawling	Minesweeping trawler TR 46 was commissioned on 12 May 1919 into Royal Canadian Navy. Was decommissioned the same year and sold to Irvin and Johnson fishing fleet in 1926 and renamed Algoa Bay. Commandeered by South African government in October 1939 and commissioned as minesweeper HMSAS Algoa Bay. She was paid off in December 1940.
Castle class	HMSAS David Haigh	HMCS TR60 (Canadian Navy); CT60 (US Navy); MV David Haigh	D11	19 September 1939	Laid up 15 October 1945	S Afr Waters: 1939-45	Sold on 25 June 1946	TR 60 was complete in Nov 1918 and paid off in 1919. Minesweeping trawler TR 60 was commissioned on 12 May 1919 into Royal Canadian Navy, temporarily transferred to the United States Navy as CT60, she was returned in August 1919. Sold to Irvin and Johnson fishing fleet and requisitioned by South African Navy as HMSAS David Haigh in 1939 and served until 1944. In 1947 she was purchased by Irvin and Johnson as part of the expansion of their South African fishing fleet.
Strath class	HMSAS Richard Bennett		T15			S Afr Waters: 1939-40		
Mersey class	HMSAS Africana		T01 (T501)	10 September 1939	10 April 1947	S Afr Waters: 1939-45	Returned to Sea Fisheries	Built by Hall Russell, Aberdeen Scotland (1930). Requisitioned from South African Department of Sea Fisheries. She formed part of a minesweeper flotilla (with HMSAS Bluff, HMSAS Babiana, HMSAS Africana, HMSAS Natalia, HMSAS Aristea and HMSAS Crassula under command of Lt.Cdr. F.J. Dean) to clear German mines off Cape Agulhas on 13–15 May 1940, making them the first South African Navy vessels to participate in operations in WW2.

=== Minesweepers ===
Class	Name	Previous names	Pennant	Commissioned	Decommissioned	Fate	Notes
Ton class	SAS Durban		M1499			Museum ship in Durban	Built in the UK for South African Navy. While undergoing restoration at the Port Natal Maritime Museum for exhibition as a museum ship, sank at its dock in shallow water on 29 June 2020.
Ton class	SAS East London	HMS Chilton	M1215	October 1958	1989	Sold to an Italian film company in 2003. Broken up after.	Ship was never commissioned in Royal Navy service, was put in storage and later transferred to SA Navy.
Ton class	SAS Johannesburg	HMS Castleton	M1207	June 1959	1985	Broken up 1989	Ship was never commissioned in Royal Navy service, was put in storage and later transferred to SA Navy.
Ton class	SAS Kaapstad	HMS Hazleton	M1141; P1557	22 August 1955	1985	Converted to a patrol minesweeper in the mid-1970s. Broken up 1989	Built by Cooke, Welton & Gemmell, Beverley, Yorks - Laid down on 30 March 1953 and launched on 6 February 1954. Ship was never commissioned in Royal Navy service, was put in storage and sold to SA Navy in 1959. Laid up in December 1985 and broken up in Table Bay in 1989.
Ton class	SAS Kimberley	HMS Stratton	M1210				Ship was never commissioned in Royal Navy service, was put in storage and sold to SA Navy in 1959.
Ton class	SAS Mosselbaai	HMS Oakington	M1213			Broken up 1989	Ship was never commissioned in Royal Navy service, was put in storage and sold to SA Navy in 1959.
Ton class	SAS Port Elizabeth	HMS Dumbleton	M1212	October 1958		Broken up 1989	Ship was never commissioned in Royal Navy service, was put in storage and sold to SA Navy in 1959.
Ton class	SAS Pretoria	HMS Dunkerton; HMS Golden Firefly	M1144; P1556	22 August 1955	December 1985	Converted to a patrol ninesweeper in the mid-1970s. Broken up in Cape Town, December 2010	Built by Goole Shipbuilding & Repair Co Ltd, Goole. Ship was never commissioned into Royal Navy service, was put in storage and sold to SA Navy in 1959. After decommissioning, became a museum ship in Hout Bay - Laid down: 25 September 1952 and launched: 8 March 1954 (SANF). Sold to Charles Bates in December 1987 and laid up as a static museum ship in Hout Bay until late 1990s. Sold to Gary van der Merwe and converted to a yacht and renamed 'Madiba' then converted to diving support vessel and chartered to De Beers as survey vessel off the Namibian coast. Name changed to Golden Firefly. Broken up in Cape Town, December 2010.
Ton class	SAS Walvisbaai	HMS Packington	M1214	1959		Sold to The Walt Disney Company	Ship was never commissioned in Royal Navy service, was put in storage and sold to SA Navy in 1959.
Ton class	SAS Windhoek		M1498	17 April 1958	1999	Sold and broken up for scrap in 2003	Built in the UK for South African Navy by John I. Thornycroft & Co, Ltd, Woolston, Southampton. Laid down 5 July 1956 and launched 27 June 1957.
Algerine class	SAS Pietermaritzburg	HMS Pelorus (J-291)	M291		7 October 1943 in RN	Scuttled in Smitswinkel Bay; 12 November 1994	Built by Lobnitz, Renfrew, Scotland. Laid down on 8 October 1942 and launched 18 June 1943. Sold to the South African Navy in 1947 - Arrived in South Africa 24 December 1947. Scuttled as an artificial reef at Miller's Point near Simon's Town 12 November 1994.
Algerine class	HMSAS Bloemfontein	HMS Rosamund	M439	16 July 1945		Expended as target on 5 June 1967 in False Bay	Built by Port Arthur Shipbuilding, Canada. Laid down 26 April 1944 and launched 20 December 1944. Sold to the South African Navy in 1947, arrived in South Africa: 24 December 1947. Sunk as a target in False Bay 5 June 1967.

== Submarines ==
Class	Name	Previous names	Pennant	Commissioned	Decommissioned	Fate	Notes
Daphne class	SAS Spear	SAS Maria van Riebeeck	S97	24 Jul 1970 '	2003	Scrapped	Originally named for the wife of Jan van Riebeeck (first Cape Colony commander) Maria van Riebeeck
Daphne class	SAS Umkhonto	SAS Emily Hobhouse	S98	26 Feb 1971	2008	Scrapped	Named for Emily Hobhouse
Daphne class	SAS Assegaai	SAS Johanna van der Merwe	S99	27 Aug 1971		Simonstown Naval Museum	Named for Voortrekker heroine Johanna van der Merwe
Agosta class	SAS Adventurous			Never commissioned		Not delivered; sold to Pakistan as PNS Hurmat	Built by Dubigeon-Normandie Nantes, France. Launched 1 December 1978 and completed 18 February 1980. These vessels were ordered from France, but were embargoed (United Nations Security Council Resolution 418 in 1977) on 8 November 1977 with South African crews on board.
Agosta class	SAS Astrant			Never commissioned		Not delivered; sold to Pakistan as PNS Hashmat	Built by Dubigeon-Normandie Nantes, France. Launched 14 December 1977 and completed 17 February 1979. These vessels were ordered from France, but were embargoed (United Nations Security Council Resolution 418 in 1977) on 8 November 1977 with South African crews on board.

Ships related to above classes
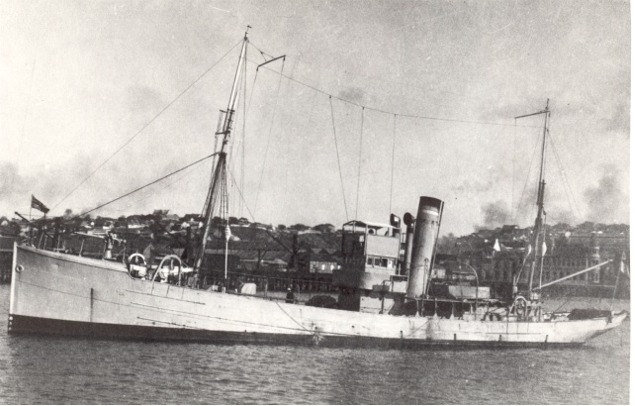
HMSAS Immortelle, circa 1935

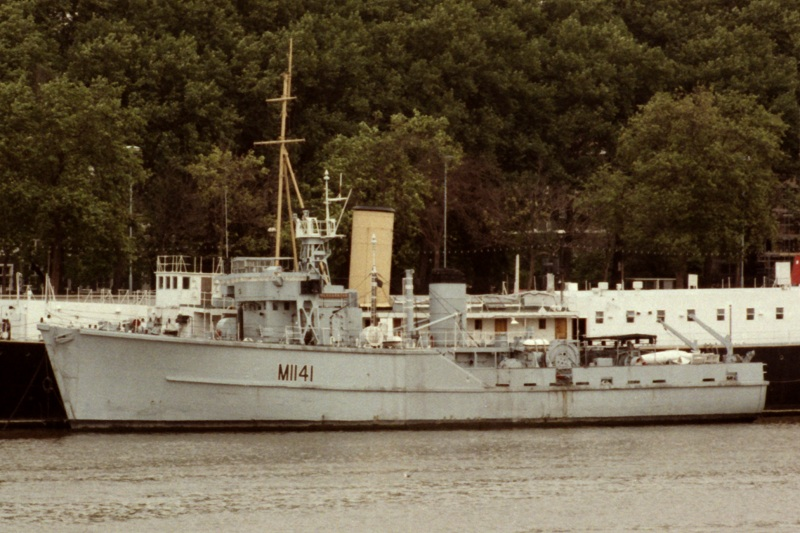
Ton-class minesweeper

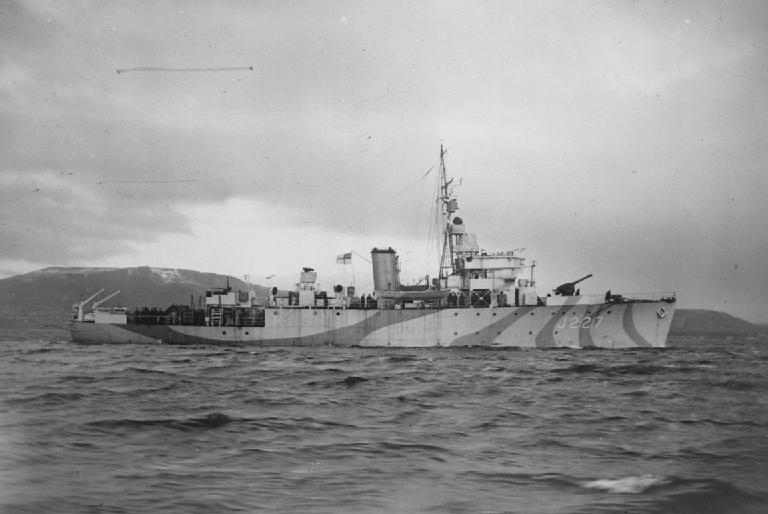
Algerine-class minesweeper

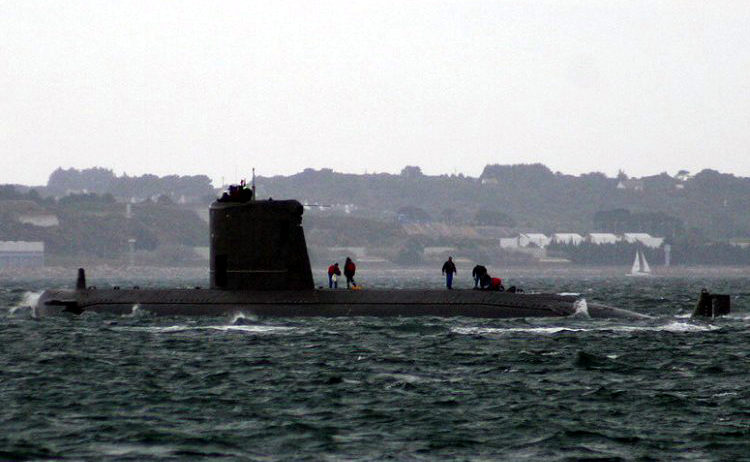
Agosta-class submarine. Ordered by the South African Navy but never delivered due to arms embargo.

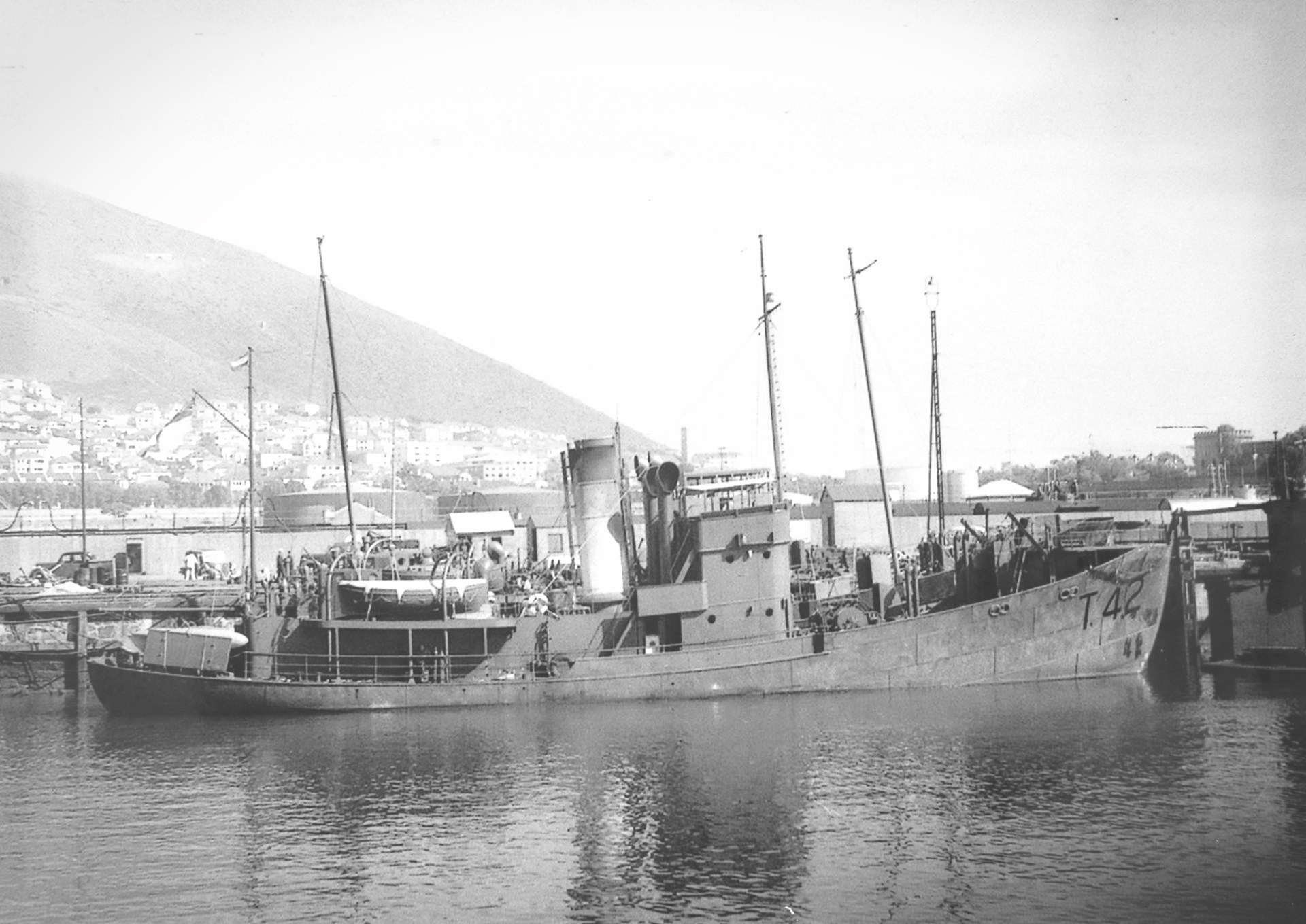
HMSAS Brakpan, circa 1941

== Anti-submarine ==
=== Anti-submarine whalers and trawlers ===
South African Navy vessels pennant numbers T01-T62 used numbers duplicated with the Royal Navy. In 1944, South African Navy vessel pennant numbers were increased to avoid duplication. 500 was added to pennant numbers T01-21, 440 was added to pennant numbers T22-39 and 400 was added to numbers T40-61. Thus as an example, T40 became T440 and T05 became T505.

Class	Name	Previous names	Pennant	Commissioned	Decommissioned	Battle Honours	Fate	Notes
AS Whaler	HMSAS Blaauwberg		T32	27 December 1940		S Afr Waters: 1941-45; Indian Ocean: 1944-45		
AS Whaler	HMSAS Cedarberg		T31	14 March 1941		S Afr Waters 1940-45; Indian Ocean: 1944		
AS Whaler	HMSAS Sydostlandet	MV Sydostlandet	T33	4 January 1941	6 April 1942	S Afr Waters: 1941-42	Ran aground (and sank) on 6 April 1942 in bad weather approx. 4.5 nm north of the Umgeni River mouth at Durban, South Africa.	1932 - Built as at Framnæs mechanical Workshop, Sandefjord, Norway for A/S Thor Dahl, Sandefjord; named MV Sydostlandet. Sold to Irvin & Johnsen (South Africa) Ltd, Cape Town in June 1933 and transferred to Kerguelen Sealing & Whaling Co. Ltd, Cape Town. in 1934. Requisitioned by S. A. Navy, Cape Town in 1941 and renamed HMSAS Sydtostlanet T. 33 and Converted to mine sweeper.
AS Whaler	HMSAS Odberg	MV Odberg	T25 (T465)	1 May 1941		S Afr Waters: 1941-45; Indian Ocean: 1943-45	1946: Sold to Anders Jahre & Co, Sandefjord and registered as MV Kos 30	First registered on 22.1.1936 to Kerguelen Sealing & Whaling Co Ltd, (Irvin & Johnson (South Africa) Ltd), Cape Town.
AS Trawler	HMSAS Rondevlei	MV Hektor 1	T14	8 June 1940		S Afr Waters: 1942-45		Assigned as S.A.N.F. vessel in South African waters. 247t whaler.
AS Whaler	HMSAS Smalvlei	MV Hektor 2	T15 (T515)	8 June 1940		S Afr Waters: 1940-45	Taken over by The Union Whaling Co.Ltd., Durban after the war, registered as MV UNI XI.	Requisitioned for Naval use from June 1940 to May 1946 from Hektoria Ltd, Cape Town.
AS Whaler	HMSAS Tordonn	MV Tordonn	T58 (T458)	25 November 1941	3 October 1945	S Afr Waters: 1942-45	Returned to original owners Thor Dahl but was sold by them to W. Harold Lauritzen, Sortland, Norway in 1949. Converted to a tug named Varangis. Sold on again 1968 as Eidsvaering. Sold again 1975 to Harald Kjerringveg. Still registered as at 1992.	Built by Smith's Dock Co. Ltd, Middlesbrough in 1925.
AS Whaler	HMSAS Pretoria		T59 (T459)	8 May 1942		S Afr Waters: 1942-45; Indian Ocean: 1942-45		
AS Whaler	HMSAS Turffontein		T61 (T461)	17 August 1942		S Afr Waters: 1942-45; Indian Ocean: 1943-45		
AS Whaler	HMSAS Vereeniging		T62	27 June 1942		S Afr Waters: 1942-45; Indian Ocean: 1943-45		
AS Whaler	HMSAS Standerton		T60 (T460)	26 October 1942		S Afr Waters: 1941-45; Indian Ocean: 1943-45		
Southern class	HMSAS Southern Floe	MV Southern Floe	T26	October 1940	11 February 1941	Mediterranean 1941	Lost off Tobruk by sea mine (Note: Losses were: ANDERS, John, Steward, 69637 (SANF), MPK BOWER, Robert, Stoker 1c, 69935 (SANF), MPK BRAND, Leslie A, Able Seaman, 69828 (SANF), MPK CAULFIELD, Patrick, Steward, 69802 (SANF), MPK CHANDLER, Charles R D, Cook (S), 69613 (SANF), MPK CHENOWETH, Richard, Stoker 1c, 67420 (SANF), MPK FAIRLEY, Alexander E, Sub Lieutenant SANF, MPK FRIEDLANDER, Cecil A, Able Seaman, 114703 (SANF), MPK GARDINER, Elliott, Able Seaman, 67260 (SANF), MPK GREENACRE, John H, Leading Seaman, 69677 (SANF), MPK HEASMAN, Gratwicke E E, Engine Room Artificer 4c, 69784 (SANF), MPK HOGG, Roy S, Sub Lieutenant, SANF, MPK INNES, Ian Mck, Sub Lieutenant, SANF, MPK MARSH, Reginald H Y, Able Seaman, 69911 (SANF), MPK MITCHELL, William N, Able Seaman, 69787 (SANF), MPK NEL, Eloff R, Able Seaman, 69635 (SANF), MPK NICHOLSON, Douglas O, Able Seaman, 66833 (SANF), MPK PUGH, John R, Able Seaman, 66877 (SANF), MPK RYALL, David R, Able Seaman, 69999 (SANF), MPK SHIMMIN, William, Leading Stoker, 69661 (SANF), MPK SIENI, Joseph F, Able Seaman, 69788 (SANF), MPK SNELL, Harold W, Leading Telegraphist, 69827 (SANF), MPK STANLEY, Gordon J, Able Seaman, 66963 (SANF), MPK WALTON, Dudley N, Sub Lieutenant, SANF, MPK)	Requisitioned from the Southern Whaling & Sealing Co. Ltd., Durban. 344 tons, converted for Anti-Submarine operations and armed with 1x 3 lb Gun (forward), 20mm and machine-guns. Complement of 20-25 Officers and ratings. Formed part of 22nd Anti-Submarine Group, S.A. Seaward Defence Force, Mediterranean. Assigned to Royal Navy with South African crew. Mediterranean 22nd Anti-submarine group. Sailed from Durban 15 Dec 1940 and went into service in Mediterranean Jan 1941. 344 t whaler.
Southern class	HMSAS Southern Maid	MV Southern Maid	T27 (T467)	October 1940		Libya 1941-42; Mediterranean 1941-45; Sicily 1943		Requisitioned from the Southern Whaling & Sealing Co. Ltd., Durban. 344 tons, converted for Anti-Submarine operations and armed with 1x 3 lb Gun (forward), 20mm and machine-guns. Complement of 20-25 Officers and ratings. Assigned to Royal Navy with South African crew. Mediterranean 22nd Anti-submarine group. Sailed from Durban 15 Dec 1940 and went into service in Mediterranean Jan 1941. Returned to Durban Dec 1945. 344 t whaler.
Southern class	HMSAS Southern Barrier (Note: Named HMSAS Southern Barrier from 1939 to September 1941); HMSAS Steenberg (Note: Named HMSAS Steenberg from January 1945 to May 1946. Retained pennant number T.28)	MV Southern Barrier	T28			S Afr Waters: 1940-45	Sold to A / S Kosmos (Anders Jahre & Co.), Sandefjord in May 1946 and renames MV Kos 29 and was sold for scrap in 1964.	Delivered from Bremer Volcano, Vegesack to Southern Whaling & Sealing Co. Ltd., London in 1939 as MV Southern Barrier and was requisitioned by South African Seaward Defense Force as HMSAS Southern Barrier T. 28 in 1940. In September 1941 vessel was sold to Chr. Salvesen & Co who retained the name until January 1945 when vessel was in-turn sold to Union Government of South Africa as a minesweeper and named HMSAS Steenberg T.28.
Southern class	HMSAS Southern Isles	MV Southern Isles	T29	November 1940		S Afr Waters: 1945; Indian Ocean: 1945; Libya 1941-42; Mediterranean 1941-44		Assigned to Royal Navy with South African crew. Requisitioned from the Southern Whaling & Sealing Co. Ltd., Durban. 344 tons, converted for Anti-Submarine operations and armed with 1x 3 lb Gun (forward), 20mm and machine-guns. Complement of 20-25 Officers and ratings. Mediterranean 22nd Anti-submarine group. Sailed from Durban 15 Dec 1940 and went into service in Mediterranean Jan 1941. Returned to Durban Dec 1944. 344 t whaler.
Southern class	HMSAS Southern Sea	MV Southern Sea	T30 (T470)	November 1940		S Afr Waters: 1945; Indian Ocean: 1945; Libya 1941-42; Mediterranean 1941-44		Assigned to Royal Navy with South African crew. Requisitioned from the Southern Whaling & Sealing Co. Ltd., Durban. 344 tons, converted for Anti-Submarine operations and armed with 1x 3 lb Gun (forward), 20mm and machine-guns. Complement of 20-25 Officers and ratings. Mediterranean 22nd Anti-submarine group. Sailed from Durban 15 Dec 1940 and went into service in Mediterranean Jan 1941. Returned to Durban Dec 1944. 344 t whaler.
Terje class	HMSAS Brakpan		T42			S Afr Waters: 1941-45	Brakpan may have been sunk by a mine off the coast of Greece.	Built in Wesermund, Germany in 1936
Terje class	HMSAS Protea (T43)		T43 (T443)			S Afr Waters: 1942-43; Indian Ocean: 1944-45; Libya 1941-42; Aegean 1944; Mediterranean 1941-45; Sicily 1943		Assigned to Royal Navy with South African crew. Mediterranean 22nd Anti-submarine group. Sailed from Durban 9 Aug 1941 and went into service in Mediterranean Oct 1941 to replace Southern Floe. Returned to Durban Dec 1945. 335 t whaler.
Terje class	HMSAS Sonneblom (T44)	MV Terje 8	T44 (T444)	14 August 1941				
Terje class	HMSAS Immortelle (T45)		T45 (T445)	5 November 1941		S Afr Waters: 1942-44; Indian Ocean: 1944-45		
AS Trawler	HMSAS Blomvlei		T17 (T517)	11 October 1939		S Afr Waters: 1940-44		Assigned as S.A.N.F. vessel in South African waters. Deployed as minesweeper until Feb 1940 and converted to Anti-submarine trawler April 1940. 252 t whaler.
AS Trawler	HMSAS Mooivlei		T16 (T516)	13 November 1939		S Afr Waters: 1940-45		Assigned as S.A.N.F. vessel in South African waters. Deployed as minesweeper until Feb 1940 and converted to Anti-submarine trawler April 1940. 252 t whaler.

=== Frigates ===
Class	Name	Previous names	Pennant	Commissioned	Decommissioned	Battle Honours	Fate	Notes
River class	HMSAS Teviot	HMS Teviot	K222	June 1945	January 1946	Indian Ocean: 1945	Returned to Royal Navy in 1946.	Built by Hall Russell, Aberdeen, Scotland. Sold on 29 March 1955 and broken up for scrap.
River class	HMSAS Swale	HMS Swale	K217	1 August 1945	March 1946	Indian Ocean: 1945	Returned to Royal Navy in 1946.	Built by Smith's Dock, Middlesbrough and launched in 1942. Sold on 26 February 1955 for scrap.
Loch class	SAS Good Hope	HMS Loch Boisdale (K432)	F432	5 July 1944.	October 1965	North Atlantic 1944-45; North Sea 1944; English Channel 1945	Scuttled in Smitswinkel Bay, 12 December 1978.	Built by Blythe D.D. & Co
Loch class	SAS Natal	HMS Loch Cree (K430)	F430 later A301	19 June 1944		North Sea 1944	Sunk as a target off the Cape, 19 September 1972.	Built by Swan Hunter. Used as a survey ship from 1957.
Loch class	SAS Transvaal	HMS Loch Ard K602	F602	2 August 1944			Scuttled in Smitswinkel Bay 3, August 1978.	Built by Harland & Wolf.
Type 15 A/S	SAS Vrystaat	HMS Wrangler (R48)	F157	29 November 1956	1963		Paid off into reserve.	Sunk as submarine target 14 April 1976.
President class (Note: The President class were three Rothesay-class frigates provided under the British-South African Simonstown Agreement)	SAS President Pretorius		F145	18 March 1964	1985		Sold for scrap 1990.	Named for the first President of the South African Republic Marthinus Wessel Pretorius
President class	SAS President Kruger		F150	3 October 1962	Sunk 1982		Sunk after a collision with SAS Tafelberg on 18 February 1982.	Named for South African Republic President Paul Kruger.
President class	SAS President Steyn		F147	8 April 1963	1980		Used as a target and sunk by missile on 29 April 1991.	Named for the last State President of the Orange Free State, Martinus Theunis Steyn

=== Destroyers ===
Class	Name	Previous names	Pennant	Commissioned	Decommissioned	Fate	Notes
W class	SAS Jan van Riebeeck	HMS Wessex	D278	1950	1975	Continued in service until 1978 when she was put on the Disposal List. Expended as a missile target on 25 March 1980.	Wessex transferred to South African Navy 29 March 1950 and renamed Jan van Riebeeck after the Dutch founder of Cape Town Jan van Riebeeck. She was modernised with a partial conversion into a frigate between 1964 and 1966.
W class	SAS Simon van der Stel	HMS Whelp	D237	1952	27 March 1972	Placed in reserve from 1957, but was modernised as a Type 15 frigate (in common with other destroyers of her generation) from 1962 to 1964, and re-commissioned in February 1964. Simon van der Stel was scrapped in 1976 at Durban.	Sold to South Africa as the replacement for HMSAS Natal (formerly HMS Loch Cree) in 1952. Renamed Simon van der Stel, after the 17th century colonist reputed to be the founder of the South African wine industry. Much of Simon van der Stel′s service was as a "grey ambassador", on good-will visits to Europe and Europe's African colonies, including a 147-day cruise to Europe in 1954. This role, however, declined as South Africa became increasingly isolated during the apartheid years.

=== Corvettes ===
Ordered from France in 1976, but the sale was blocked in 1977 by United Nations Security Council Resolution 418 after official naming, but before they could be delivered or commissioned.

Class	Name	Previous names	Pennant	Commissioned	Decommissioned	Fate	Notes
A69 class	SAS Good Hope		F432	Never commissioned into SA Navy		Sold to Argentina by builders as ARA Drummond.	Vessel was ordered from France, commissioned and South African crew were aboard receiving training when the sale was blocked in 1977.
A69 class	SAS Transvaal		F602	Never commissioned into SA Navy		Sold to Argentina by builders as ARA Guerrico	Vessel was ordered from France, named and crew trained in France. Delivery cancelled due to the arms embargo.

Ships related to above classes
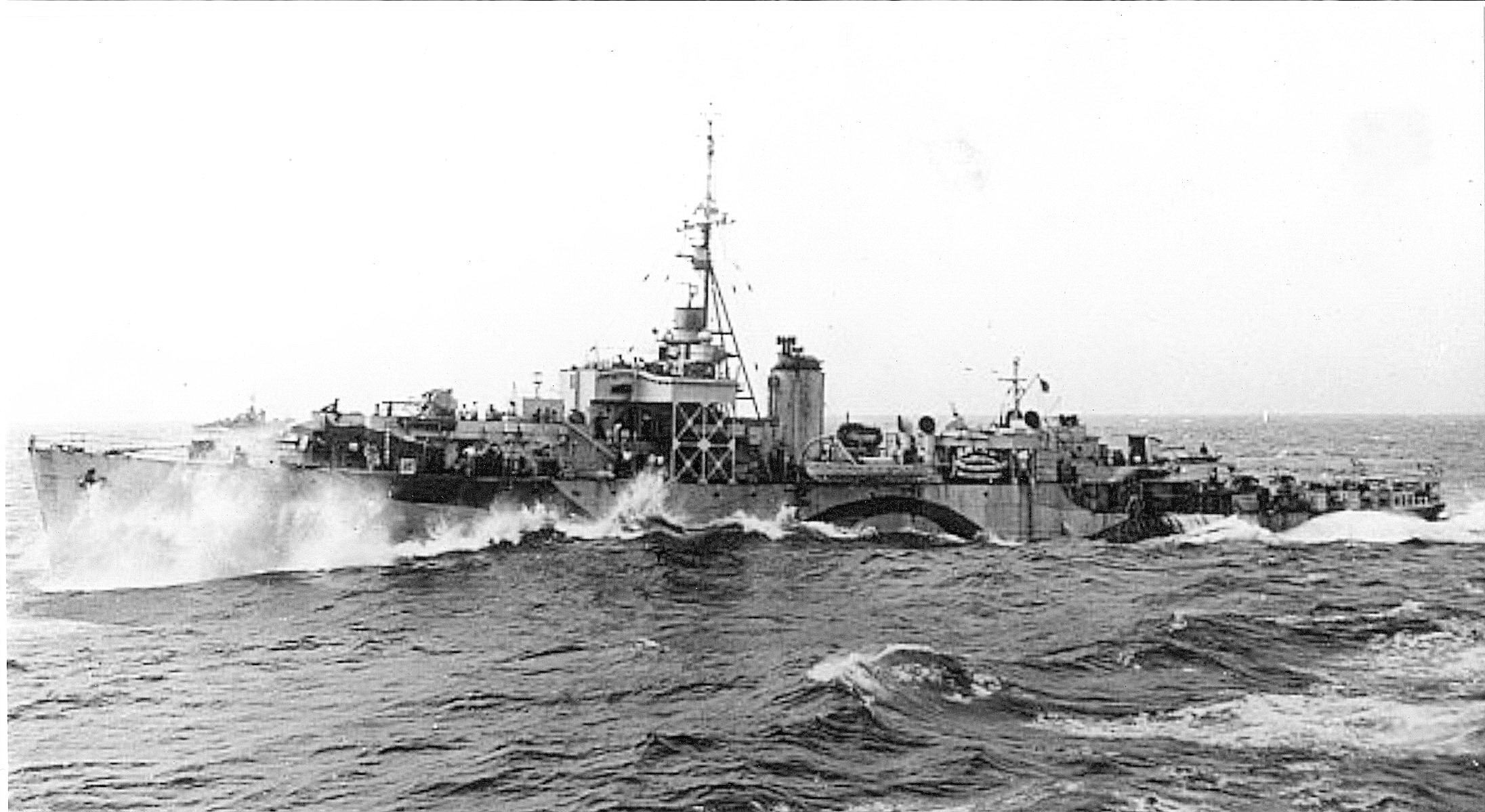
HMS Swale was loaned to South Africa for six months

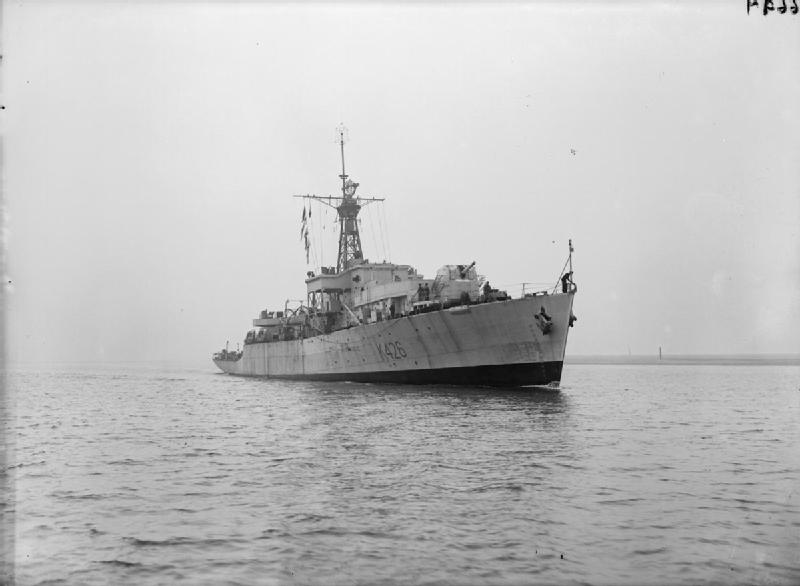
Loch-class frigate

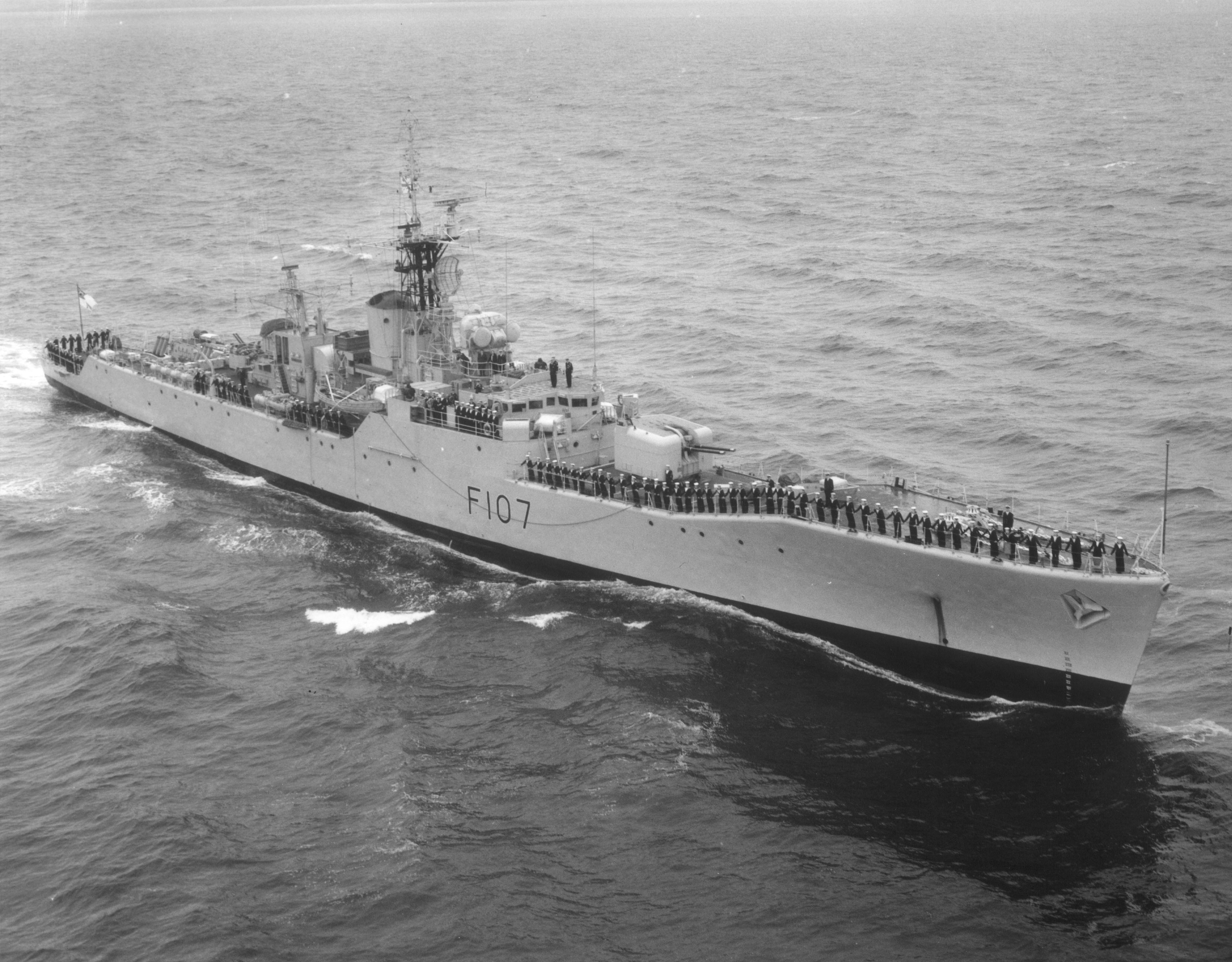
Two of the President-class frigates were built at the same yard as their sister HMS Rothesay

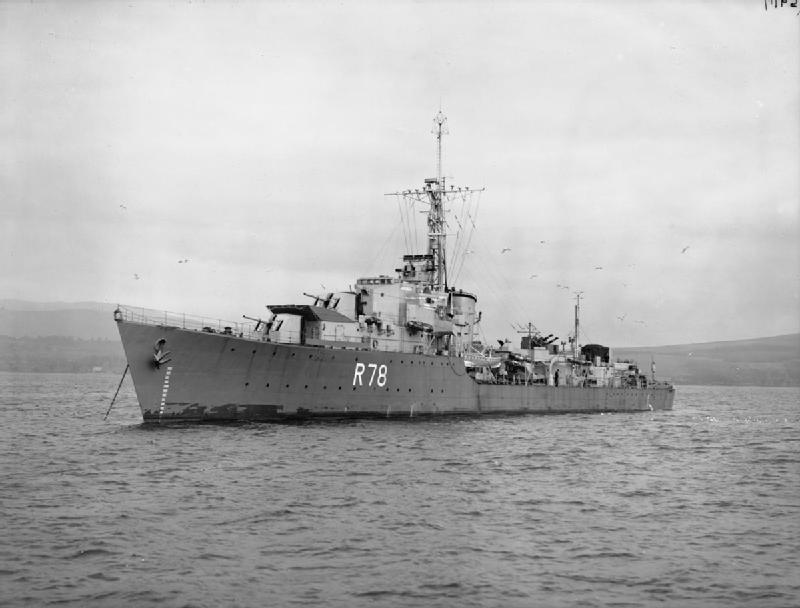
SAS Jan van Riebeeck pictured when still named HMS Wessex

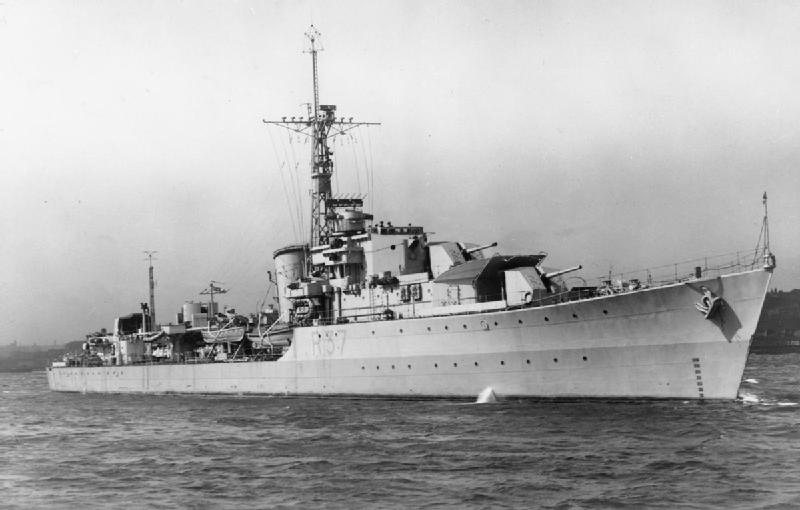
HMSAS Simon van der Stel (Photo when still named HMS Whelp underway on the Tyne, 1944)

== Fast attack craft ==
=== Strike craft ===
Class	Name	Previous names	Pennant	Commissioned	Decommissioned	Fate	Notes
Warrior class (Note: Previously Minister class)	SAS Jan Smuts		P1561	8 July 1977	2004	Scrapped 2004	Built by Israel Shipyards Ltd, Haifa, Israel. Originally named after PM of Union of South Africa Jan Smuts
Warrior class	SAS Shaka	SAS P.W. Botha	P1562	2 December 1977	2005	Sunk as target 22 April 2005 by MM40 Exocet anti-ship missile fired by frigate SAS Amatola.	Built by Israel Shipyards Ltd, Haifa, Israel. Originally named for former President of South Africa Pieter Willem Botha
Warrior class	SAS Adam Kok	SAS Frederic Creswell	P1563	6 April 1978		Awaiting disposal	Built by Israel Shipyards Ltd, Haifa, Israel. Originally named for South African Labour Party minister Frederic Creswell and renamed for black South African leader Adam Kok III
Warrior class	SAS Sekhukhuni	SAS Jim Fouché	P1564	22 December 1978	2005	Sunk as target 2005	Built by Sandock Austral, Durban, South Africa. Originally named after 2nd President of South Africa Jacobus Johannes Fouché
Warrior class	SAS Isaac Dyobha	SAS Frans Erasmus	P1565	16 Mar 1979	2022		Named for former National Party cabinet minister Frans Erasmus; renamed after the Reverend Isaac Dyobha, a chaplain in the SA Native Labour Corps who died in the sinking of the SS Mendi in 1917. Built by Sandock-Austral, Durban, South Africa. Previously decommissioned, was refurbished by SA Shipyards and recommissioned as Offshore Patrol Vessel (OPV) between 2012 and 2014.
Warrior class	SAS René Sethren	SAS Oswald Pirow	P1566	4 March 1980	October 2001	Awaiting disposal	Built by Sandock Austral, Durban, South Africa. Originally named after National Party minister Oswald Pirow and renamed for decorated HMSAS officer René Sethren CGM
Warrior class	SAS Job Masego	SAS Kobie Coetsee	P1568	11 February 1983	2008	Sold for scrap	Built by Sandock Austral, Durban, South Africa. Originally named after National Party politician Kobie Coetsee; renamed after Cpl Job Masego of the Native Military Corps
Warrior class	SAS Galeshewe	SAS Hendrik Mentz	P1567	11 February 1983	2020	Reserve	Built by Sandock Austral, Durban, South Africa. Originally named afterSouth African Party minister of defence Hendrik Mentz. Between 2012 and 2014, selected to be modified to perform duties as an Offshore Patrol Vessel. Conducted regular anti-piracy operations in the Mozambique Channel.

== Defence vessels ==
=== Boom defence vessels ===
Boom defence vessels were used to maintain anti-submarine nets and anti-torpedo nets around ports, anchorages and individual ships. Royal Navy Bar class.

Class	Name	Previous names	Pennant	Commissioned	Decommissioned	Battle Honours	Fate	Notes
Bar class	SAS Somerset	HMS Barcross, (P285) retained the name HMSAS Barcross until 1951. Renamed SAS Somerset 1951	P285	Transferred to S A Navy on 21 January 1943	31 March 1986	S Afr Waters: 1943-45	Used as a museum ship, Victoria & Alfred Waterfront from 2 September 1988. Scrapped 2024.	Built by Blythe S.B. Co (1942).
Bar class	SAS Fleur	HMS Barbrake (Z173) retained the name HMSAS Barbrake until 1951. Renamed HMSAS Fleur 1951 and SAS Fleur in 1952.	P273	Transferred to S A Navy on 15 February 1943		S Afr Waters: 1943-44; Indian Ocean: 1943-44	Sunk by naval gunfire near Simonstown on 8 October 1965	Built by William Simons & Co, Renfrew, Scotland (1942)

=== Seaward defence boats ===
Class	Name	Previous names	Pennant	Commissioned	Decommissioned	Fate	Notes
Ford class	SAS Gelderland	HMS Brayford; HMSAS Gelderland	P3105	30 August 1954	1988	Stripped and expended as a demolition target off Duiker Point. 21 December 1988	Built by A&J Ingles Ltd, Glasgow. Laid down 1951 and launched 19 February 1952. Transferred to SA Navy 1954.
Ford class	SAS Nautilus	HMS Glassford; HMSAS Nautilus	P3120	23 August 1955	17 October 1985	Laid up in Simon's Town. Sold by public tender in 1989 and converted to yacht Nautilus in Cape Town.	Built by Richard Dunston Ltd, Doncaster. Laid down 1952 and launched 28 March 1955. Transferred to SA Navy 1955.
Ford class	SAS Rijger	HMSAS Rijger	P3125	6 October 1958		Paid off at Simon's Town. Converted into a re-usable missile target barge. Approved for disposal 1992	Built for South African Navy by Vosper Ltd, Portsmouth. Laid down 1956 and launched 6 February 1958.
Ford class	SAS Haerlem	HMSAS Haerlem	P3126	2 June 1959	1987	Scuttled off Humewood Beach, Port Elizabeth as artificial reef on 30 November 1987.	Built for South African Navy by Vosper Ltd, Portsmouth. Laid down 1957, launched 18 June 1958 and completed on 28 November 1958.
Ford class	SAS Oosterland	HMSAS Oosterland	P3127	8 September 1959		Paid off at Durban. Converted into a re-usable missile target barge. Sold to private owner in Hout Bay in 1990.	Built for South African Navy by Vosper Ltd, Portsmouth. Laid down 1958, launched 27 January 1959 and completed on 8 September 1959.

=== Harbour defence motor launches ===
HDML 1100-1200 Series were South African built harbour defence motor launches. Length of 72 ft propelled by 2x Gardiner 8-cylinder diesel engines providing 130 BHP with cruising speed of 11 kn.

Class	Name	Previous names	Pennant	Commissioned	Decommissioned	Battle Honours	Fate	Notes
HDML 1100-1300 Series	HDML 1197		HDML1197	24 July 1943	1966	S Afr Waters: 1943-45	Sold 1966	Built by Fred Nicolls, Durban. Attached to SAS Unitie and later SAS Saldanha. Renamed Windward II after sale.
HDML 1100-1300 Series	HDML 1198		HDML1198	26 July 1943	1956	S Afr Waters: 1943-45	Sold	Built by Fred Nicolls, Durban. Attached to Salisbury Island.
HDML 1100-1300 Series	HDML 1199		HDML1199	20 July 1943		S Afr Waters: 1943-45	Sold 1955	Built by Fred Nicolls, Durban. Attached to SAS Inkonkoni until 1948. Used as a ferry on Salisbury Island from 1948 - 1950.
HDML 1100-1300 Series	HDML 1200		HDML1200	4 August 1943	8 September 1969	S Afr Waters: 1943-45	Sold	Built by Fred Nicolls, Durban. Attached to SAS Donkin. Renamed Venture. after sale to private owner.
HDML 1100-1300 Series	HDML 1201		HDML1201	6 August 1943	1959	S Afr Waters: 1943-45	Sold	Built by Fred Nicolls, Durban. Attached to Naval Dockyard, Simon's Town.
HDML 1100-1300 Series	HDML 1202		HDML1202	3 September 1943	1962	S Afr Waters: 1943-45	Sold 1962	Built by Fred Nicolls, Durban. Attached to SAS Port Rex and later SAS Donkin. Damaged in collision in 1959.
HDML 1100-1300 Series	HDML 1203		HDML1203	22 July 1943	1968	S Afr Waters: 1943-45	Sold 1968	Built by Herbie Spradbrow, Durban. Attached to SAS Port Rex and later transferred to SAS Inkonkoni.
HDML 1100-1300 Series	HDML 1204		HDML1204	10 December 1943	1976	S Afr Waters: 1943-45	Sold 1976	Built by Herbie Spradbrow, Durban. Attached to SAS Robbeneiland. Used as ferry between Cape Town and Murry's Harbour on Robben Island. Transferred to Military Academy, Saldanha in 1971.
HDML 1100-1300 Series	HDML 1330		HDML1330	23 June 1944	1953	S Afr Waters: 1944-45	Sold for scrap 1953	Built by Fred Nicolls, Durban.
HDML 1100-1300 Series	HDML 1331		HDML1331	28 June 1944	1952	S Afr Waters: 1943-45	Sold 1953	Built by Fred Nicolls, Durban. Attached to Salisbury Island.
HDML 1100-1300 Series	HDML 1332		HDML1332	28 June 1944	1958	S Afr Waters: 1943-45	Sold 1958	Built by Fred Nicolls, Durban. Attached to SAS Unitie.

== Depot / replenishment ships ==
Class	Name	Previous names	Pennant	Commissioned	Decommissioned	Fate	Notes
Gadfly class	HMSAS Afrikander	HMS Tickler (1879); HMS YC229 (1902)		15 June 1923	December 1932	Returned to Royal Navy	Builder: Pembroke Dock, England, 1879. Tickler was a third-class coastal defence gunboat, converted to the role of a depot ship in 1919. Renamed HMS Afrikander II in 1933. Broken up for scrap, Simons Town 1937.
Commercial tanker	SAS Tafelberg	Danish MT Annam	A243	10 August 1967		Sold for scrap 1993	Built by Nakskovs Skibsvaerft, Denmark and completed on 23 October 1958.
Icebreaker	SAS Outeniqua	Aleksandr Sledzyuk; Juvent	A302	8 June 1993	30 July 2004	Sold for conversion to floating accommodation vessel on the River Tyne, UK.	Built by Khersonski Sudnobudivny in Zavod-Kherson, Ukraine, launched 6 September 1991 as Alexander Sledzuk. After 12 months charter service renamed as Juvent. Purchased on behalf of the SA Navy on February 26, 1993, as replacement for SAS Tafelberg. In 1994 modifications to hangar, flight deck, replenishment at sea equipment and the fitting of light armament were done to permit conversion to combat support vessel. Sold to Mertech Marine (Pty) Ltd and renamed Paardeburg. Sold again in 2006 to C&M Gp. and became Ice Maiden I in 2007.

== Other vessels ==
=== Air-sea rescue launches ===
Class	Name	Previous names	Pennant	Commissioned	Decommissioned	Fate	Notes
Type 1 HSL	R0	HMS Malmok	R0	1940	1946	Sold after having her engines removed.	Built by British Power Boat Company, Hythe, Southampton.
63-foot crash boat	R1 to R8		R1 to R8	1941		R1, 3, 5, 6, 7 and 8 sold 1946–8. R2 sold in 1950s. R4 sold in 1960s.	Built by Miami Shipbuilding Corporation, Florida, USA.
63-foot crash boat	R10 to R20		R10 to R20	1944		R10 broken up in 1946 after grounding. R12, 14, 15, 16 and 17 sold in 1950s. R11, 18, 19 and 20 sold in the 1960s.	Built by Miami Shipbuilding Corporation, Florida, USA.
	P1551	R31	P1551	1962			Built by Kogerwerft, Redsburg, West Germany.
	P1552	R30	P1552	1961	1988	Lost off Saldanah Bay on 7 October 1988 after striking a reef off Danger Point.	Built by Kogerwerft, Redsburg, West Germany.
PT boat	P1553	R9	P1553	1944	1973	Sold to private owner. Renamed Circe, Hout Bay.	Built by Miami Shipbuilding Corporation, Florida, USA.
Tracker-class	P1554		P1554	1973	1986	Sold to private owner.	Built by Groves & Gutteridge, Cowes, UK.
Tracker-class	P1555		P1555	1973			Built by Groves & Gutteridge, Cowes, UK.
	P1558		P1558	1977	1986	Sunk as a gunnery target on 15 September 1988 during Exercise Magersfontein.	Built by Dorman Long Van der Bijl Corporation, Durban South Africa in 1976. Built for the Malawian Defence Force for use on Lake Malawi. With the revolution in Mozambique in 1977, the planned delivery route via northern Mozambique was no longer viable. The ship was subsequently handed over to the South African Navy.

=== Hospital ships ===
Class	Name	Previous names	Pennant	Commissioned	Decommissioned	Fate	Notes
	HMHS Ebani	SS Ebani		1 December 1914	1918	Transferred to Royal Navy after World War I. Sold in 1938 to Italy and renamed Maristella.	Manned by Natal Medical Corps (NMC) and complemented by British crew. Served as hospital ship for service in German South-West Africa.

=== Hydrographic survey vessels ===
Class	Name	Previous names	Pennant	Commissioned	Decommissioned	Fate	Notes
Hunt class	HMSAS Protea (1922)	HMS Ventnor (1917); HMS Verwood (1918); HMS Crozier (1919)		1 April 1922	30 April 1933	Returned to RN 30 April 1933	Builder: William Simons & Co, Renfrew, Scotland, 1919. Sold by tender to Protea Showboat (Pty) Ltd, Cape Town.
Flower class	HMSAS Protea (1947)	HMS Rockrose; HMSAS Protea	K51	4 October 1947	January 1957	Paid off to reserve. Sold by tender in 1962. Broken up, Table Bay, 1967.	Builder: C. Hill & Sons, Bristol, 1941. Converted to survey vessel in 1946.
	A331	Department of Transport; RV RSA	A331	23 April 1978	17 March 1980	Transferred back to South African Department of Transport.	Built by Fujinagata Shipbuilding and Engineering Co. Ltd, Osaka, Japan.

=== Training ships ===
Class	Name	Previous names	Pennant	Commissioned	Decommissioned	Fate	Notes
	SATS General Botha	HMS Thames		1 April 1922	30 April 1933	Scuttled in False Bay on 13 May 1947	Named for the first PM of the Union of South Africa Louis Botha
	SAS Navigator						Built by Fred Nicols (Pty) Ltd, Durban, South Africa.

=== Salvage vessels ===
Class	Name	Previous names	Pennant	Commissioned	Decommissioned	Battle Honours	Fate	Notes
	HMSAS Gamtoos	SS Gamtoos	W122	10 October 1942	1946	Mediterranean 1943-45; Italy 1944; South France 1944	Transferred to Department of Agriculture in 1946. Expended as a target on 10 June 1976.	Builder: Scott & Sons, Glasgow, Scotland, 1936. Bought from Smiths Coasters, Durban in 1942.
King Salvor class	HMSAS Salvestor	RFA Salvestor	W176	31 August 1944	1946	Mediterranean 1944-45; Aegean 1944; Pacific 1945	Returned to Royal Navy	Built by William Simons & Co, Renfrew, Scotland. Launched 28 August 1942. Operated by SANF personnel in the Mediterranean and Far East. Broken up for scrap at Briton Ferry in 1970.
	SAS Fleur		P3148				Sold to Neill Scott-Williams in 2010 and deployed to Subtech Marine of Durban as a Support/Supply Vessel	Built by Dorman & Long, Durban, South Africa (1969). Torpedo recovery and diving tender.

=== Cable layer vessels ===
Class	Name	Previous names	Pennant	Commissioned	Decommissioned	Battle Honours	Fate	Notes
Kil class	HMSAS Mead	MV Kilmeade; HMS Kilmead		27 August 1942	1947	S Afr Waters: 1944-1945	Returned to owners in August 1947	Builder: Smith's Dock Co. Ltd, Glasgow, Middlesbrough, 1919. Requisitioned from Smiths Coasters, Durban in 1942.

=== Examination vessels ===
Class	Name	Previous names	Pennant	Commissioned	Decommissioned	Fate	Notes
	HMSAS Clara					Scuttled off Robben Island in Table Bay in 1961	Also used as supply tender in Cape Town and Walvis Bay. Circa 1941.
	HMSAS Stork						
	HMSAS William Messina						

=== Tugs ===
Class	Name	Previous names	Pennant	Commissioned	Decommissioned	Fate	Notes
Tug	SAS De Noord			1963	2014		Replaced by new Damen Tug
Tug	SAS De Neys			1969	2015		Replaced by new Damen Tug
Tug	SAS De Mist			1978	2016	Sunk at mooring, awaiting salvage on 10 November 2018	Replaced by new Damen Tug

Ships related to above classes
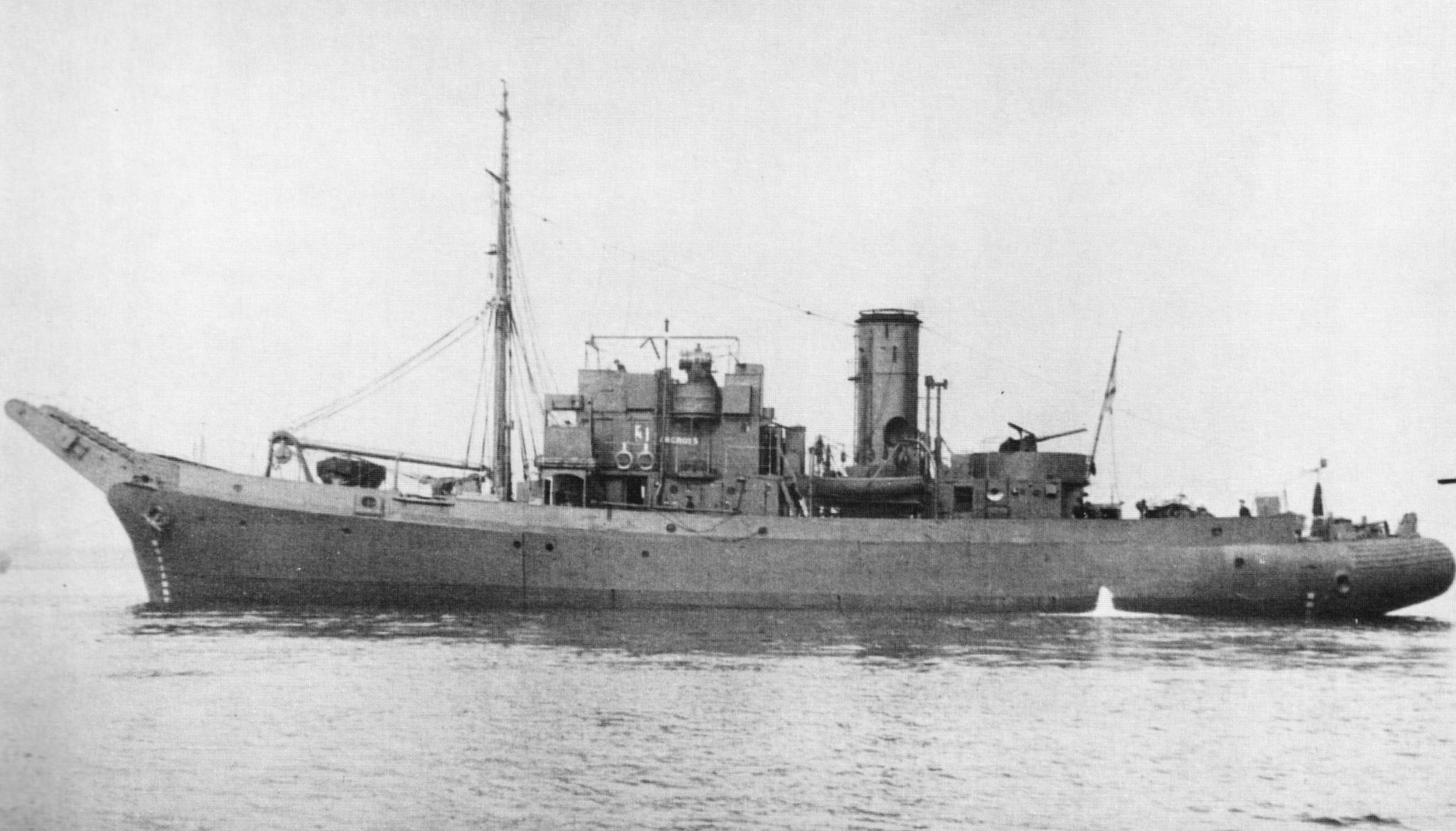
HMS Barcross (1943), later renamed SAS Somerset.

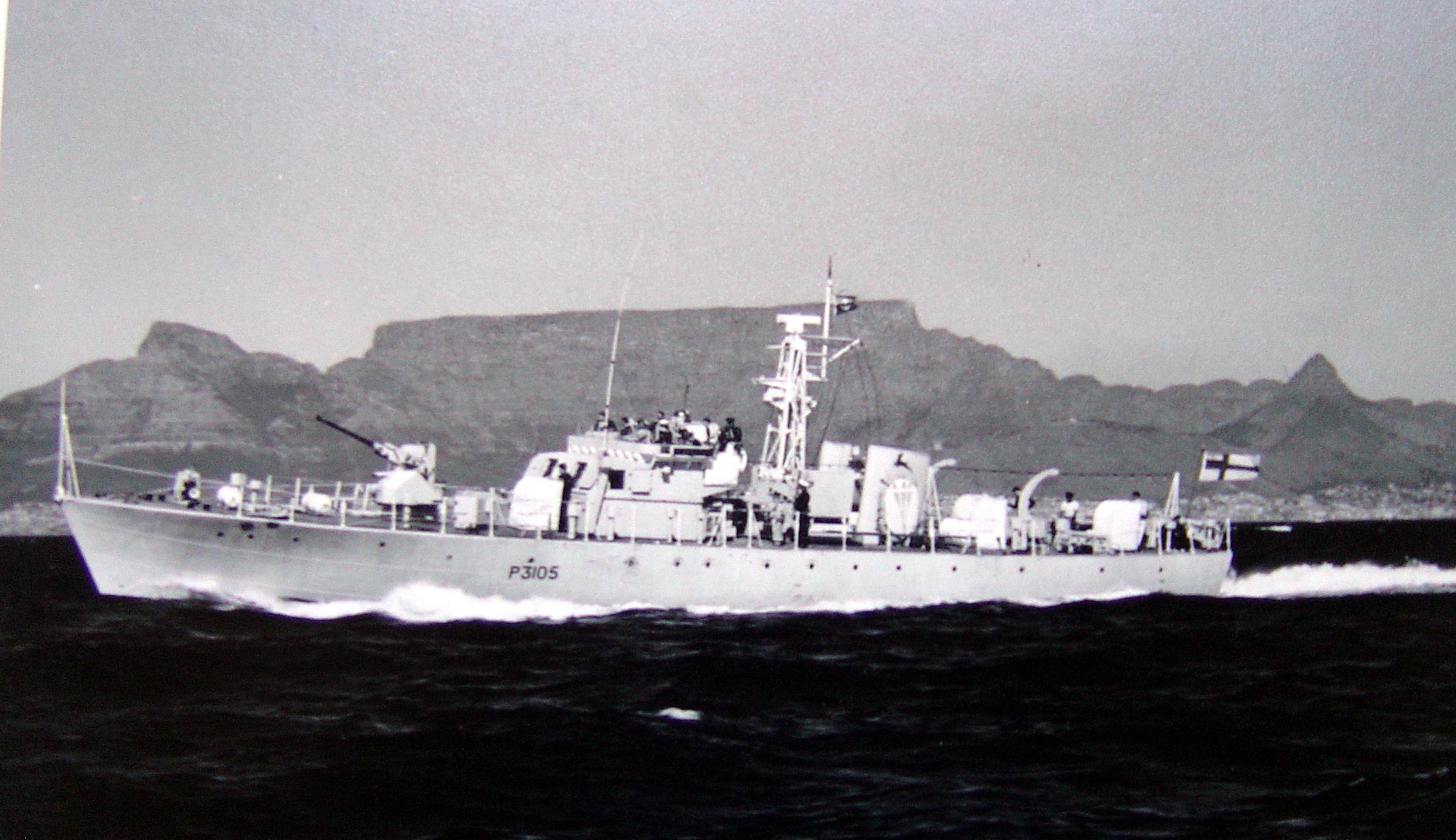
The Ford-class SAS Gelderland in Table Bay

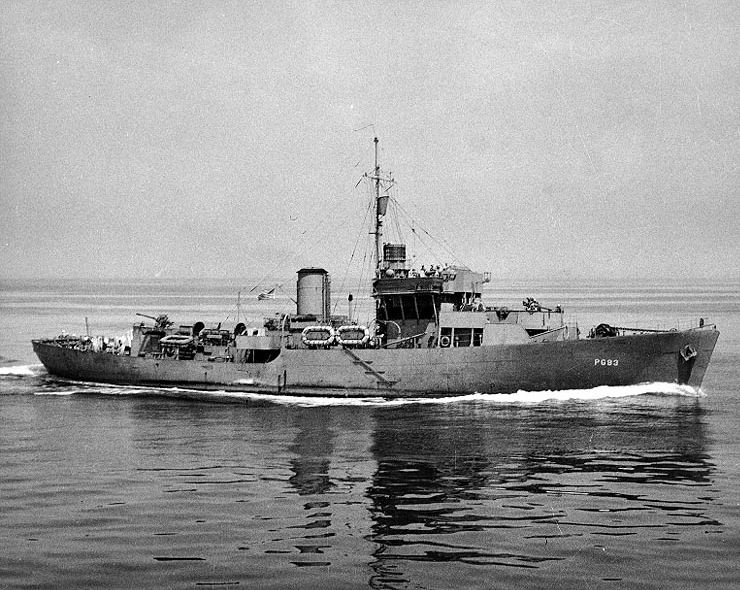
Flower-class corvette. SAS Protea was converted to a hydrographic survey vessel by the conversion of such a corvette.

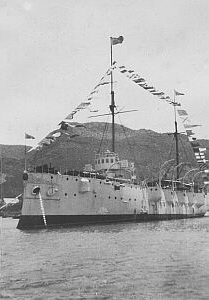
SATS General Botha circa 1926

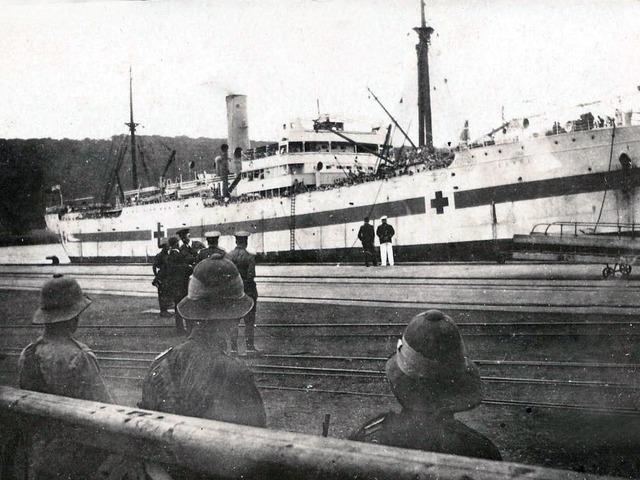
HMHS Ebani in East Africa

== Notes and references ==
=== Bibliography ===
- Bennett, CH (2008). South Africa's Navy. SA Navy. ISBN 978-0-620-41446-3.
- Brederode, William (14 April 2024). "South African WW2 naval legend to be scrapped at V&A Waterfront after falling into disrepair". News24.
- Du Toit, Allan (1992). South Africa's Fighting Ships: Past and Present. Rivonia, South Africa: Ashanti Publishing. ISBN 1-874800-50-2.
- Janes (2001). Janes Fighting Ships of World War II. Random House. ISBN 1-85170-494-9.
- Janes Fighting Ships of World War II. Random House. 1989 [Litho reprint of 1945/46 Ed]. ISBN 1-85170-494-9.
- Lenton, H. T. (1967). Warships of the British & Commonwealth navies. Allan.
- The Observation Post. 6 April 2017.
- Turner, L.C.F. (1961). War in the Southern Oceans: 1939-45. Cape Town: Oxford University Press.

== See also ==
- List of ships of the South African Navy
- Simonstown Agreement
