= Africana =

Africana may refer to:

== In arts and entertainment ==
=== Music ===
- Africana, album by Chaino
- Africana, album by Teresa De Sio
- "Africana", song by Romanian singer Delia Matache

=== Publications ===
- Encyclopedia Africana (1999), a compendium of Africana studies
- Philosophia Africana, a peer-reviewed academic journal of Africana philosophy established in 1998
- Polyglotta Africana, an 1854 study comparing 156 African languages

== Other uses ==
- Africana studies, the study of the histories, politics and cultures of peoples of African origin
- Africana Museum (now MuseuMAfricA), historical museum in Johannesburg, South Africa
- Africana (artifacts), cultural artifacts relating to African history and culture
- Africana (sheep), a breed of domesticated sheep found in Colombia and Venezuela
- Galinha à Africana, a barbecued chicken dish of Portuguese origin
- HMSAS Africana, World War II South African minesweeper

== See also ==
- Africanae (disambiguation)
- Africanis, a group of South African dogs not recognised as a breed
- Africanum
- Africanus (disambiguation)
- Afrikaner (disambiguation)
