= G. africanus =

G. africanus may refer to:

- Gigantosaurus africanus, a dinosaur species
- Gyps africanus, the white-backed vulture, an Old World vulture species

== See also ==
- Africanus (disambiguation)
