= V. africana =

V. africana may refer to:

- Verbena africana, a plant species in the genus Verbena
- Voacanga africana, a tree species

== See also ==
- Africana (disambiguation)
