= B. africanus =

B. africanus may refer to:

- Bubo africanus, the Spotted Eagle-owl, a medium-sized species of owl species
- Buphagus africanus, the Yellow-billed Oxpecker, a passerine bird species

== See also ==
- Africanus (disambiguation)
