= A499 =

A499 may refer to:

- A499 road (Wales)
- RFA Salvestor (A499), a ship
