= Africanus =

Africanus is Latin for "African". It may refer to:

== People ==
=== Ancient Roman cognomen ===
- Africanus Fabius Maximus, a Roman senator, the younger son of Quintus Fabius Maximus (consul 45 BC)
- Cresconius Africanus, a Latin canon lawyer, probably fl. latter half of 7th century
- Julius Africanus, an orator in the time of Nero (r. 54–68)
- Titus Sextius Africanus (1st century), a censor of Gaul
- Lucius Apuleius Africanus Madaurensis (c. 124–170), a Latin-language prose writer
- Titus Sextius Cornelius Africanus, a consul under Trajan (r. 98–117)
- Sextus Caecilius Africanus (2nd century), a Roman legal scholar
- Scipio Africanus (disambiguation)
- Sextus Julius Africanus (c. 160 – c. 240), a Christian traveller and historian
- Junillus Africanus (fl. 541–549), a Quaestor of the Sacred Palace in the court of the Byzantine Emperor Justinian I
- Constantine the African (11th century), i.e. Constantinus Africanus, a physician who lived in the 11th century.

=== Given name or surname ===
- George Africanus (1763–1834), a West African slave, later credited as Nottingham's first black entrepreneur
- Leo Africanus (1488–1554), an Andalusi diplomat and author
- Scipio Africanus (disambiguation)
- Africanus Horton (1835–1883), also known as James Beale, a writer and folklorist from Sierra Leone
- Albert Freeman Africanus King (1841–1914), American physician

== Other uses ==
- Africanus (journal), a scientific journal about development problems with special reference to the Third World and southern Africa

== See also ==
- Australopithecus africanus, an extinct species of australopithecine
- Africana (disambiguation)
- Africanae (disambiguation)
- Africanis, a group of South African dogs not recognised as a breed
- Africanum
