= SAS Somerset =

Boom defence vessel of the South African Navy during World War II

Coordinates: 33.908426°S 18.417621°E

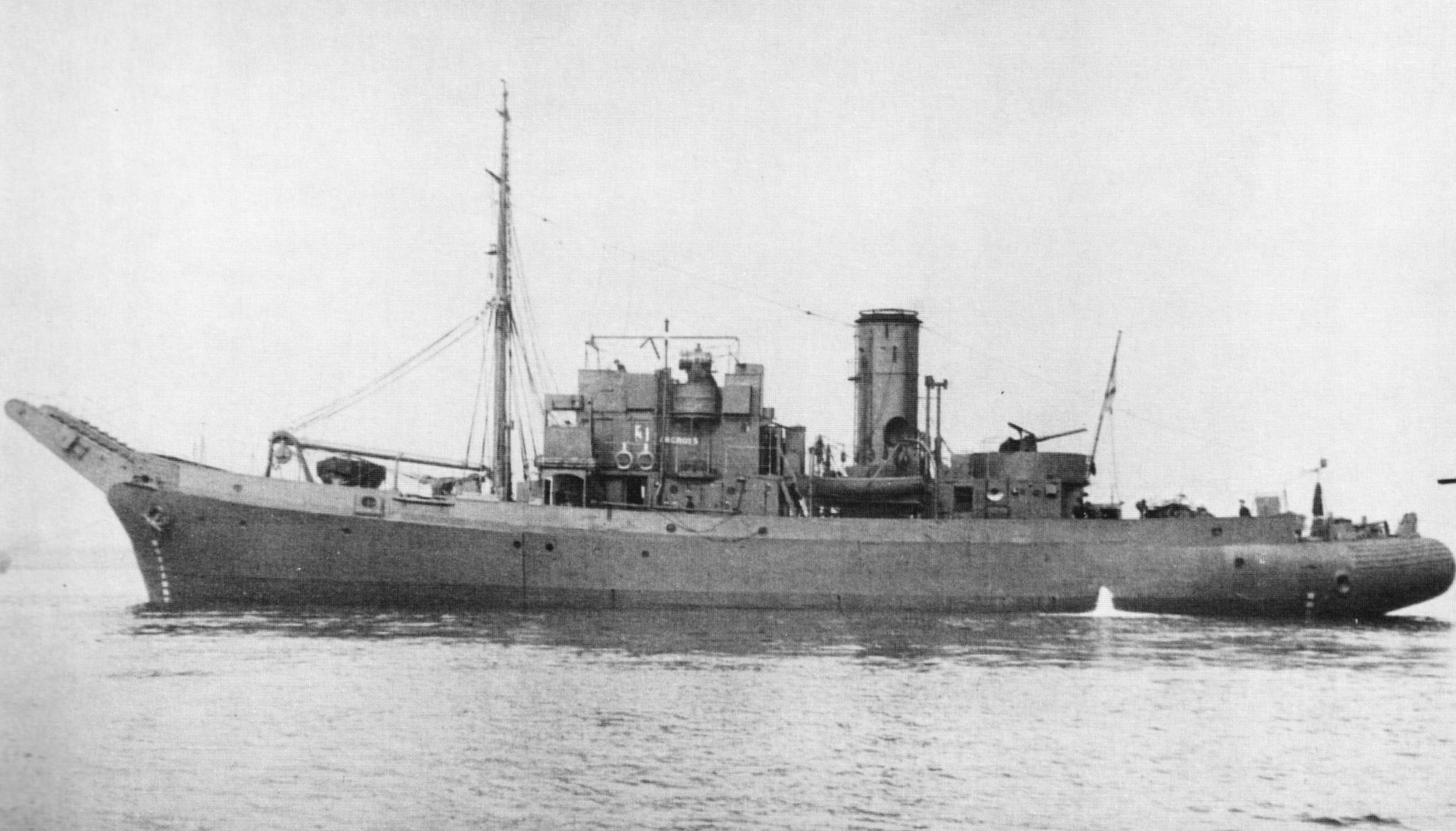
- HMS Barcross

History

United Kingdom
- Name: HMS Barcross
- Owner: Royal Navy
- Builder: Blyth Harbour and Dock Company, Blyth, Northumberland, England
- Laid down: 15 April 1941
- Launched: 21 October 1941
- Decommissioned: 1947
- Out of service: Transferred to South African Naval Forces, 21 January 1943
- Renamed: HMSAS Somerset in 1943
- Identification: Pennant number: Z185

South Africa
- Name: HMSAS Somerset
- Namesake: Dick King's horse (Note: The ship was named after famous horse that carried Dick King from Durban to Grahamstown in 1842. The connection is perpetuated in the seahorse on the ship's crest.)
- Builder: Blyth Shipyard
- Commissioned: 21 January 1943
- Renamed: SAS Somerset, 1951
- Home port: Simon's Town
- Identification: Pennant number: P285
- Badge

South Africa
- Name: SAS Somerset
- Owner: South African Navy
- Decommissioned: 31 March 1986
- Home port: Simon's Town
- Identification: Pennant number: P285
- Fate: Scrapped in April 2024

General characteristics
- Class & type: Bar-class boom defence vessel
- Displacement: 750 tons standard; 960tons maximum
- Length: 45.72 m (150.0 ft)
- Beam: 9.76 m (32.0 ft)
- Draught: 3.37 m (11.1 ft)
- Propulsion: One vertical triple-expansion reciprocating steam engine
- Speed: 11.75 kn (21.76 km/h)
- Range: 3000 mi
- Complement: 32
- Armament: 1 × 12-pounder 12cwt gun

SAS Somerset, originally named HMS Barcross, was a Bar-class boom defence vessel of the South African Navy. It operated in Saldanha Bay, was transferred to South Africa Naval Forces during World War II, and was purchased by South Africa in 1947. From 1986 it was preserved as a museum ship in Cape Town, before being scrapped in April 2024.

== History ==
=== Construction and navy service ===
Somerset was originally built in Blyth, Northumberland, United Kingdom, by Blyth Shipbuilding Company and commissioned as HMS Barcross in 1941. HMS Barcross and her sister ship HMS Barbrake arrived at the Cape Station at Simon's Town, South Africa, in 1942. HMS Barcross was transferred to Saldanha Bay for boom defence operations thereafter. In 1943, she was re-designated as HMSAS Barcross when she was transferred to the South African Naval Forces for the remainder of World War II.

In 1946, the Government of South Africa purchased Barcross and used it for the dumping of ammunition off Cape Town and Port Elizabeth. On completion of these services, she was transferred to Salisbury Island in Durban and subsequently was laid up at Salisbury Island.

In 1951, her name was changed to Somerset. In 1953, while still decommissioned, Somerset was used in the raising of the sunken minelayer Skilpad (ex-Spindrift) at Salisbury Island.

=== Recommissioning (1955) ===
In 1955, Somerset was recommissioned. During this period, she was tasked with salvaging the remains of two Harvard trainer aircraft following a midair collision over Table Bay. Six weeks later, she recovered a third Harvard which had crashed into the sea off Bok Point. During a refit in 1959, Somerset had her coal-fired boilers converted to firing by furnace oil. She was responsible for the laying of an oil pipeline at the port of Mossel Bay to serve the oil terminal there.

In 1961, Somerset salvaged the South African Railways tug Schermbrucker, which had sunk in the harbour at East London. In 1967, she was fitted with new boilers and a reconditioned main engine. In 1968, her services were called on again to assist the cable ship, John W. Mackay, in raising and repairing the newly inaugurated overseas telephone cable in the shallow waters of Melkbosstrand. In 1969, Somerset raised the old whale catcher, Wagter 11, in Saldanha Bay and subsequently towed her back to Simon's Town. During the same year, she salvaged a floating crane which had capsized and sunk at Port Elizabeth. In the early hours of 24 July 1974, Somerset was dispatched to Cape Agulhas to assist with the salvage of the Oriental Pioneer, but poor weather conditions and bad luck rendered this effort unsuccessful. In 1981, Somerset raised the fishing trawler Aldebaran, which had lain on the harbour bottom at Port Elizabeth for over two-and-a-half years. Somerset also acted as a standby vessel during submarine shallow-water diving operations. In 1983, she assisted in salvaging a barge and two whale catchers at Saldanha Bay.

=== Maritime museum ===
In March 1986, Somerset was finally paid off. In 1988, the old boom defence vessel was donated for use as a museum ship, moored at the waterfront at Cape Town. Her original Royal Navy badge can be seen displayed on the side of the Selborne drydock.

Somerset was moored on the Victoria & Alfred Waterfront in Cape Town from 2 September 1988 as museum ship until its scrapping in April 2024. At the time of its scrapping it was the only boom defence vessel remaining in the world, as well as the only remaining South African warship that served in World War II.

== Gallery ==
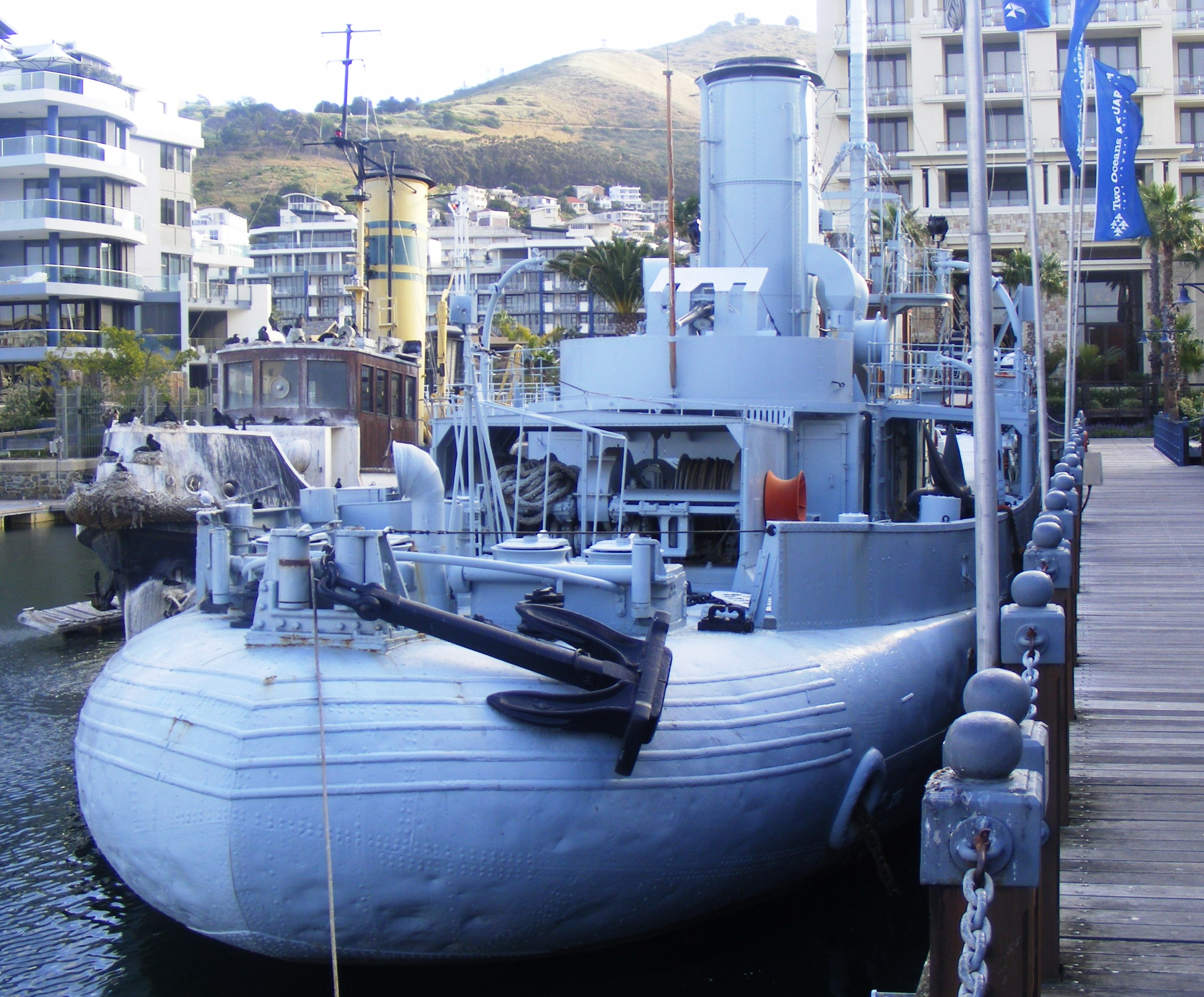
SAS Somerset on the Victoria & Alfred Waterfront, September 2010 (stern view)

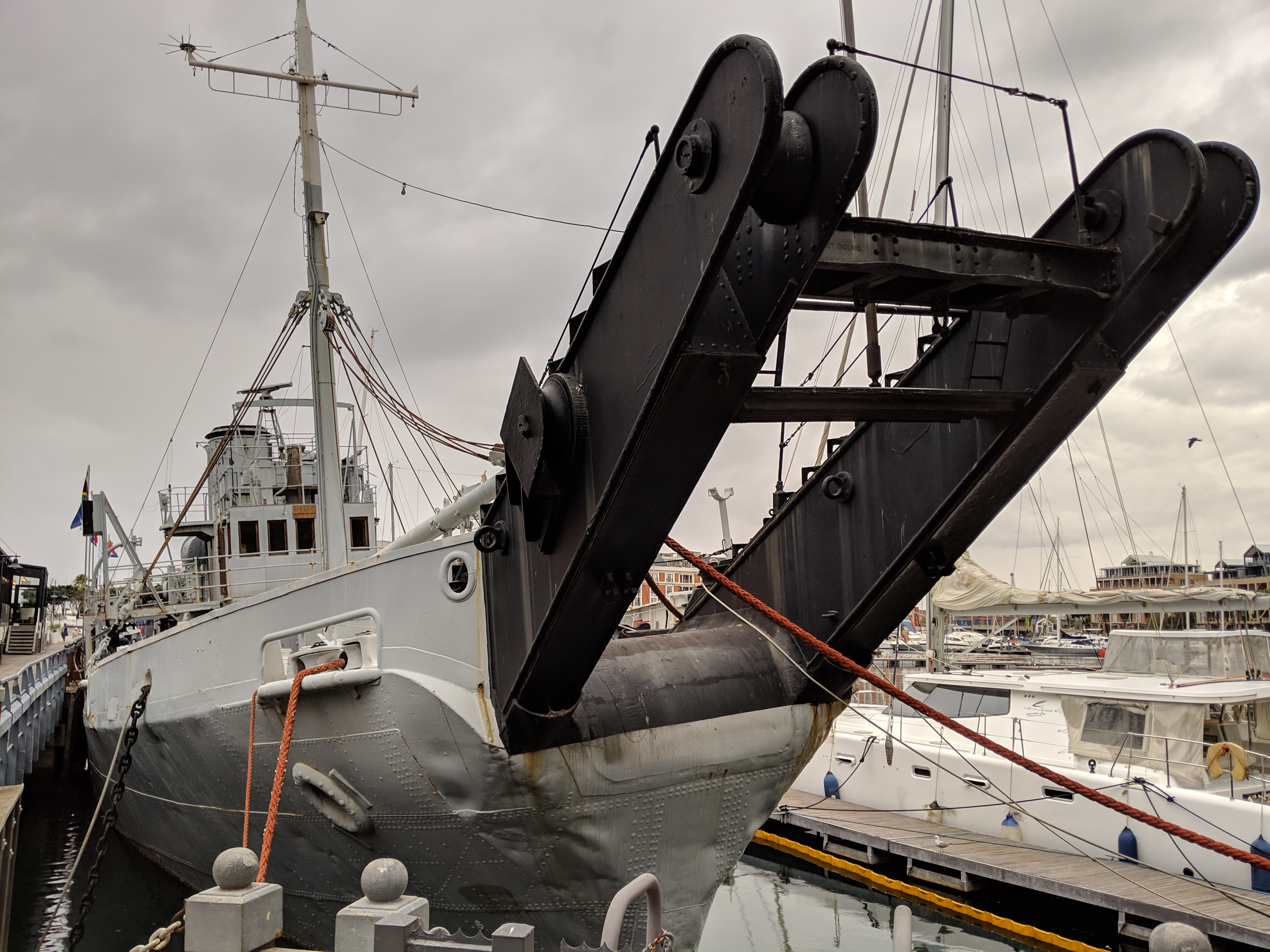
SAS Somerset (bow view) in 2019

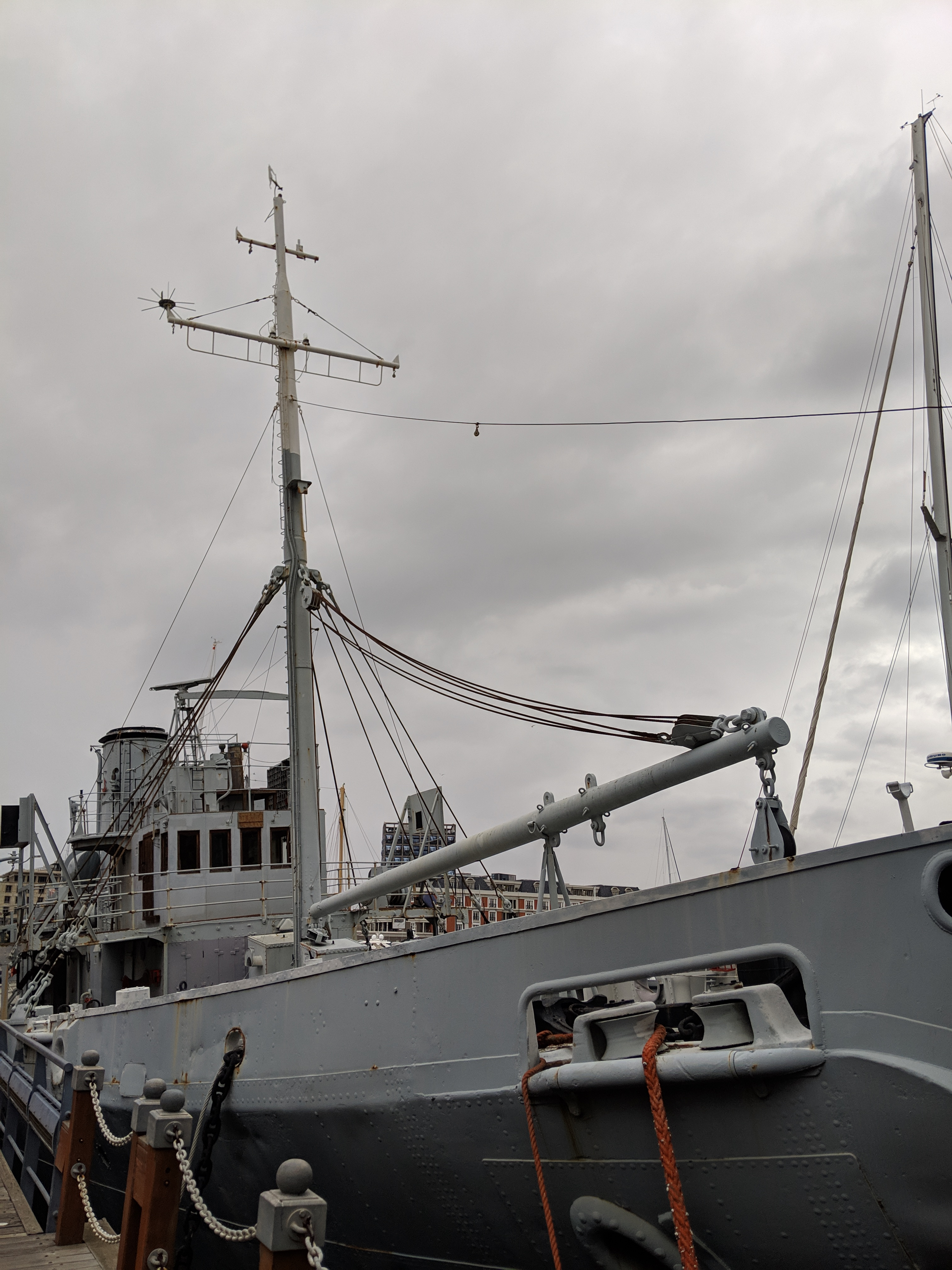
View of SAS Somerset's bridge and crane in 2019

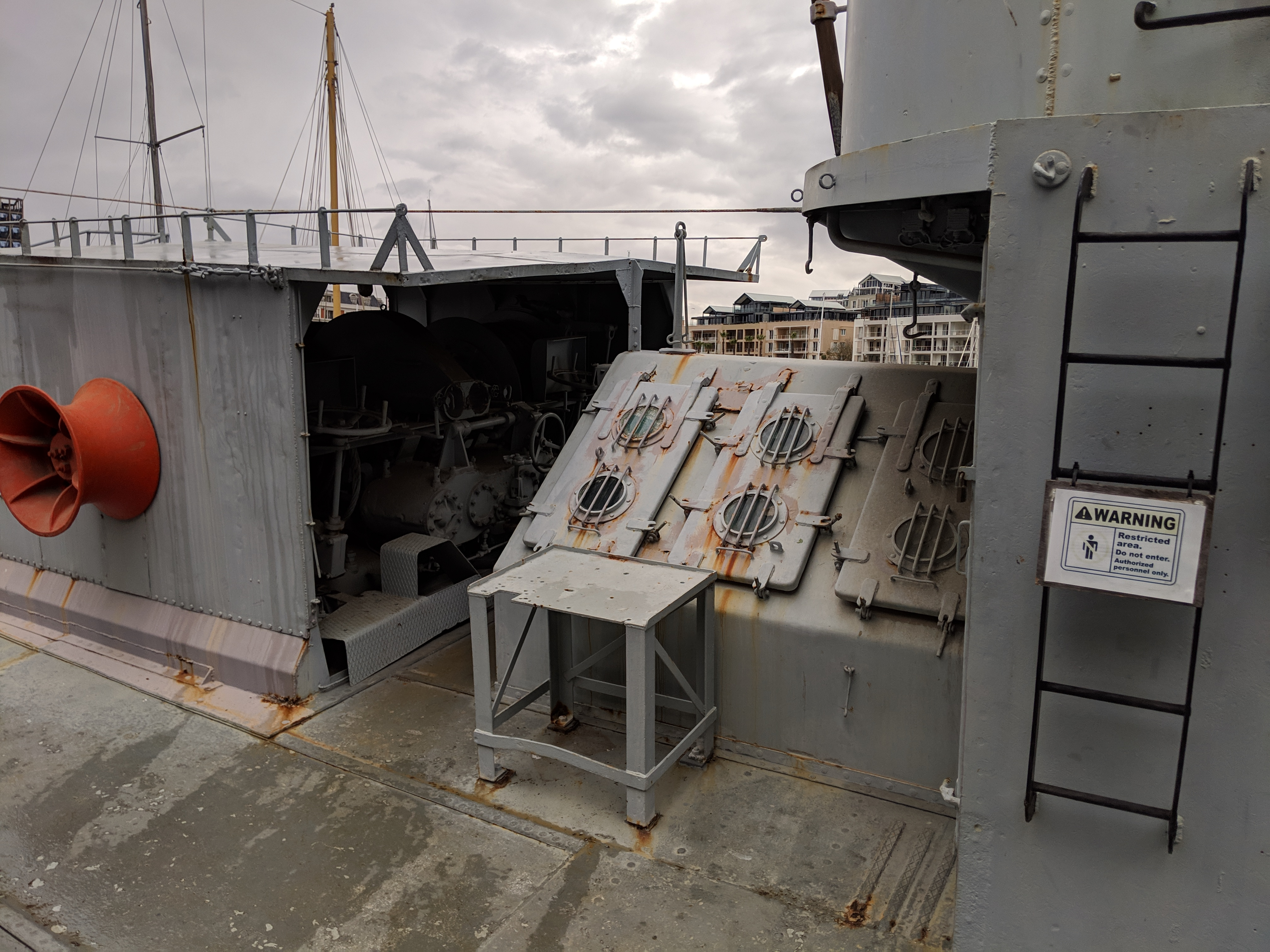
SAS Somerset's winching gear situated amidships, 2019

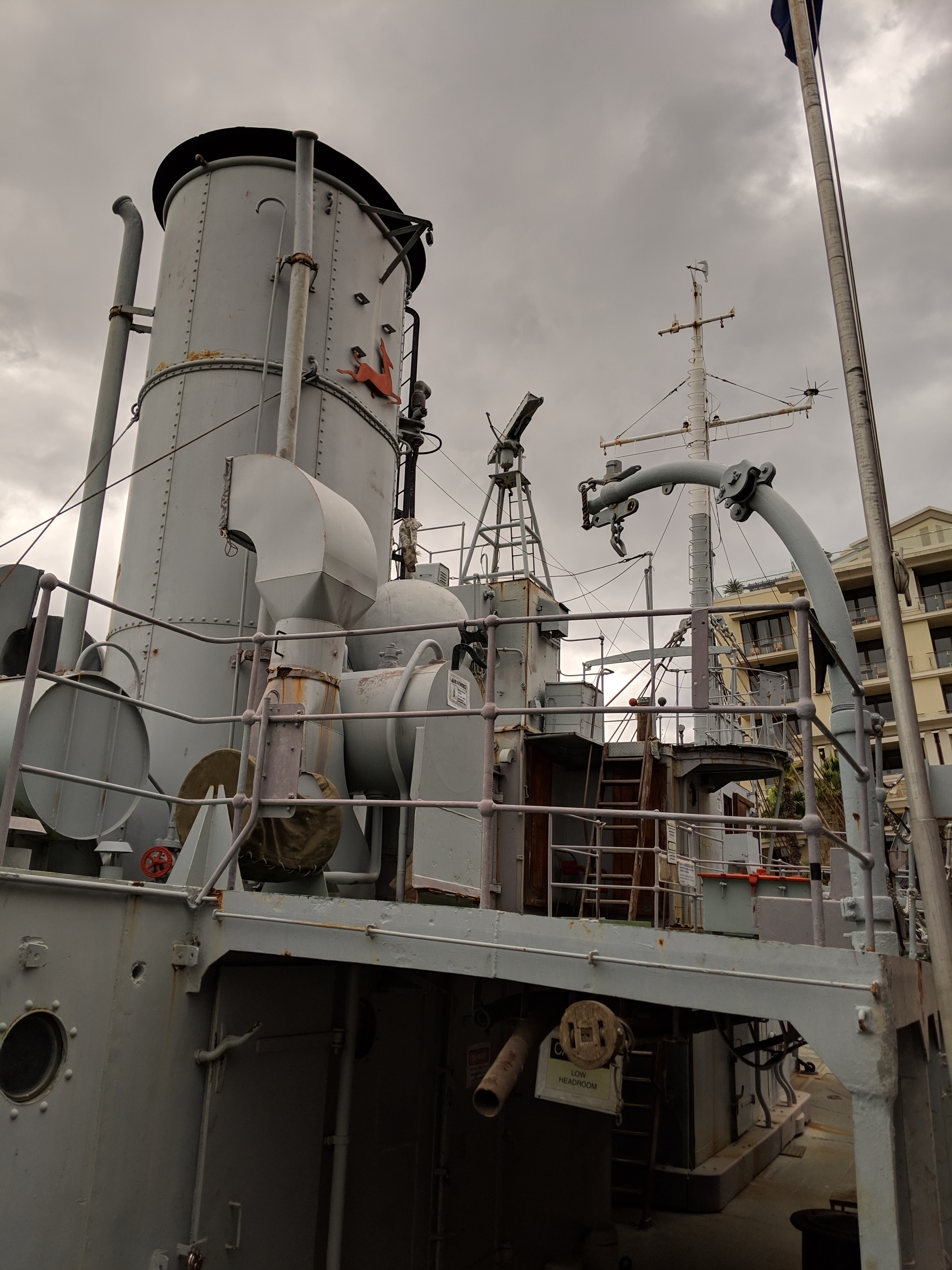
SAS Somerset's funnel and top deck in 2019

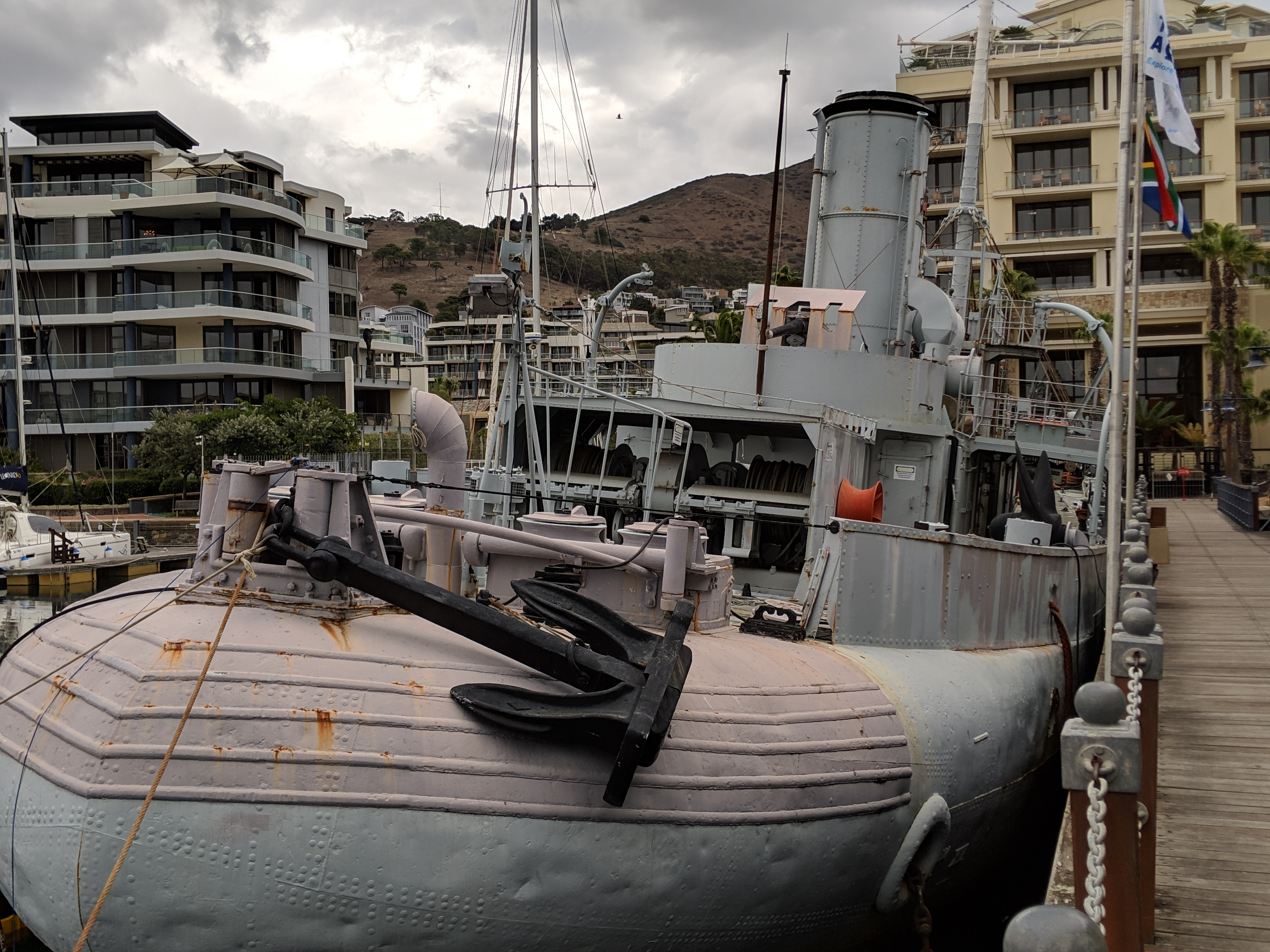
SAS Somerset from astern in 2019
