= Simonstown Agreement =

Naval cooperation agreement between the UK and South Africa

The Simonstown Agreement [sic] was a naval cooperation agreement between the United Kingdom and South Africa, signed on 30 June 1955. Under the agreement, the Royal Navy (RN) gave up its naval base at Simon's Town, South Africa, and transferred command of the South African Navy (SAN) to the government of South Africa. In return, South Africa promised the use of the Simonstown base to Royal Navy ships. The agreement also permitted South Africa to buy six anti-submarine frigates, ten coastal minesweepers and four seaward defence boats from the UK valued at £18 million over the next eight years.

In effect, the agreement was a mutual defence arrangement aimed at protecting sea routes between the UK and the Middle East. The agreement was controversial because of South Africa's policy of racial separation known as apartheid.

In the planning stages, the agreement was intended to include:

- the combined use of Simon’s Town by the Royal Navy and South African Navy in peace and in war (even if South Africa were neutral in some non-Communist war, a most remote contingency), on the understanding that the base would also be available in war to the allies of the United Kingdom;
- the gradual assumption of responsibility by the South African Navy for the operation and administration of the base for combined use;
- the assumption by South Africa of responsibility in war for the operational and administrative control of a local sub-area of a South Atlantic Strategic Zone; and
- that a Royal Navy officer would continue as Commander-in-Chief, South Atlantic in peace, with headquarters and communications at the Cape, and that his designation in war would be Commander of the South Atlantic Strategic Zone.

As actually signed, there were three Simonstown Agreements, in the form of an exchange of letters between Minister Frans Erasmus and Selwyn Lloyd.

These agreements were:

1) Agreement on Defence of the Sea Routes round Southern Africa:

Extracts from the letters and memoranda dated 30 June 1955 exchanged between the Governments of the United Kingdom and South Africa were included in 1974 Cabinet papers published by The National Archives many years later:

- 4. After the control and administration of the Simonstown Naval Base are handed over to the Union Government in accordance with the provisions of the Agreement relating to that subject, the Royal Naval Commander-in-Chief, South Atlantic, will continue to fly the flag to which he is entitled by Royal Naval regulations in the Cape area outside Simonstown and to exercise command over any Royal Naval units in the Union.
- 5. He will also be designated for purposes of planning and operational command in war as Commander-in-Chief of a maritime strategic zone, the boundaries of which will approximate to those of the Royal Naval South Atlantic Station, and will include the Mozambique Channel.
- 6 - 8 [not included in extracted text]
- 9. In peacetime the Commander-in-Chief will be directly responsible only to the United Kingdom Government and will have no executive authority over South African forces, establishments, and services. He will, however, have as one of his primary functions the guiding of maritime war planning in the strategic zone, and will be free to confer on these matters, in consultation with the South African Naval Chief of Staff, with the Union Minister of Defence.
- 10. A joint maritime war planning committee will be set up, containing representatives of the Royal Navy and the South African Navy, one of whose functions will be to co-ordinate the use of all maritime facilities in British and South African territories in the strategic zone.
- 11. [not included in extracted text]
- 12. Since on the transfer of the control of the Simonstown Naval Base in accordance with the provisions of the Agreement relating to that subject, Admiralty House, and the adjacent offices and residences will be transferred to the Union Government, the Union Government will in agreement with the United Kingdom Government provide headquarters in the Cape area, but outside Simonstown, with requisite communications and operational facilities, for use by the Commander-in-Chief in peace and war.

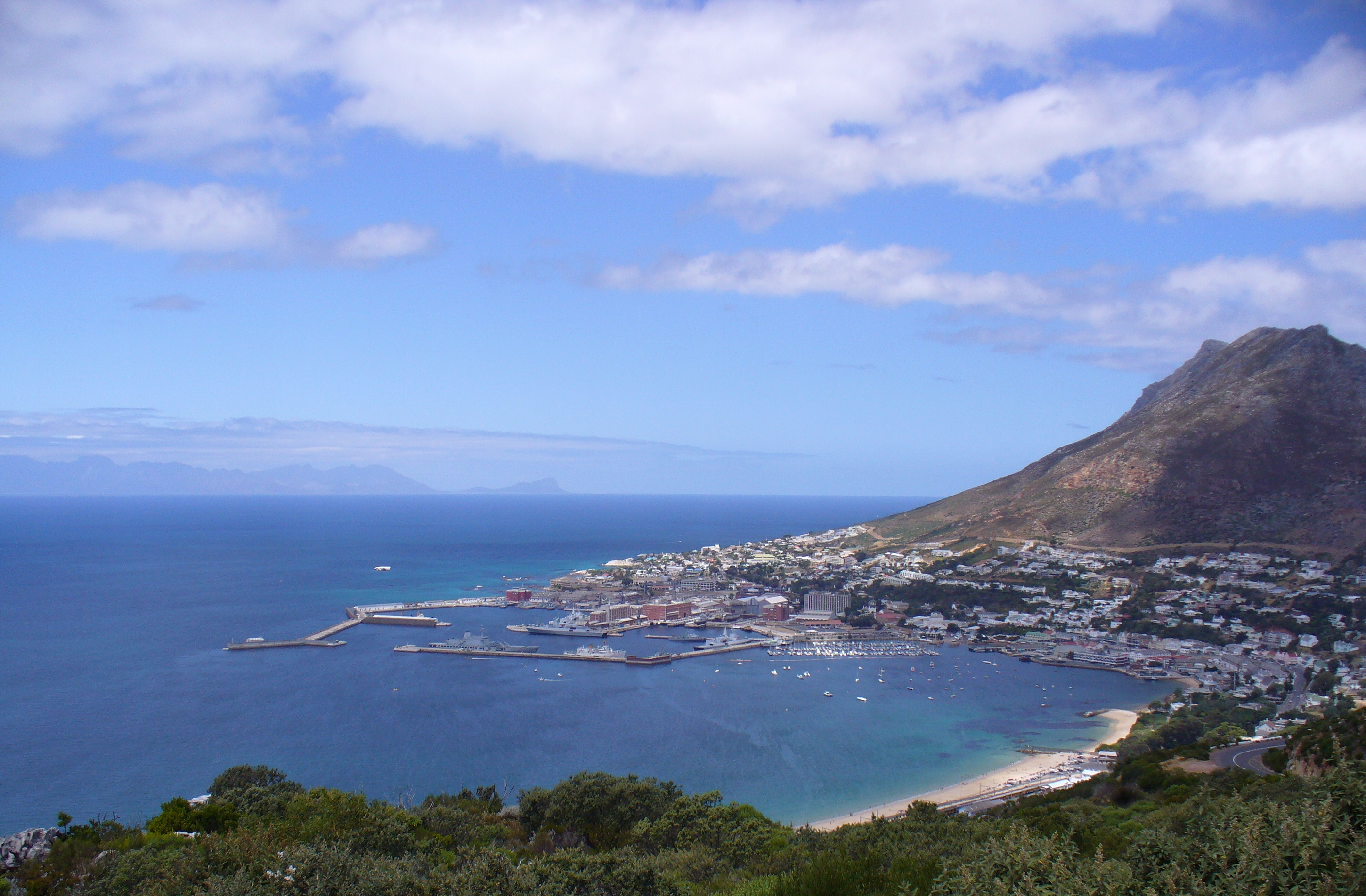
Simon's Town Harbour in 2006

2) Transfer of the Simonstown Naval Base
3) Ancillary Financial and Administrative arrangements

The government of the UK terminated the agreement on 16 June 1975. Ships of the Royal Navy continued to call periodically at Simon's Town and other South African ports, however the Royal Navy was not able to use any South African ports during the Falklands War.

South Africa was a member state of the Commonwealth of Nations at the time the agreement was signed, under the name 'Union of South Africa', so the UK and South Africa took the position that the agreement was not an international treaty requiring registration with the United Nations under Article 102 of the United Nations Charter.

== See also ==
- Military alliance
- Military history of South Africa
- List of decommissioned ships of the South African Navy
- List of military alliances
