= Afrikaner (disambiguation) =

Afrikaners are a South African ethnic group.

Afrikaner may also refer to:

- The Afrikaner dynasty of the Oorlam people in Namibia
- Afrikaner cattle, an indigenous South African breed of cattle historically primarily kept and herded by the Khoikhoi people
- Afrikaner sheep, an indigenous South African sheep breed
- HMSAS Afrikander, Navy, Gadfly-class flat-iron gunboat
- Some species of Gladiolus

== See also ==
- Africana (disambiguation)
