= Southern-class whaler =

1918 class of minesweeper trawler of the Royal Navy

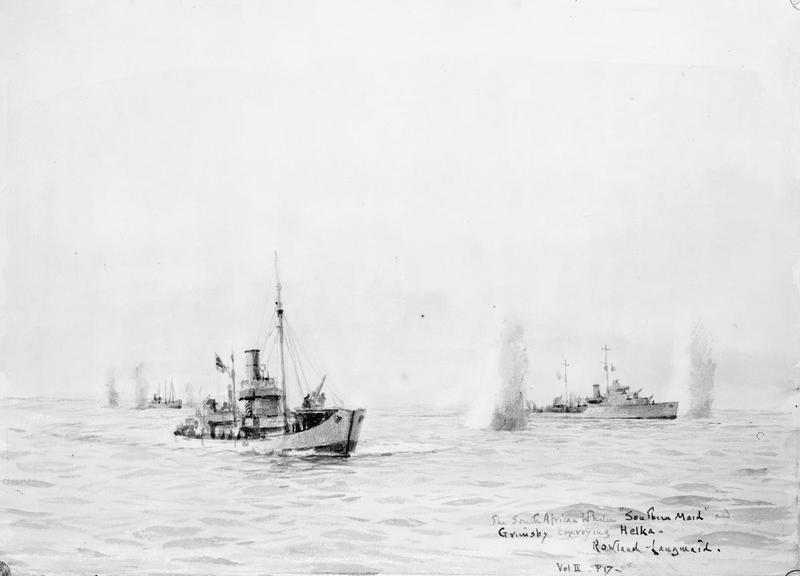
- Illustration of HMSAS Southern Maid in the Mediterranean in November–December 1942

Class overview
- Name: Southern-class whalers
- Builders: Bremer Vulkan, Vegesack, Germany
- Operators: Royal Navy; South African Navy
- Built: 1936
- In service: 1937-
- In commission: 1940–1945
- Completed: 6
- Active: 6
- Laid up: 5
- Lost: 1

General characteristics
- Type: Whaler
- Tonnage: 344 GRT
- Length: 42.46 m (139 ft 4 in)
- Beam: 7.96 m (26 ft 1 in)
- Draught: 4.18 m (13 ft 9 in)
- Propulsion: 1 × oil-fired 3 cyl, triple expansion reciprocating engine, single shaft, 1 screw
- Speed: 13 knots (24 km/h; 15 mph) maximum
- Armament: 1 × QF 4" naval gun, 3 × 20 mm guns (2 × fwd, 1 × aft), various light weapons.

The Southern class was a class of whale-catcher ships requisitioned from a commercial whaling company for service during the Second World War. The whalers were converted for anti-submarine and minesweeping duties and were in use in the British Royal Navy and South African Navy. Six ships were built in Germany for the Southern Whaling Company and after the war, one was retained in the South African Navy, one had been sunk by a mine and four were sold back to commercial whaling companies.

== History ==
The six whale catchers were owned by Southern Whaling & Sealing Co. Ltd., London, United Kingdom and were used for whale catching in the Southern Ocean and Antarctic waters. The fleet of six ships was accompanied by the factory ship Southern Princess in their annual whaling season sorties. The fleet spent four seasons in the Antarctic before being requisitioned for naval service on their return to Cape Town after completion of the 1939–40 season. The owners requested that all six ships were to be taken up into the Royal Navy, but only Southern Breeze was taken up for service in the UK, with the other five vessels being assigned to the South African Seaward Defence Force (the renamed South African Naval Service).

== Ships ==
"AS Whaler" denotes anti-submarine equipped whaler.

Southern class whalers
Name	Pennant number	Previous name(s)	In service with	Launch date	Requisitioned date	In-service date	Role	Fate
HMS Southern Breeze	FY318	SS Southern Breeze	Royal Navy	Jun 1936	Mar 1940			Sep 1941: Bought by Salvesen while under RN command – name remained unchanged. Returned to Salvesen in January 1946. Broken up for scrap in Sep 1970 by Goldfields Metal Traders Ltd., Fremantle
HMSAS Southern Floe	T26	SS Southern Floe	S. Afr. Seaward Defence Force	1936	18 Jun 1940	Oct 1940	AS Whaler	Sunk by mine off Tobruk on 11 Feb 1941
HMSAS Southern Maid	T27	SS Southern Maid	S. Afr. Seaward Defence Force	1936	18 Jun 1940	Oct 1940	AS Whaler	Laid up May 1946. Sold to Union Whaling Co on 7 May 1946. Fate unknown.
HMSAS Southern Barrier; HMSAS Steenberg	T28	SS Southern Barrier	S. Afr. Seaward Defence Force	1936	17 Jul 1940	5 Oct 1940	Minesweeper	In September 1941, vessel was sold to Chr. Salvesen & Co who retained the name until January 1945 when vessel was in-turn sold to Union Government of South Africa as a minesweeper and named HMSAS Steenberg T.28.
HMSAS Southern Isles	T29	SS Southern Isles	S. Afr. Seaward Defence Force	1936	22 Jul 1940	Nov 1940	AS Whaler	Laid up May 1946. Sold to Union Whaling Co on 7 May 1946. Fate unknown.
HMSAS Southern Sea	T30	SS Southern Sea	S. Afr. Seaward Defence Force	1936	22 Jul 1940	Nov 1940	AS Whaler	Laid up May 1946. Sold to Union Whaling Co on 7 May 1946. Fate unknown.

== Notes and references ==
=== Bibliography ===
- Du Toit, Allan (1992). South Africa's Fighting Ships: Past and Present. Rivonia, South Africa: Ashanti Publishing. ISBN 1-874800-50-2.
