= Africana sheep =

Breed of sheep

Africana
- Other names: Camuro or Camura, Colombian Wooless, Pelona, Red African, Rojo Africana, West African
- Country of origin: Colombia
- Distribution: Colombia, Venezuela
- Use: Meat

Traits
- Wool color: Brown
- Horn status: Both sexes are polled (hornless)

The Africana is a breed of domesticated sheep (also known as Pelona, Camuro or Camura, Red African, Rojo Africana, Colombian Wooless, West African) found in Colombia and Venezuela. This breed is polled (hornless) and is about the same size as the Pelibüey. The Africana is raised for its meat and is classified as a hair breed.

== Characteristics ==
The Africana is often some shade of tan to brown.
