= Scipio Africanus (disambiguation) =

Scipio Africanus was a Roman general who defeated Hannibal.

The name may also refer to:

- Scipio Aemilianus (185-129 BC), also known as Scipio Africanus the Younger, adoptive grandson of the original Scipio Africanus
- Scipio Africanus (slave) (1702–1720), West African British slave
- Scipio Africanus (play), a 1718 historical tragedy by Charles Beckingham
- Scipio Africanus: The Defeat of Hannibal, a 1937 Italian propaganda film

== See also ==
- Scipio Africanus Jones (1863–1943), African American educator, jurist, and politician
- Scipio Africanus Sam Mussabini (1867–1927), English athletics coach best known for his work with Harold Abrahams
- Italian cruiser Scipione Africano, an Italian warship of World War II
