= Africanus (journal) =

- Discipline: Development studies
- Language: Afrikaans, English

Publication details
- History: 1971–present
- Publisher: UNISA Press (South Africa)
- Frequency: Biannually

Standard abbreviations
- ISO 4: Africanus

Indexing
- ISSN: 0304-615X

Links
- Journal homepage

Africanus is a biannual academic journal published by UNISA Press. The journal focuses on development problems with special reference to the Third World and Southern Africa.

== Abstracting and indexing ==
The journal is abstracted and indexed in Social Sciences Index, Ulrich's Periodical Directory, and African Urban and Regional Science Index.
