= SAS Skilpad =

South African WWII Navy Vessel

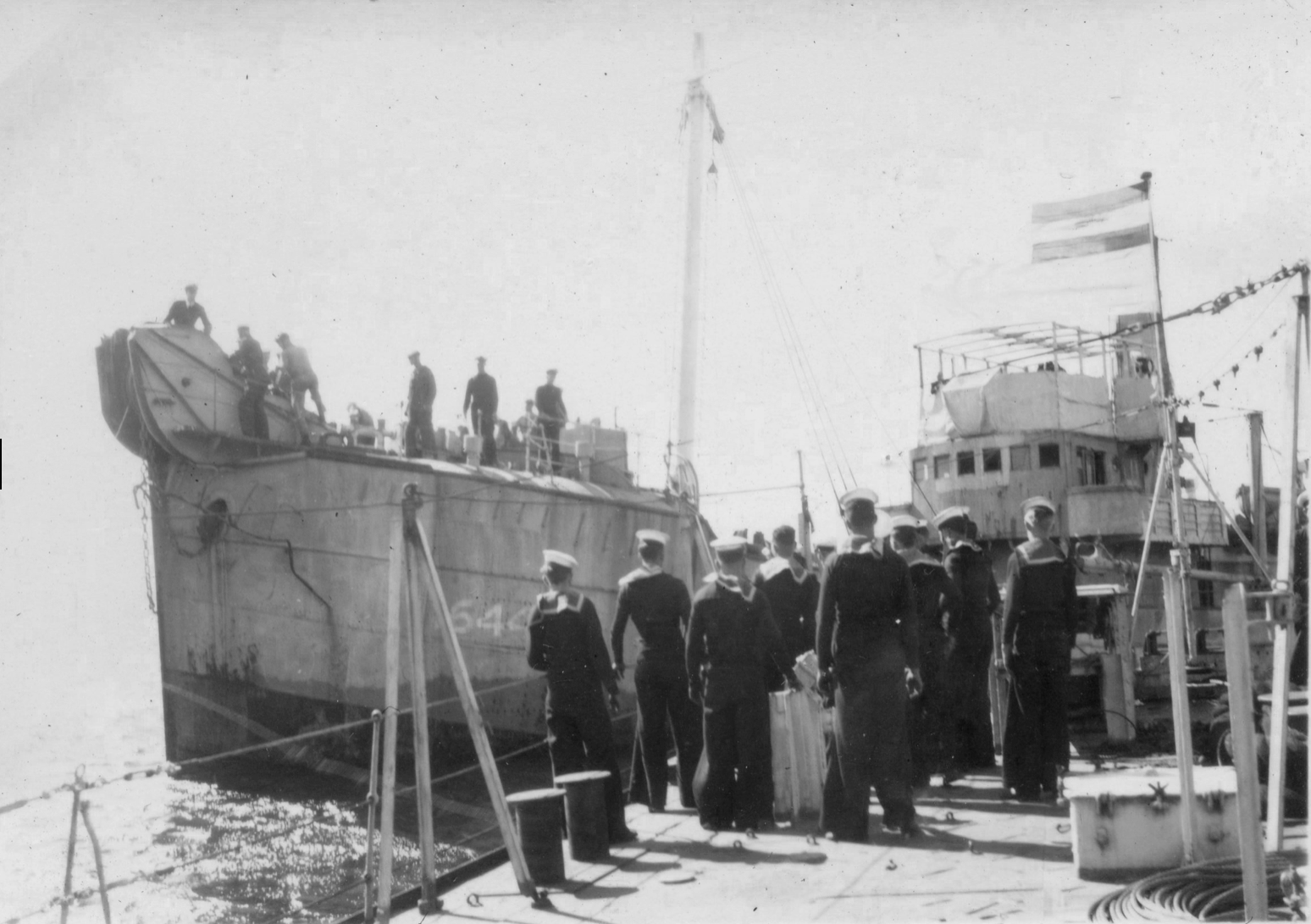
- HMSAS Spindrift being towed from Saldanha to Durban by HMSAS Transvaal, 1948.

History

Germany
- Name: Polaris
- Owner: Nazi Germany Kriegsmarine
- Launched: 1936
- Reclassified: Requisitioned by Nazi Germany Kriegsmarine in 1939
- Fate: Captured by Royal Navy 26 April 1940

United Kingdom
- Name: HMS Spindrift
- Home port: Portland
- Fate: Transferred to South Africa, 5 July 1943

South Africa
- Name: HMSAS Spindrift
- Owner: South African Naval Forces
- Home port: Saldanha Bay & Durban
- Fate: Renamed HMSAS Skilpad

South Africa
- Name: HMSAS Skilpad
- Owner: South African Naval Forces
- Home port: Saldanha Bay
- Fate: Renamed SAS Skilpad 1951

South Africa
- Name: SAS Skilpad
- Owner: South African Navy
- Home port: Salisbury Island, Durban
- Fate: Sunk at berth 22 July 1953. Sold for scrap May 1957.

General characteristics
- Displacement: 825 tons standard
- Length: 48.77 m (160 ft 0 in)
- Beam: 7.92 m (26 ft 0 in)
- Draught: 4.87 m (16 ft 0 in)
- Propulsion: Two Compound Uniflow Lentz valve motors. Originally with 2 x boiler super-heaters
- Speed: 9 knots (17 km/h; 10 mph) maximum

SAS Skilpad was a minelayer vessel of the South African Navy during and after the Second World War. She was launched as the German trawler Polaris and after being captured by the Allies in 1940, she was commissioned into the Royal Navy as a war prize and renamed HMS Spindrift. During the course of the war she was transferred to the South African Naval Forces, being based in Saldanha Bay and later at Durban. After being laid up for several years after the end of the war, she sank at her moorings in Durban during a gale in 1953, leading to her being decommissioned and sold for scrap in 1957.

== History ==
Polaris was built in the Germany in 1936 as a general purpose commercial trawler and was requisitioned by the Kriegsmarine in 1939 and converted into a lookout trawler. She was then fitted with concealed torpedo tubes and the Kriegsmarine added superheaters to the boilers to improve speed for short "sprints" as may be needed. She was intended to put to sea with general trawlers in the hope of attacking any Allied shipping that came within torpedo range. She was captured by HMS Arrow off Norway on 26 April 1940 and escorted back to Scapa Flow as a war prize by HMS Griffin.

As a war prize, Polaris was taken over by the Royal Navy and commissioned as HMS Spindrift and was initially used for submarine crew training at Portland but was later converted to a controlled minelayer, emerging from the dockyards in January 1942. She was transferred to Saldanha Bay on the Cape West Coast under command of the Royal Navy South Atlantic station in Simon's Town, being responsible for laying controlled minefield defences in the South African coastal waters.

HMS Spindrift was fully handed over to the SA Naval Forces on 5 July 1943 at Simon's Town and was renamed HMSAS Spindrift, now crewed by the South African Naval Forces. At the end of the war, she remained in Saldanha Bay until 1948 when she was towed to Durban by the frigate HMSAS Transvaal and was laid up in care and maintenance at Salisbury Island as part of the reserve fleet. In 1951 she was renamed HMSAS Skilpad (the name Skilpad translates to Tortoise and was an apt reflection of her (lack of) speed - without the super heaters which had been removed whilst in the Royal Navy; top speed was 9 knots!).

== Fate ==
Skilpad sank at her berth at Salisbury Island on 22 July 1953 during a northeastely gale. Although considerable efforts were made to raise her, the ship never went back to sea again and was eventually sold for scrap in May 1957 and broken up at Durban.

== Notes and references ==
=== Bibliography ===
- Du Toit, Allan (1992). South Africa's Fighting Ships: Past and Present. Rivonia, South Africa: Ashanti Publishing. ISBN 1-874800-50-2.
- Preston, Antony (1989) [1946]. Janes Fighting Ships of World War II. Random House. ISBN 1-85170-494-9.
- Turner, L.C.F. (1961). War in the Southern Oceans: 1939-45. Cape Town: Oxford University Press.
