= Africanae =

Africanae may refer to:

- Primitiae Africanae, a botanical book series by Hendrik de Wit

== See also ==
- List of Latin and Greek words commonly used in systematic names#africanum
