= RFA Salvestor =

King Salvor class salvage vessel of the Royal Fleet Auxiliary

History

United Kingdom
- Name: RFA Salvestor
- Ordered: 10 January 1941
- Builder: Wm. Simons & Co. Ltd., Renfrew
- Yard number: 753
- Laid down: 20 September 1941, as Assistance
- Launched: 28 August 1942, as Salvestor
- Completed: 30 September 1942
- Decommissioned: September 1959
- Fate: Sold for scrapping, July 1970

General characteristics
- Class & type: King Salvor-class salvage vessel
- Displacement: 1,780 long tons (1,809 t) full load
- Length: 216 ft 11 in (66.12 m)
- Beam: 37 ft 11 in (11.56 m)
- Draught: 15 ft 7 in (4.75 m)
- Propulsion: 2 × 3-cylinder triple expansion steam engines, two shafts
- Speed: 12 knots (22 km/h; 14 mph)
- Complement: Between 52 and 72
- Armament: 4 × 20 mm AA guns (4×1)

RFA Salvestor (A499) was a King Salvor-class salvage vessel of the post war Royal Fleet Auxiliary.

Salvestor was built by Wm. Simons & Co. Ltd. of Renfrew, Scotland. Laid down on 20 September 1941 as Assistance, and launched on 28 August 1942 as HMS Salvestor. The ship was decommissioned in September 1959, laid up at Pembroke Dock, and sold for breaking up to Thos. W. Ward at Briton Ferry in July 1970.

== Service history ==
During the Second World War the Salvestor was one of two Royal Navy ships manned by South African Naval personnel (SANF). She remained the property of the Royal Navy, but was under SANF control from 31 August 1944. She served in the Mediterranean and then participated in the war against Japan with the British Eastern Fleet.

In 1945 Salvestor assisted a merchant ship that had encountered problems more than 200 km from Milne Bay, New Guinea. After the war Salvestor salvaged a number of wrecks from Hong Kong Harbour, including a Japanese tug. The SANF crew was gradually replaced by Royal Navy personnel, she was handed back to the Royal Navy in 1946.

For services rendered in the war against Japan, the Salvestor received the "Pacific 1942-45" battle honour, the only South African-manned naval vessel to be honoured in this way.
