= HMSAS Africana =

1930 naval trawler

History

South Africa
- Name: Africana
- Owner: South African Department of Sea Fisheries
- Builder: Hall Russell Aberdeen
- Launched: 1930
- Christened: Africana
- Out of service: 1939
- Home port: Cape Town

South African Navy
- Name: HMSAS Africana
- Owner: South African Seaward Defence Force
- Commissioned: 10 September 1939
- Decommissioned: 10 April 1947. Returned to Department of Sea Fisheries
- Home port: Simon's Town
- Identification: T01 (to 1944) and T501 (1944–1947)
- Honours and awards: South African Waters 1939–1945 (Note: For operations within a radius of 1000 nautical miles of the South African Coast, including South West Africa.)

General characteristics
- Type: Minesweeping trawler
- Displacement: 313 tons standard
- Length: 38.4 m (126 ft 0 in)
- Beam: 7.65 m (25 ft 1 in)
- Draught: 3.84 m (12 ft 7 in)
- Propulsion: One coal-fired 3-cylinder triple-expansion reciprocating engine
- Speed: 11 knots (20 km/h; 13 mph) maximum

HMSAS Africana (Note: HMSAS stands for "His (or Her) Majesty's South African Ship") was a minesweeping trawler of the South African Seaward Defence Force during the Second World War. She was originally a sea fisheries research vessel and was later fitted for mine-sweeping and survey duties in the early 1930s. She was retained for survey duties off the South African coast throughout the war and in October 1942 she was involved in the rescue of survivors from the American cargo vessel Anne Hutchinson after she was torpedoed by U-504 off East London. In addition to survey, she was used extensively for search and rescue operations in the latter part of the war and her final rescue operation was rescuing 49 survivors of the Canadian SS Point Pleasant Park (Note: This was last vessel to be sunk in South African waters during the Second World War) which was torpedoed by U-510 on 23 February 1945 off the coast of Luderitz Bay.

After the war, Africana was returned to the South African Department of Sea Fisheries and was re-fitted as a fishery survey vessel, starting her first post-war survey in May 1947. She remained in service in this role until 1950 when she was replaced by the new survey vessel Africana II. She was sold to Benjamin Gelcer who used her as a fishing trawler. She later joined the fishing fleet of Irwin and Johnson and was used until 1965 when she was finally withdrawn from fishing service and broken up in Table Bay and sold as scrap.

== Bibliography ==
- Du Toit, Allan (1992). South Africa's Fighting Ships: Past and Present. Ashanti. ISBN 1-874800-50-2.
- Harris, C.J. (Capt. SAN) (1991). War at Sea: South African Maritime Operations during World War II. Ashanti. ISBN 1-874800-16-2.
