= Outeniqua =

Outeniqua may refer to:

- Outeniqua Mountains, a mountain range in South Africa
- Outeniqua Pass, a mountain pass in the Western Cape, South Africa
- Outeniqua Park, a stadium in George, South Africa
- SAS Outeniqua, a sealift and replenishment ship of the South African Navy
- 1396 Outeniqua, an asteroid of the Main Belt
- Outeniqua (beetle), a genus of beetles
