= Zimasa Mabela =

South African Navy officer

Lt-Cdr Zimasa Mabela (born 1976 or 1977 (age 48–49)) is a South African Navy officer who became the first black female appointed commander of a naval vessel. She took command of the SAS Umhloti on 26 August 2015, succeeding Commander Brian Shor. The Change of Command ceremony took place at Delta berth, SA Navy Dockyard, in Simon's Town, South Africa. A mother of two, she was named one of the BBC's 100 Women in 2015.

== Early life ==
Zimasa Mabela grew up in the village of Lady Frere, mid-Eastern Cape and did not see the ocean until she was 18 years old. She joined the navy in 1999 and did not complete her BSc in education.
