= Outeniqua hobohmi =

Scientific classification
- Kingdom: Animalia
- Phylum: Arthropoda
- Class: Insecta
- Order: Coleoptera
- Suborder: Polyphaga
- Infraorder: Scarabaeiformia
- Family: Scarabaeidae
- Genus: Outeniqua
- Species: O. hobohmi

Binomial name
- Outeniqua hobohmi Schein, 1956

Species of beetle

Outeniqua hobohmi is a species of beetle of the family Scarabaeidae. It is found in Namibia.

== Description ==
Adults reach a length of about 7–8 mm (0.28–0.31 in). They are similar to Outeniqua festiva, but has a longer, more laterally curved pronotum and the elytra have a black ground colour. The scales are yellowish-white, and do not have a green-opalescent sheen.
