= SAS Saldanha =

SAS Saldanha Navy Military Base
- Part of South African Navy
- Saldanha, Western Cape

Site information
- Type: Training base
- Owner: SA NAVY
- Open to the public: No

Location
- Location within Western Cape
- Coordinates: 33.0205°S 18.0035°E

Site history
- Built: 1941

Garrison information
- Current commander: Captain (SAN) Madonsela

SAS Saldanha is a South African Navy training base in Saldanha Bay.

== History ==
In 1941, as a result of increased pressure on Table Bay, a new Allied harbour was sought. Saldanha Bay, with its sheltered moorings, was the ideal location.

The South African Seaward Defence Force and a minesweeping flotilla were established in 1942 for seaward and harbour protection. On Baviaanskop, Elands Bay, Malgaskop and Hoedjiespunt, 6-inch and 12-inch guns were installed. Anti-submarine nets were laid in North Bay, and eight lines of moored mines and a control centre on land protected the entrance of Saldanha Bay. Members of the South African Women's Auxiliary Naval Services, previously known as SWANS, operated the controls and detection equipment.

All the British living quarters became the property of the SA Navy on 14 June 1944. In 1948 the training establishment HMSAS Field Marshal Smuts moved from Saldanha to Salisbury Island in Durban. However, the base at Saldanha soon reverted to a training base in 1951 when the Naval Gymnasium was set up with 44 trainees reporting for a year's training.

Before the unit was christened SAS Saldanha on 1 March 1956, it was known as the "Naval and Marine Gymnasium" and "SAS Drommedaris." With the implementation of 12 months compulsory National Service, SAS Saldanha started training recruits from both the National Service and the Permanent Force.

In May 1989 SAS Saldanha became a naval base with the added responsibility to still function as a unit. This was maintained until 1990 when, due to rationalisation, it reverted to a pure training unit.

== Training Courses ==
The training that currently takes place at SAS Saldanha are the courses listed below, trainees also do Seamanship training at the JETTY, where they are thought swimming, rafting, and survival tactics.

- Military Skills Development (MSD) Training
- Military Training for Rating Part 1(MTR 1) - a promotion from being a Seaman to a Able Seaman
- Military Training for Ratings Part 2 (MTR 2)- a requirement for Leading seamen to become a Petty Officer
- Military Training for Ratings Part 3 (MTR 3) - needed for promotion to Warrant Officer.
- NARYSEC - SA Navy also trains NARYSEC participants who are on the Youth Leadership Development Programme (YLDP), who are recruited by Department of Agriculture, Land Reform and Rural Development. In the year 2023, SAS Saldanha welcomes the 3 intake, which consists of 734 youth from across South Africa. These youth people receive leadership training through the military approach of training which is phase 2 of the programme. West Coast College and Boland College with other stakeholders play a theoretical role in developing the youth at SAS Saldanha.

== See also ==
- South African Military Academy
