= SAS Tafelberg =

History

Denmark
- Name: MT Annam
- Builder: Nakskov Skibsværft, Nakskov, Denmark
- Yard number: 150
- Launched: 20 June 1958
- Home port: Copenhagen
- Fate: Sold to Safmarine in 1965

South Africa
- Renamed: SAS Tafelberg (1965)
- Namesake: Table Mountain
- Operator: South African Navy
- Commissioned: 19 August 1967
- Decommissioned: 1993
- Reclassified: Replenishment ship (1967); Assault ship (1984)
- Home port: Simonstown
- Identification: A23
- Nickname(s): 'Mama Tafies' or 'Tafies'
- Fate: Scrapped in 1993

General characteristics
- Displacement: 18,980 tons
- Length: 170.5 m (559 ft 5 in)
- Beam: 21.9 m (71 ft 10 in)
- Draught: 8.3 m (27 ft 3 in)
- Propulsion: 10,000 hp (7,500 kW) 8-cylinder turbo-charged diesel
- Speed: 16 knots (30 km/h; 18 mph)
- Boats & landing craft carried: 6 Delta fast assault craft
- Complement: 9 officers and 118 ratings
- Armament: 4 × Oerlikon 20 mm cannons; 6 × 12,7 mm guns; 2 x 40/60 bofors guns
- Aircraft carried: 2 × Atlas Oryx helicopters

SAS Tafelberg was a replenishment ship (AOR) of the South African Navy. The ship started life as the Danish tanker Annam before undergoing various conversions into her final configuration.

== Early history ==
SAS Tafelberg started life in 1958 as the Danish tanker Annam in the service of the East Asiatic Company in Copenhagen. She was one of four similar ships commissioned at the time, and was named by the local Thai ambassador's daughter Vasna Virajakar. BP Shipping leased her for five years.

== South African Navy ==
She was purchased in 1965 by Safmarine before being reconfigured in Durban as the replenishment ship SAS Tafelberg and sold to the South African Navy (SAN). At this time, she had five refuelling points, one astern and two solid stores transfer stations.

In 1967, in the company of SAS President Kruger and SAS President Pretorius, she visited Argentina, while in 1968 she visited Australia along with SAS President Steyn and President Pretorius.

In 1971 Tafelberg acted as official guardship for the Cape-to-Rio yacht race. Because of apartheid South Africa's political isolation at the time, the ship could not enter Rio de Janeiro and instead travelled up the River Plate to Buenos Aires.

In November 1975 at the end of Operation Savannah, she provided logistical support to President Kruger and President Steyn during the Ambrizete Incident, and also subsequently went to Zaire to retrieve the guns that the army left behind in Angola.

In 1980, Tafelberg had a small flight deck that was fitted to the stern of the ship behind the funnel deck for use of the Wasp helicopter, but had no hangar or refueling points and was used solely for transporting persons from Tafelberg to the frigates and vice versa

Tafelberg was involved in a collision in the South Atlantic with the frigate SAS President Kruger on 18 February 1982, during which President Kruger sank with the loss of 16 lives.

In 1983–1984, Tafelberg underwent significant changes. The rear refuelling points were removed and an additional landing deck with two hangars was fitted aft. The vessel was configured to carry two Puma or Atlas Oryx helicopters, although the larger Super Frelon helicopter was also used until they were removed from service. Helicopter operations were particularly risky, for these helicopters, not being designed for marine use, were unable to apply negative pitch to their main rotors, therefore making them vulnerable to rolling off the flight deck in heavy seas.

The 1983 changes also included accommodation and messing facilities for 300 marines under the flight deck, a hospital and davits for six Delta fast landing craft. Each of these craft was able to carry and put ashore a short wheel-base Land Rover and an infantry section with all equipment.

In 1987, she went to Mauritius along with the Warrior-class strike craft SAS Jim Fouche to assist in the recovery of debris and bodies following the crash of the Helderberg Boeing 747.

She participated in numerous exercises and operations during her lifespan, earning her the affectionate nickname "Mama Tafies" (Afrikaans for "Mother Tafies") on her maiden voyage from Durban to Simonstown.

SAS Tafelberg was sold for scrap in 1993. SAS Outeniqua, and later SAS Drakensberg, took over her role in the fleet.
