= Operational Diving Division (SA Navy) =

Diving component of the South African Navy's Maritime Reaction Squadron

The Operational Diving Division is part of the South African Navy's Maritime Reaction Squadron (MRS) that was formed as the Naval Rapid Deployment Force (NRDF) in 2006.

The Division consists of the training wing and the operational wing of four operational diving teams of 17 divers. These teams of combat divers are trained in mine-countermeasures, search and recovery and underwater explosives as a war time role. During peace time they are tasked also with assisting dry docking, underwater welding/cutting/repairs, and their continual role in assisting arms of service from other nations (Lesotho, Tanzania) and in crime fighting in collaboration with the police.

== Training ==
Training is conducted at the Diving school at SAS Simonsberg, which was established on 1 April 1957 after the signing of the Simonstown Agreement.
