= T Craft-class patrol vessel =

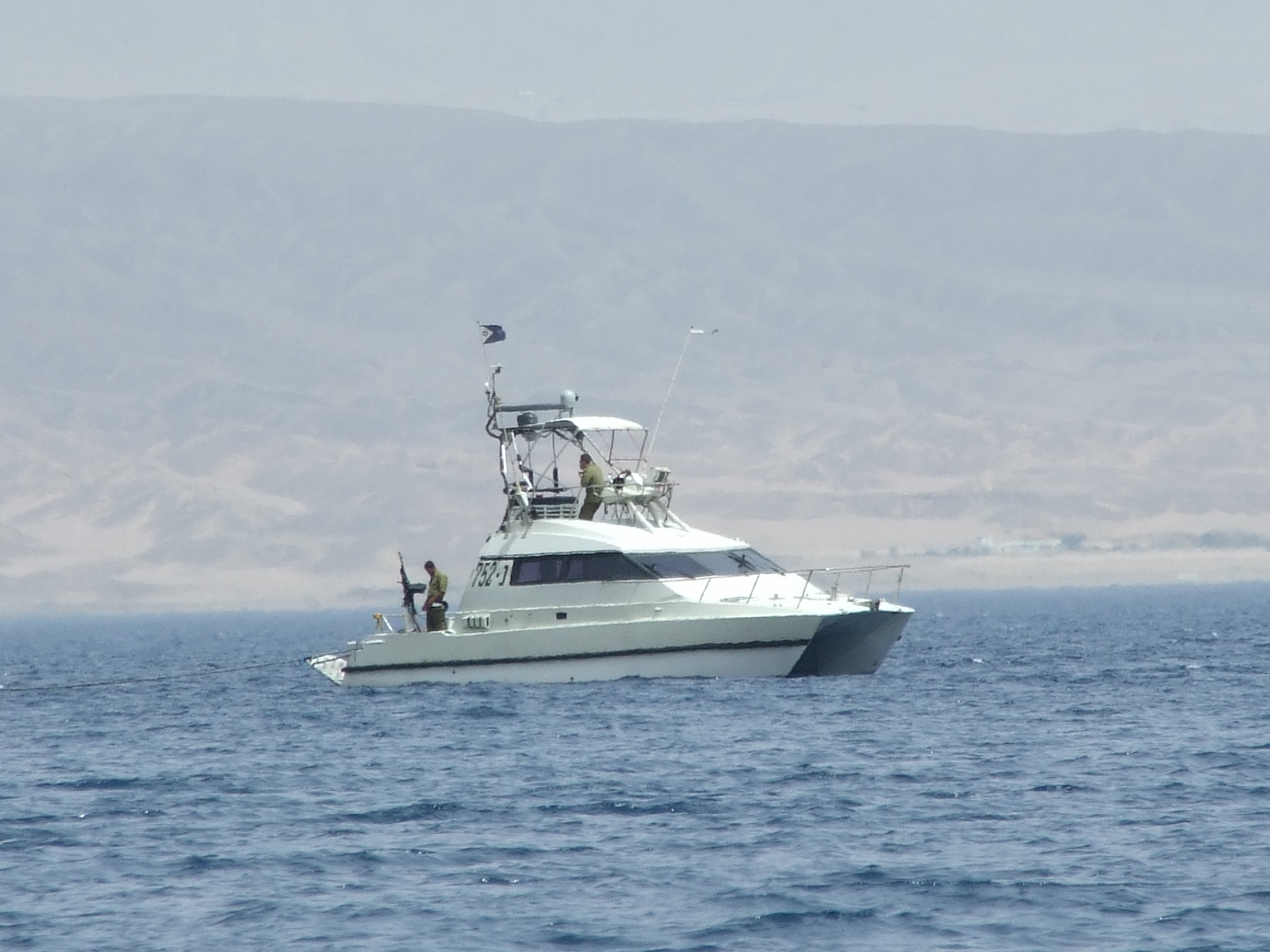
- T-class inshore patrol vessel

Class overview
- Name: T Craft class
- Operators: South African Navy (3); Israeli Navy (3)
- Completed: 6
- Active: 6

General characteristics
- Class & type: Patrol boat
- Displacement: 36 long tons (37 t)
- Length: 22 m (72.2 ft)
- Beam: 7 m (23.0 ft)
- Draught: 0.9 m (3.0 ft)
- Installed power: 2,000 hp (1,500 kW)
- Propulsion: 2 ADE 444 Tl 12V diesels; 2 Hamilton water-jets
- Speed: 32 knots (59 km/h; 37 mph)
- Range: 530 nmi (980 km; 610 mi) at 22 kn (41 km/h; 25 mph)
- Capacity: 16 (1 officer)
- Sensors & processing systems: Surface search radar : Racal-Decca I-band
- Armament: 1 × 12.7 mm (0.50 in) Browning machine gun

The T Craft-class patrol vessels are a class of inshore patrol boat currently in service with the South African Navy. Comprising three vessels, the class was constructed in South Africa and entered service in 1992. Known just as T craft or by their pennant numbers until 2003 when the vessels received new names.

== Design ==
These boats are twin-hulled catamarans of glass-reinforced plastic (GRP) sandwich construction, with a complement of 16 personnel including one officer. The displace 36 long tons (37 t) fully loaded and are 22 metres (72 ft 2 in) long overall with a beam of 7 metres (23 ft 0 in) and a draught of 0.9 metres (2 ft 11 in). The boats are propelled by two Hamilton water-jets powered by two ADE 444 Tl 12V diesel engines creating 2,000 horsepower (1,500 kW). This gives the vessels a maximum speed of 32 knots (59 km/h) and a range of 530 nautical miles (980 km) at 22 knots (41 km/h). Each vessel possesses a Racal-Decca I-band surface search radar unit and a single 12.7 mm (0.50 in) heavy Browning machine gun. Each boat is designed to carry a small seaborne complement of commandos as well as a rigid-hulled inflatable boat in the stern well in order to board other vessels at sea.

== History ==
Three vessels were ordered in mid-1991, and were built by T Craft International in Cape Town. The first vessel was commissioned into the South African Navy as P1552 in June 1992. The second vessel was commissioned as P1553 in June 1996 and the third as P1554 in December 1996. Three vessels of this type were also built for Israel in 1997. In 2003, the three vessels were given new names, keeping their old names as pennant numbers. P1152 became SAS Tobie (P1552), P1553 became SAS Tern (P1553) and P1554 became SAS Tekwane (P1554).
