= Maritime Reaction Squadron =

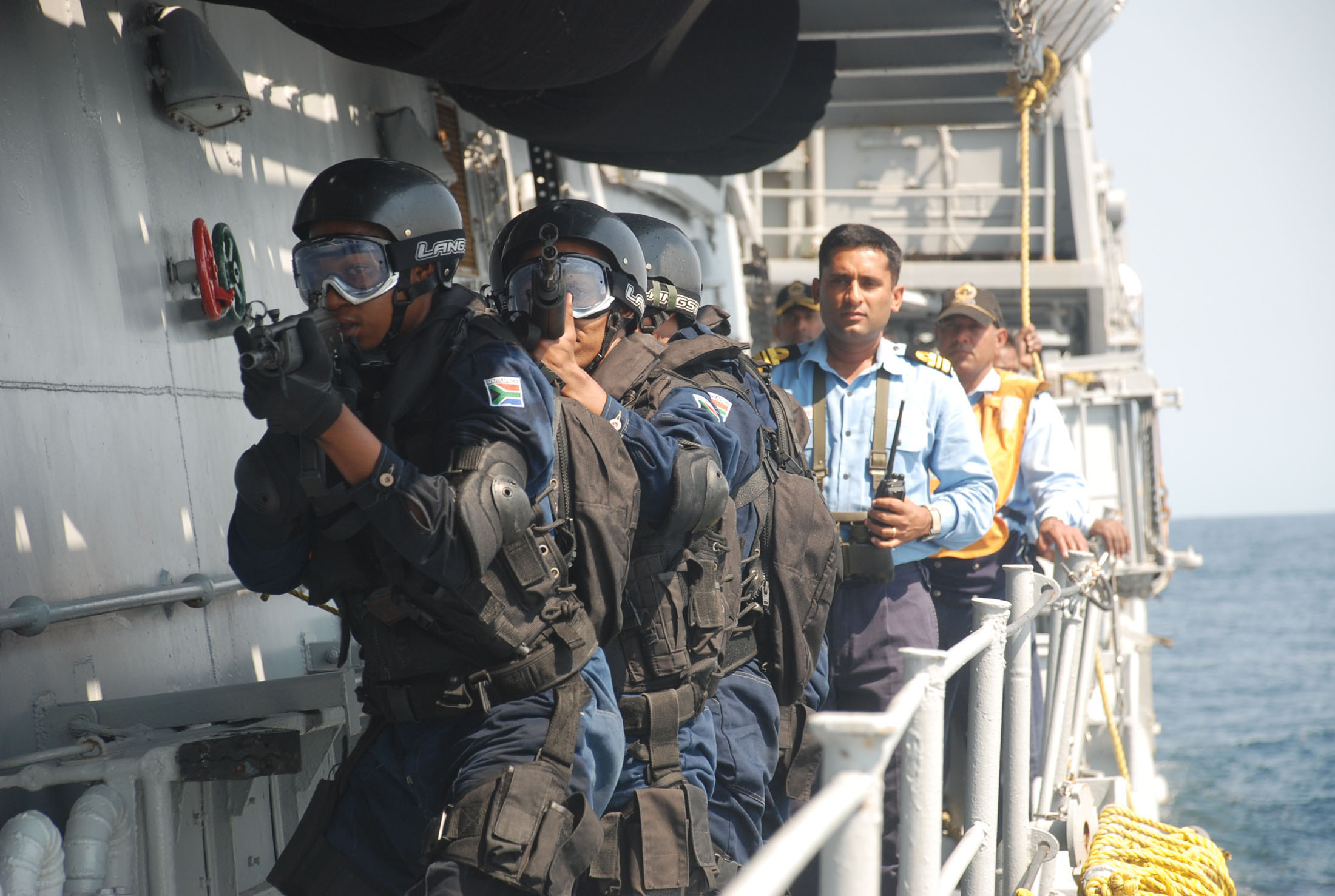
- South African marines during an exercise aboard an Indian Navy ship
- Founded: 2006; 19 years ago
- Country: South Africa
- Branch: South African Navy
- Type: Marine infantry
- Role: Combat Diving
- Size: Battalion
- Part of: South African National Defence Force

The Maritime Reaction Squadron (MRS) is a specialised marine-like unit of the South African Navy that provides a combat ready amphibious, diving and small boat capability to the Navy.

Formed as the Naval Rapid Deployment Force (NRDF) in 2005, the MRS deploys infantry-trained South African Navy personnel in various peacekeeping roles within the African continent and to assist in boarding operations at sea, humanitarian operations and disaster relief.

== History ==
The end of the South African Border War saw the disbandment of the South Africa Marine Corps, leaving the South African Navy without an amphibious element. After the integration of the South African National Defence Force the Navy was increasingly called on to assist with peace keeping operations. Realising that this situation would continue, the then Chief of the Navy Refiloe Johannes Mudimu, decided to create this capability by creating a Naval Rapid Deployment Force. An Operational Boat Squadron was formed in 2006 to ensure that South Africa could commit meaningfully to the peace keeping at the Great Lakes.

The Rapid Deployment Force became the Maritime Reaction Squadron on 1 September 2006. The unit was formally commissioned on 8 December 2008. Following the creating of the MRS the Operational Boat Squadron was upgraded to the Operational Boat Division.

== Units ==
The squadron consists of the following components:

- Operational Boat Division (OBD) with 10 Namacurra-class harbour patrol boats and six Lima-class utility landing craft
- Reaction Force Division (RFD) consisting of one naval infantry company with a command and support element
- Operational Diving Division (ODD) consisting of four operational diving teams of 17 divers.
- Operational Maintenance Division - maintains all the unit equipment
