= River-class mine hunter =

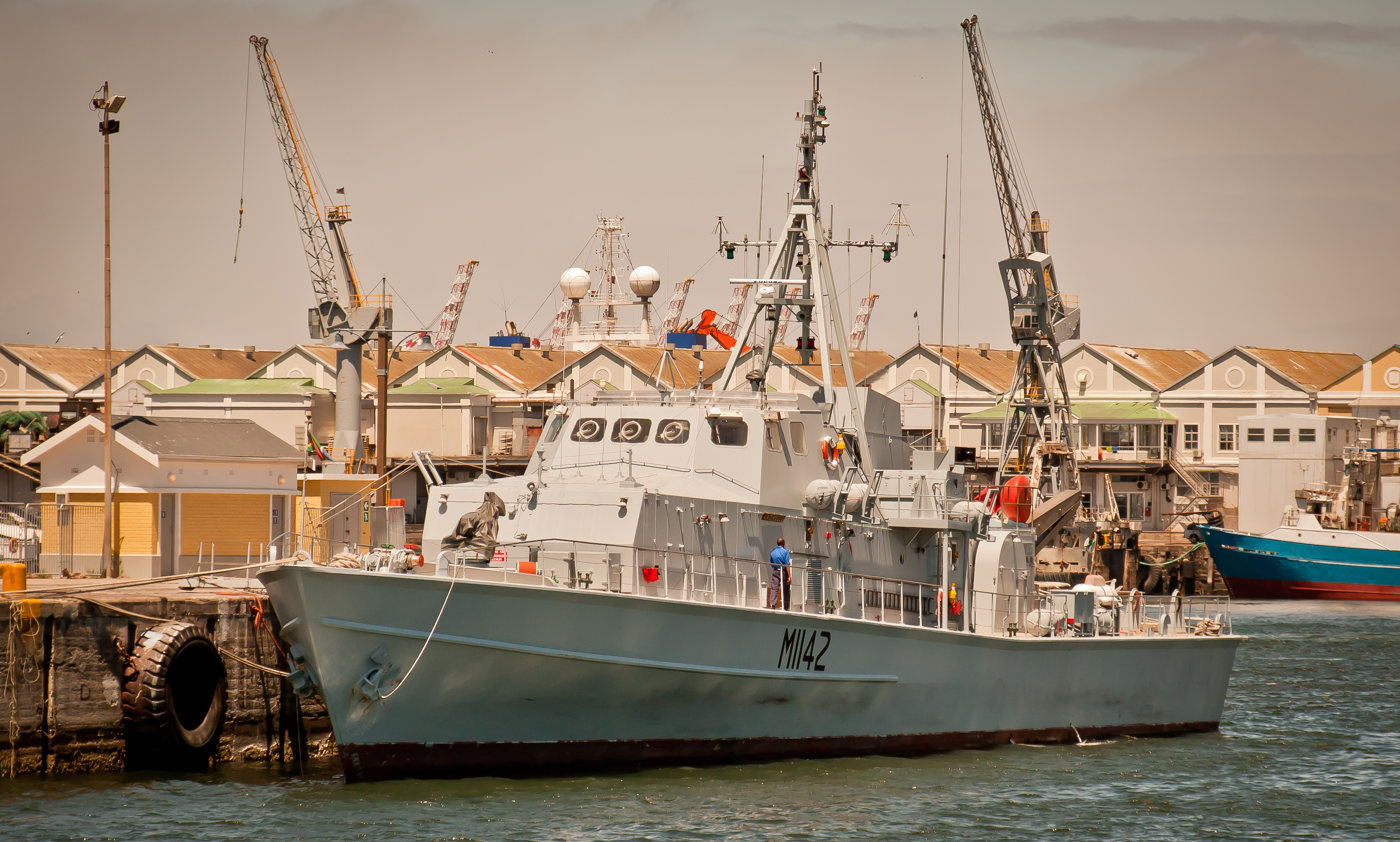
- SAS Umzimkulu

Class overview
- Name: River class
- Builders: Abeking & Rasmussen and Sandock-Austral
- Operators: South African Navy
- Preceded by: Ton-class minesweeper
- Built: 4
- Completed: 4
- Active: 4

General characteristics
- Type: Minehunter
- Displacement: 390 t (380 long tons)
- Length: 48.0 m (157.5 ft)
- Beam: 8.5 m (27.9 ft)
- Draught: 2.5 m (8.2 ft)
- Propulsion: 2 × MTU 12V TB81 diesels, 2 shaft; 3,367 kW (4,515 hp)
- Speed: 16 kn (30 km/h; 18 mph)
- Range: 2,000 nmi (3,700 km; 2,300 mi) at 13 kn (24 km/h; 15 mph)
- Complement: 40
- Armament: 1 × Oerlikon 20 mm cannon; 2 × 12.7 mm machine guns

The River class is a class of four minehunters built for the South African Navy. They have a secondary role as inshore patrol vessels.

== Development ==
In order to circumvent United Nations military sanctions during the apartheid-era, the minehunters were originally ordered and operated by the Department of Transport and designated as research vessels. The initial names of the vessels were Navors (Afrikaans for 'research'), and numbered 1 to 4.

Ordered in 1978, the first vessel, Navors I, was shipped to Durban from Germany in June 1980 for fitting out, shortly followed by the Navors II. The second pair were constructed in Durban. The vessels were painted blue with white upper works and formed the First Research Squadron.

In 1982, the four vessels were renamed after South African rivers but continued to fly the national flag rather than the naval ensign.

Only in February 1988 was the prefix RV changed to SAS when they were formally accepted as naval ships.

== Current status ==
As of 2022, two River-class vessels are still in service with the South African Navy, however, they are believed to have lost their mine-hunting capabilities due to the retirement of the antiquated PAP104 autonomous underwater vehicles (AUVs).

Whilst still maintaining a decompression chamber for operational diving, the River class are now deployed on general coastal defence duties, and are equipped with a single Oerlikon 20 mm cannon, two 12.7 mm machine guns, and a RHIB for boarding operations.

Name	Previous Names	Pennant	Commissioned	Notes
SAS Umkomaas	RV Navors I	M1499	13 January 1981	Named after the Umkomaas River
SAS Umgeni	RV Navors II	M1213	1 March 1981	Named after Umgeni River
SAS Umzimkulu	RV Navors III	M1142	30 October 1981	Named after Umzimkulu River
SAS Umhloti	RV Navors IV	M1212	15 December 1981	Named after Umhloti River close to Durban, South Africa

== See also ==
- List of decommissioned ships of the South African Navy
- List of ships of the South African Navy
