= SAS Outeniqua =

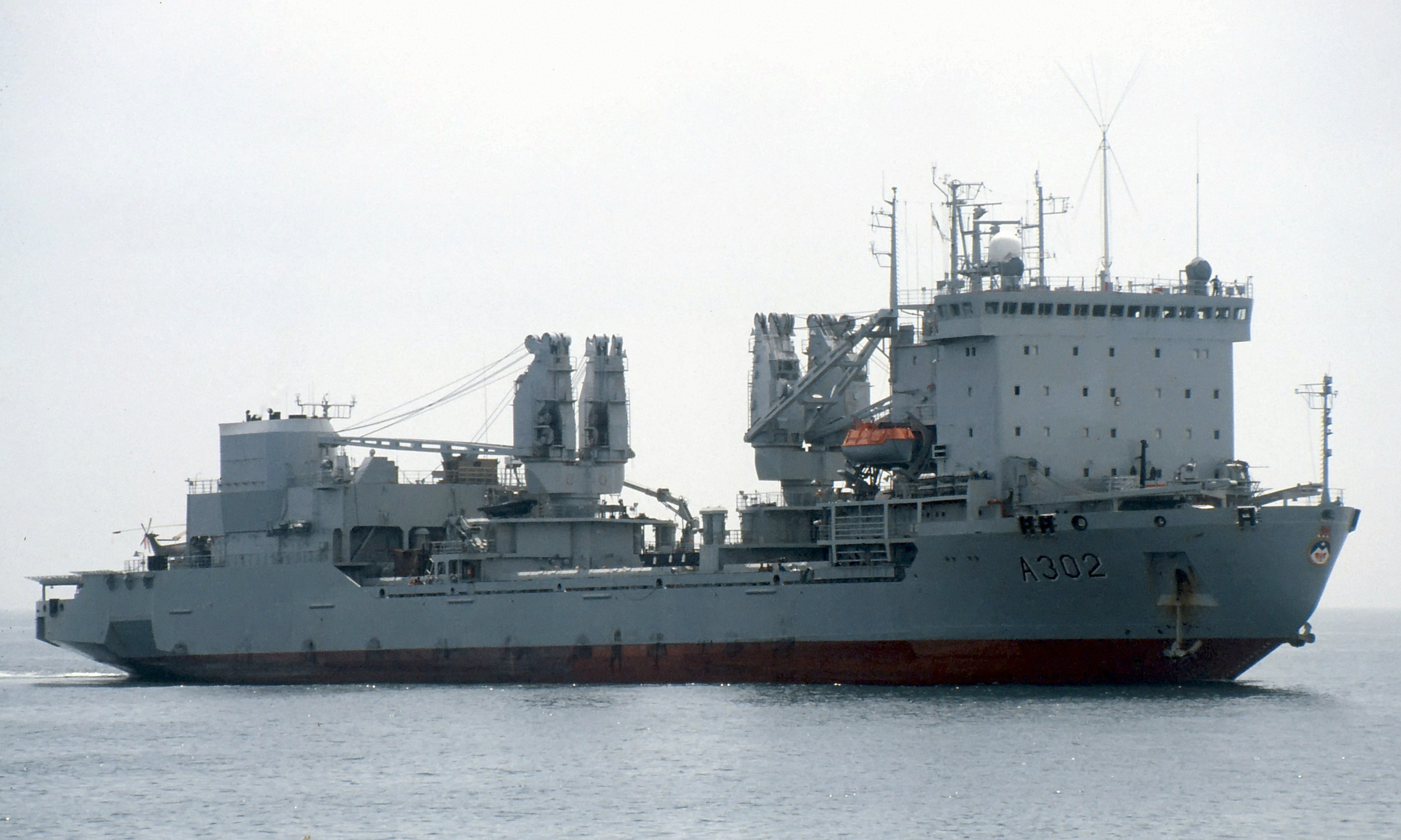
- SAS Outeniqua in 1994

History

South Africa
- Name: Aleksandr Sledzyuk (1991–1992); Yuvent (1991–1992); SAS Outeniqua (1993–2005); Paarderberg (2005-2007); Ice Maiden I (2007-2013)
- Namesake: Outeniqua Mountains
- Operator: South African Navy (1993–2004)
- Builder: Kherson Shipyard, Ukraine
- Yard number: 6002
- Launched: 6 September 1991
- Commissioned: 8 June 1993
- Decommissioned: 30 July 2004
- Identification: IMO number: 9056894
- Fate: Broken up 2013

General characteristics
- Displacement: 21,025 tons full load
- Length: 166.3 metres (546 ft)
- Beam: 22.6 metres (74 ft)
- Installed power: 13,200 kW (17,700 bhp)
- Propulsion: 1 × MAN Burmeister & Wain 8DKRN-60/195 diesel, 1 × propeller
- Speed: 17 knots (31 km/h; 20 mph)
- Range: 8,000 nautical miles (15,000 km) at 15 knots (28 km/h)
- Capacity: 4 × Delta 80 Landing Craft Utility; 10 × vehicles
- Troops: Up to 600
- Crew: 126, including aircrew
- Sensors & processing systems: 2 × Racal I-band radars
- Armament: Fitted for 2 × Oerlikon 20 mm cannon and 6 × 12.7mm machine guns
- Aircraft carried: 2 × Atlas Oryx helicopters
- Notes: Data from

SAS Outeniqua (A 302) was a sealift and replenishment ship operated by the South African Navy between 1993 and 2004. During her operational career she conducted several "flag-showing" cruises to African ports and provided support for South Africa's Antarctic research program. Outeniqua was also the venue for unsuccessful peace talks between Zaire's President Mobuto Sese Seko and rebel leader Laurent Kabila in May 1997.

== Construction and acquisition ==
The ship was constructed at the Kherson Shipyard in Ukraine as the second Arctic supply vessel of Project 10621, and launched as Aleksandr Sledzyuk (Russian: Александр Следзюк) on 6 September 1991. Aleksandr Sledzyuk's displacement was 21,025 tons full load, with dimensions 166.3 metres (546 ft) length overall and 22.6 metres (74 ft) beam. She was powered by a single MAN B&W 8DKRN-60/195 diesel producing 13,200 kW (17,700 bhp). She was designed to be capable of breaking through 1 metre (3.3 ft) of ice while travelling at a speed of 2 knots (3.7 km/h). Aleksandr Sledzyuk entered service on 3 April 1992, and was renamed Yuvent (Russian: Ювент) the next day after being delivered to shipping company Aqua Limited of Kaliningrad.

On 26 February 1993 Yuvent was purchased by Armscor for R40 million on behalf of the South African Navy to replace the SAS Tafelberg. She was commissioned into the Navy as SAS Outeniqua on 8 June 1993. In South African service the ship was primarily used to transport vehicles and other heavy equipment. Her secondary roles included acting as a replenishment tanker, supporting South Africa's Antarctic research program, providing search and rescue capabilities and responding to natural disasters. In 1997 Outeniqua was reported to be the South African Navy's largest ship.

== Operational career ==
After entering service, Outeniqua undertook a "flag-showing" cruise to Durban, Majunga in Madagascar, Moroni in the Comoros, and Victoria in Seychelles between 18 June and 15 July 1993. On 11 August 1993 she sailed from her home port of Simon's Town, and undertook a voyage in which she delivered agricultural implements to Mombasa in Kenya and a mobile hospital to Trieste in Italy. She also visited various ports in the Black Sea and eastern Mediterranean before returning to Simon's Town on 22 October. During September and October 1994 Outeniqua delivered food supplies bound for Rwandan refugees to Dar es Salaam in Tanzania; this made her the first South African warship to visit the country since 1952. During 1994 Outeniqua also underwent a refit in which her flight deck and hangar were modified to allow the ship to operate two Atlas Oryx helicopters, and she was fitted with replenishment at sea equipment and an armament comprising small calibre cannons and heavy machine guns.

In mid-February 1995 Outeniqua provided support for a gathering of 1,200 former political prisoners at Robben Island. In July that year she formed part of a South African task force of three warships and a submarine which visited Maputo in Mozambique and Dar es Salaam; during this voyage Outeniqua hosted a banquet for diplomats and senior Mozambican military officers. She underwent a refit from May to September 1996.

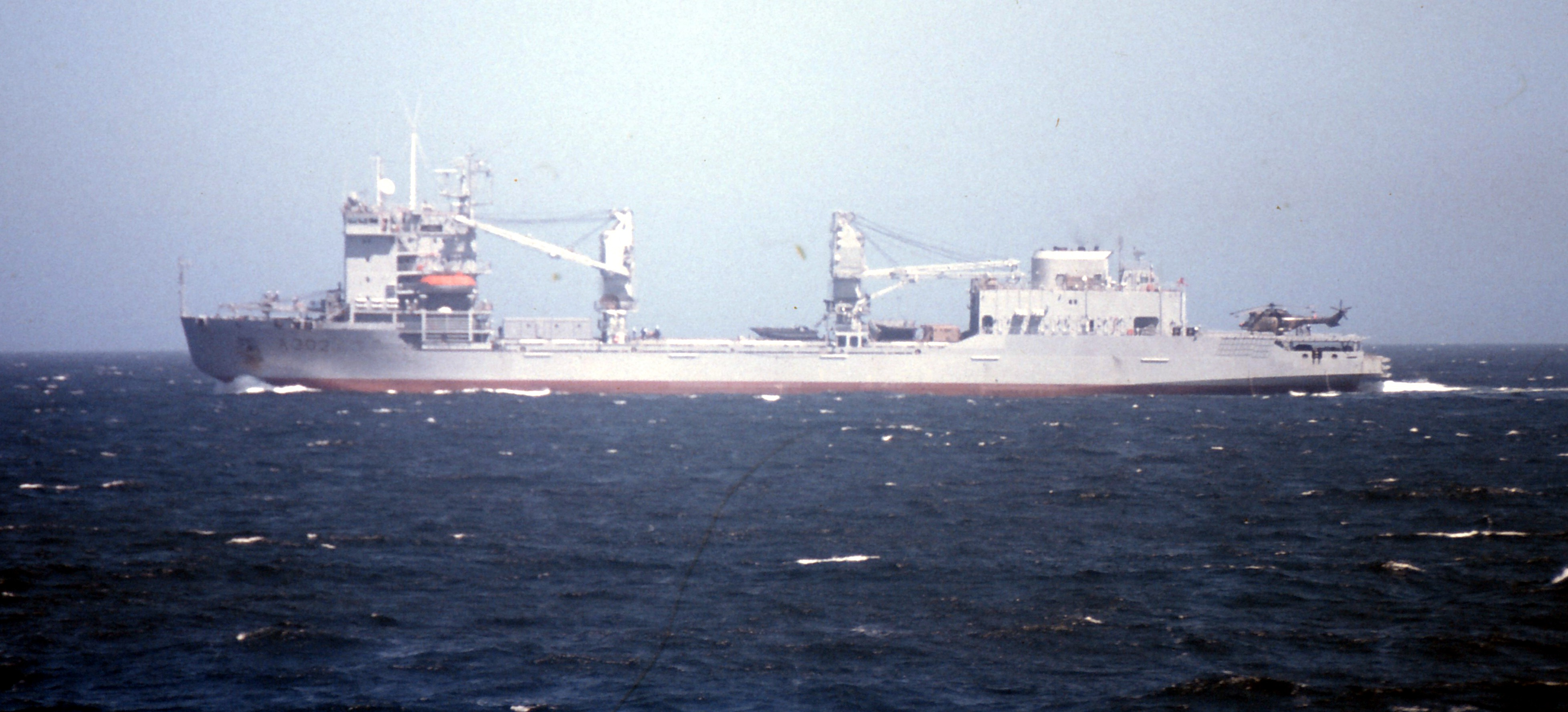
Outeniqua in 1994 with a helicopter embarked

Outeniqua spent much of May 1997 at Pointe Noire in the Republic of the Congo to serve as a venue for peace talks between Zaire's President Mobuto Sese Seko and rebel leader Laurent Kabila chaired by South African President Nelson Mandela, with the intention of ending the First Congo War. While talks were held on board the ship on 4 May, Kabila withdrew from a second meeting which was planned for 14 May and little came of the discussions. Between May and September 1997 she received another refit.

In late 1997 and early 1998 Outeniqua conducted two voyages to resupply a SANAE weather reporting team in Antarctica. The ship also visited two Swedish bases in Antarctica, as well as South Thule and Zavodovski Island during these missions. During August and September 1998 Outeniqua and two minesweepers conducted a flag-showing cruise up the east coast of Africa, and visited Maputo, Dar es Salaam and Zanzibar. A helicopter handling system was installed during 1998. During 2000 Outeniqua's flight deck and logistic support capabilities were upgraded.

In mid-June 2001 Outeniqua and the mine hunter SAS Umhloti sailed to Saint Helena where their crews restored the graves of South African prisoners of war who had died while being held on the island during the Second Boer War. During August 2001 Outeniqua sailed to Marion Island to rescue two seriously sick weathermen. During this voyage two teenage stowaways were found on board the ship. Both were citizens of Burundi, and were handed over to immigration authorities when the ship docked at Durban. Outeniqua departed Simon's Town on 10 September that year to participate in a naval review in Australia at the start of October, but this visit did not go ahead as the review was cancelled as a result of the September 11 attacks. Instead, she visited Réunion and exercised with the French Navy before returning to Simon's Town on 12 October.

Outeniqua took part in another cruise in January and February 2002 when she and the fast attack craft SAS Adam Kok visited Dar es Salaam, Tanga Bay and Zanzibar to conduct peace-keeping exercises. During this voyage Outeniqua embarked the patrol boat SAS Tobie and two Namacurra-class harbour patrol boats. In September 2002 it was reported that Outeniqua would be used to transport 200 elephants and a large number of other animals from Walvis Bay in Namibia to Luanda in Angola during June 2003. This voyage was to form part of a program called "Operation Noah's Ark" which aimed to repopulate Quiçama National Park following the conclusion of the Angolan Civil War. It is unclear if the voyage was conducted, however. Outeniqua conducted her second visit to Saint Helena during December 2002, and also docked in Namibia before returning to Simon's Town.

During June 2003 Outeniqua took part in a three-week-long naval exercise which involved eight warships, the submarine SAS Assegaai and South African Air Force aircraft. Also in 2003, the ship's crew repaired facilities at Gough Island.

In May 2004 it was reported that Outeniqua was soon to be decommissioned. The Navy stated that the ship was to be removed from service as she was becoming increasingly expensive to operate, and was not suitable for supporting the new Valour-class frigates as she was too slow and could not provide them with enough fuel. Outeniqua was subsequently decommissioned on 30 July 2004 and offered for sale. At this time, it was reported that she had spent only a third of her operational career at sea. The ship was eventually sold for R40 million.
