= Outeniqua festiva =

Scientific classification
- Kingdom: Animalia
- Phylum: Arthropoda
- Clade: Pancrustacea
- Class: Insecta
- Order: Coleoptera
- Suborder: Polyphaga
- Infraorder: Scarabaeiformia
- Family: Scarabaeidae
- Genus: Outeniqua
- Species: O. festiva

Binomial name
- Outeniqua festiva (Péringuey, 1885)

Synonyms
- Gymnoloma festiva Péringuey, 1885

Species of beetle

Outeniqua festiva is a species of beetle of the family Scarabaeidae. It is found in South Africa (Northern Cape, Gauteng, Limpopo, North West, Mpumalanga), Botswana, Eswatini, Mozambique, Namibia and Zimbabwe.

== Description ==
Adults reach a length of about 5.5–9 mm (0.22–0.35 in). Males are black, with the elytra flavescent or light testaceous yellow, and the hind legs occasionally red or reddish brown. The pronotum has a broad margin all round of bluish opaline scales and is clothed on the disk with flavescent, dense, short hairs. The scutellum is squamulose and the elytra have a very broad sutural band of bluish opaline ovate scales reaching from the base to the apex. The pygidial part and the underside are covered with dense, similar scales, which are also somewhat densely sprinkled on the intermediate and hind femora. In females, the discoidal part of the pronotum and of the elytra is sprinkled with numerous scales, not as closely set, however, as those on the marginal and juxta-sutural bands, and these scales have a more golden sheen than in males.

== Subspecies ==
- Outeniqua festiva festiva (Botswana, Eswatini, Mozambique, Namibia, Zimbabwe, South Africa: North West, Mpumalanga, Gauteng, Limpopo)
- Outeniqua festiva andreaei Schein, 1959 (South Africa: Northern Cape, Gauteng, Limpopo)
