= Outeniqua (beetle) =

Scientific classification
- Kingdom: Animalia
- Phylum: Arthropoda
- Class: Insecta
- Order: Coleoptera
- Suborder: Polyphaga
- Infraorder: Scarabaeiformia
- Family: Scarabaeidae
- Subfamily: Melolonthinae
- Tribe: Hopliini
- Genus: Outeniqua; Péringuey, 1902

Genus beetles

Outeniqua is a genus of beetles belonging to the family Scarabaeidae.

== Species ==
- Outeniqua centralis Schein, 1959
- Outeniqua festiva (Péringuey, 1885)
- Outeniqua hobohmi Schein, 1956
