= South African Navy =

Branch of the South African National Defence Force

- Afrikaans: Suid-Afrikaanse Vloot
- Founded: 1st April 1922; 104 years ago
- Country: South Africa
- Type: Navy
- Role: Naval warfare
- Size: 6,816 active personnel; 1,071 reserve personnel
- Part of: South African National Defence Force
- Garrison/HQ: Saldanha Bay, Simon's Town, Western Cape, South Africa
- Colors: Green and white
- Fleet: See list
- Website: navy.mil.za

Commanders
- Commander-in-chief: President Cyril Ramaphosa
- Chief of the SANDF: General Rudzani Maphwanya
- Chief of the Navy: Vice Admiral Monde Lobese
- Master at Arms of the Navy: Senior Chief Warrant Officer Matee Molefe
- Notable commanders: Admiral Hugo Biermann, Vice Admiral Refiloe Johannes Mudimu

Insignia
- Ensign

- Jack

The South African Navy (SA Navy) is the naval warfare branch of the South African National Defence Force.

The Navy is primarily engaged in maintaining a conventional military deterrent, participating in counter-piracy operations, fishery protection, search and rescue, and upholding maritime law enforcement for the benefit of South Africa and its international partners.

The South African Navy currently operates a mixed force of warships, submarines, patrol craft, auxiliary vessels and a marine force.

With formerly deep historical and political connections to the United Kingdom, the first emergence of a naval organisation was the creation of the South African Division of the British Royal Naval Volunteer Reserve in 1913, before becoming an nominally independent naval service for the Union of South Africa in 1922.

In its history, South African naval vessels and personnel have participated in the First and Second World Wars, as well as the South African Border War. In the apartheid post-war era, the South African Navy was extensively aligned with NATO and other Western nations against the Soviet Bloc.

== History ==
=== Beginnings ===
Officially, the South African Navy can trace its origins back to the creation of the South African Naval Service on 1 April 1922. Unofficially, however, the Navy has an unbroken association with the Natal Naval Volunteers, formed in Durban on 30 April 1885, and the Cape Naval Volunteers, formed in Cape Town in 1905. On 1 July 1913, following the creation of the Union of South Africa in 1910, the South African Division of the Royal Navy Volunteer Reserve (RNVR[SA]) was established, although with complete organisational and operational control being directed by the Royal Navy.

=== First World War ===
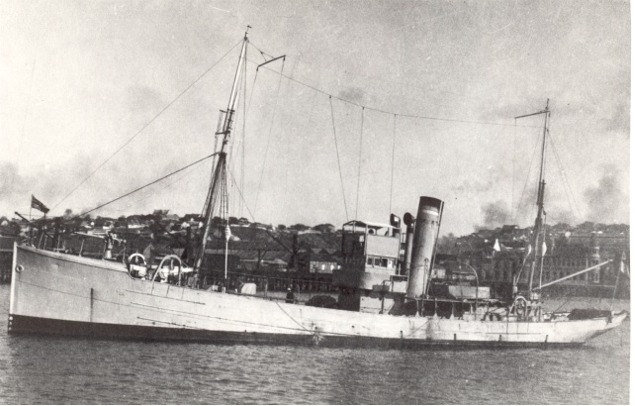
HMSAS Immortelle, circa 1935

As part of the British Empire, South Africa went to war against the Central Powers on 4 August 1914, despite significant Afrikaner opposition. A total of 412 South Africans served in the RNVR[SA] during the war, with 164 members volunteering for the Royal Navy directly. One officer and eight ratings died during the course of the war. South Africans would see service on warships in European waters and the Mediterranean, as well as participate in the land campaigns in German South West Africa and German East Africa. Under Royal Navy jurisdiction, the RNVR (SA) patrolled South African waters in converted fishing vessels, helping in mine clearance in response to the operations of the German raider SMS Wolf in 1917, as well as protecting the strategically important Royal Navy naval base at Simon's Town.

=== Interwar ===
On 1 April 1922, the South African Naval Service (SANS) was formed and, alongside the RNVR (SA), tasked with the protection of territorial waters, minesweeping and hydrography. In the same year, the SANS commissioned the small hydrographic survey ship HMSAS (His/Her Majesty's South African Ship) Protea, two minesweeping converted trawlers HMSAS Immortelle and HMSAS Sonneblom, and the training ship General Botha (the former 19th century cruiser HMS Thames) – all formerly in Royal Navy service. As a result of the Great Depression in 1929, coupled with lack of government investment, the SANS by 1939 had been forced to return all vessels to the Royal Navy. At the outbreak of the Second World War, the service had only three officers and three ratings in its ranks.

=== Second World War ===
The British declaration of war against Germany on 3 September 1939 threw South Africa into a constitutional dilemma due to her status as an autonomous Dominion within the Commonwealth. Prime Minister J.B.M. Hertzog and other anti-British factions of the coalition United Party called for strict neutrality, whilst the more anglophile Deputy Prime Minister Jan Smuts advocated that South Africa was constitutionality, and morally, obliged to support Britain and fight fascism. Two days later, after a close parliamentary vote of 80 to 67 in favour of Smuts, South Africa followed Britain and declared war on Germany.

During October 1939, Rear-Admiral Guy Halifax, a retired Royal Navy officer living in South Africa, was appointed Director of the South African Naval Service, later renamed Seaward Defence Force (SDF) in January 1940. Overseeing a large industrial program of converting civilian whalers and fishing trawlers into military vessels, despite being highly primitive, over 80 such craft would go on to be the backbone of the South African naval forces.

In South African waters, the SDF, in partnership with the Royal Navy, ensured maritime control around the strategic Cape Sea route and was primarily involved in coastal patrol, mine clearance, and significant anti-submarine operations between 1942 and 1945 due to a sustained U-boat offensive, with over 100 merchant ships being sunk off the South African coast.

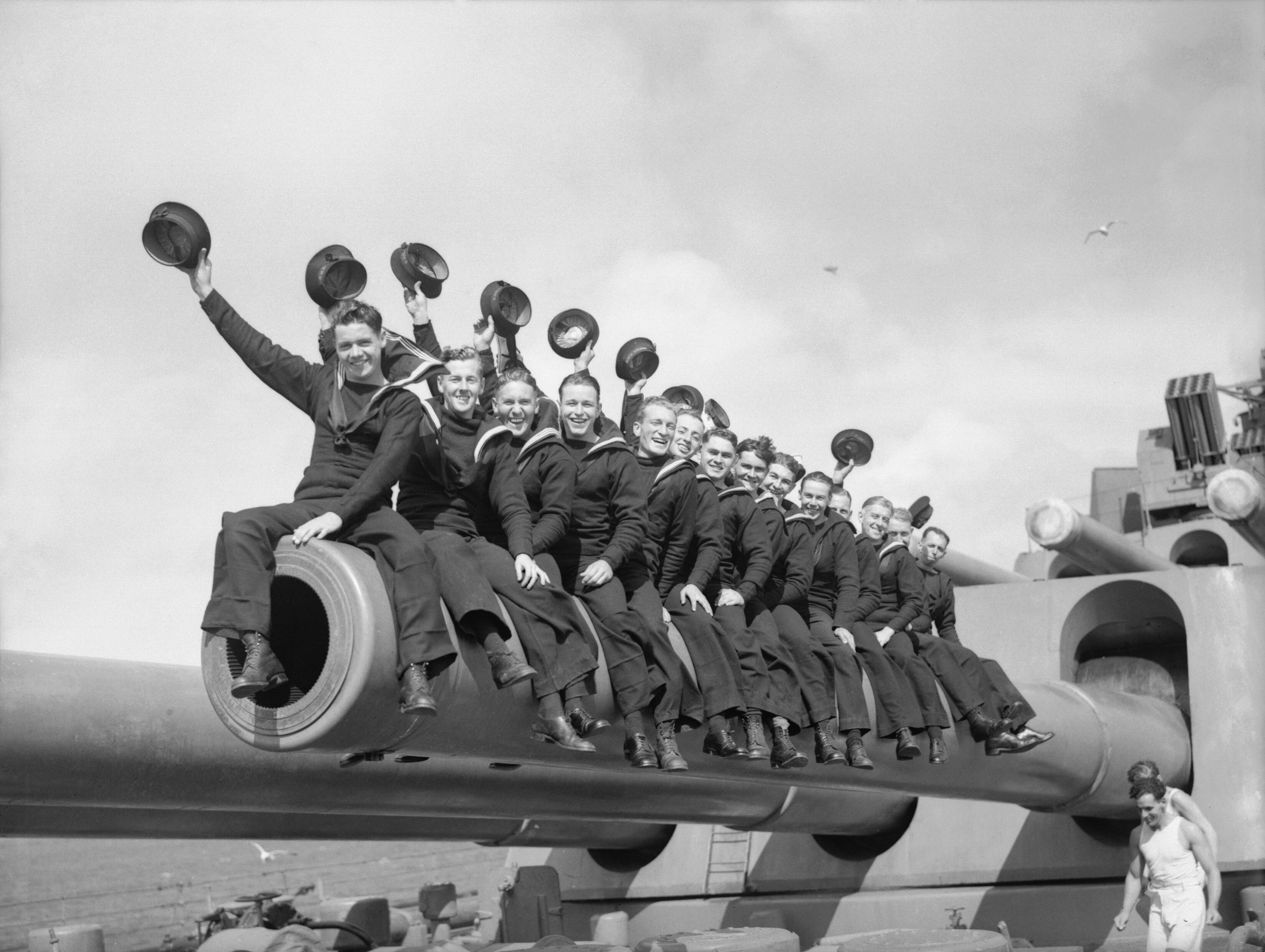
Members of the South African Royal Naval Volunteer Reserve serving on board HMS Nelson during the Second World War

South African naval vessels similarly contributed to the Mediterranean theatre, and later the Far East. From 1941, South Africa assisted in escorting convoys along the North African coast, including the resupply and eventual evacuation of Tobruk, embarked on mine clearance operations, successfully engaged enemy submarines and undertook harbour salvage tasks. In 1942, a unified national naval service emerged following the successful amalgamation of the SDF and RNVR(SA), creating the South African Naval Forces (SANF). As the war came to its end, South Africa received its first purpose-built warships, three Loch-class frigates from the Royal Navy. Deployed to the Far East under British command, South Africa later contributed to operations to liberate Japanese held territory.

In total, over 10,000 service personnel volunteered for service in the SANF, and its predecessors, with 324 losing their lives and 26 battle honours gained.

=== Post war ===
A year after the end of hostilities, on 1 May 1946 South African Naval Forces were reconstituted as part of the Union Defence Force before undertaking its final name change in July 1951, when the SANF officially became known as the South African Navy. The year 1948 was a turning point, not only for South Africa as a country following the National Party's electoral victory, but also the direction of the Navy. British influence became increasingly diminished and curtailed across the service. In 1952, the previously used ship prefix of HMSAS (His/Her Majesty's South African Ship) was changed to just SAS (South African Ship), in 1957, the Royal Navy transferred control of Simon's Town naval base to the SA Navy after 70 years of occupancy and later, in 1959, the St Edward's Crown, which had featured in the Navy cap badge and other insignia, was replaced by the Lion of Nassau from South Africa's coat of arms.

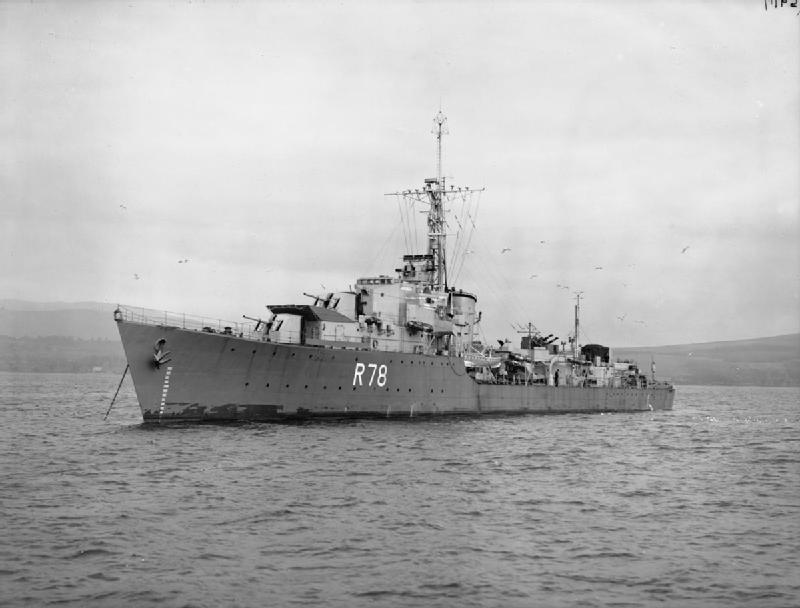
HMS Wessex, seen in 1944, became HMSAS Jan van Riebeeck in 1950

In the immediate post-war years the South African Navy underwent significant levels of qualitative, and quantitative, expansion as the Royal Navy disposed of its surplus war materiel. In 1947, two surplus Algerine-class minesweepers, were acquired from the United Kingdom, HMSAS Bloemfontein (ex Rosamund) and HMSAS Pietermaritzburg (ex HMS Pelorus), as well as the Flower-class corvette HMS Rockrose which was converted into the hydrographic survey ship HMSAS Protea. In 1950, South Africa further expanded her naval capability and purchased the first of two former British W-class destroyers, SAS Jan van Riebeeck, in 1952 SAS Simon van der Stel, and later, the Type 15 anti-submarine frigate SAS Vrystaat (formerly HMS Wrangler).

By the early 1960s, the South African Navy was at its highpoint of international inclusion and had a well balanced, modern, and effective service optimized for conventional naval engagement alongside friendly Western international partners.

From 1962 to 1964, the South African Navy received three British-built Type 12M frigates which formed the President-class : SAS President Kruger, SAS President Steyn and SAS President Pretorius respectively. These were first rate, ocean going fast fleet anti-submarine escorts that propelled the South African Navy into the age of a modern warship operator on equal footing with the West. The order of three Daphné-class submarine from France in 1968—to operate submarines for the first time—again catapulted the service further. The early 1970s would see the South African Navy operating at the height of its blue-water power projection ability with the first of the Daphné-class submarines, SAS Maria van Riebeeck, being commissioned in 1970, with SAS Emily Hobhouse and SAS Johanna van der Merwe entering service the following year.

The second half of the 1970s however saw South Africa facing severe amounts of international isolation and criticism. In 1973 the UN labelled the policy of apartheid a "Crime against Humanity", magnified further by the brutal state repression and subsequent mass incarcerations and deaths following the Soweto uprising in 1976 and the death of prominent anti-apartheid activist Steve Biko in 1977. The following year a UN arms embargo, loosely in place since 1962, became mandatory. The ensuing international economic disinvestment from South Africa was stepped up, placing huge strains on the economy. Coupled with these severe problems, the cornerstones of the country's regional foreign policy faced collapse and complete transformation with the end of Portuguese rule in Angola and Mozambique in 1975, and the negotiated settlement in Ian Smith's Rhodesia to the end of white minority rule in 1979. As South Africa became increasingly involved in the Border War in South West Africa (modern day Namibia) and Angola, the Navy began to readjust its previous international outlook and organisation. The then Minister of Defence, P. W. Botha successfully sought military connections with Israel and nine "Reshef"—Warrior-class in South African service—missile strike craft were ordered in 1974. Following the Soweto uprising and subsequent mandatory arms embargo, South Africa had been forced to accept the cancellation of another significant naval procurement of two new Type-69A light frigates and two Agosta-class submarines from France.

In 1987, South Africa commissioned the locally designed and built Fleet Replenishment ship SAS Drakensberg. Constructed in Durban, it remains the largest and most sophisticated warship to ever have built in South Africa. Three years earlier, the Navy's other support ship, SAS Tafelberg, had undergone a refit that greatly increased her amphibious capabilities. A real boost for the Navy's influence, Tafelberg could deploy a company strength landing force, six landing craft, two medium helicopters and be equipped with a small hospital. Throughout the decade, the South African Navy continued to participate in the Border War and coastal protection. For 23 years (1976–1989) the South African Navy maintained determined sea control around Southern Africa and provided valuable support to land operations. By the end of the 1980s, as white minority rule was coming to a negotiated end, the Navy had lost all of its major surface warships, had a drastically reduced anti-submarine/anti-aircraft capability across the board, and almost complete international isolation. As South Africa disentangled itself from external and internal security operations, the South African Defence Force underwent severe budgetary cuts. The Navy endured a reduction of personnel by 23%, the disbandment of the Marines, the closure of two Naval Commands (Naval Command East and Naval Command West), two Naval Bases at Cape Town and Walvis Bay, and the termination of the relatively advanced program to domestically build replacement submarines. A positive for the Navy during this period however was the acquisition of the multipurpose sealift/replenishment ship SAS Outeniqua, a former Soviet-built Arctic supply vessel, in September 1992 as a replacement for the 35-year-old Tafelberg.

Despite the austere cutbacks, the Navy was leading the way for a South Africa that was slowly being welcomed back into the international community, including becoming a Commonwealth republic on 1 June 1994, even before the landmark elections of 1994. In 1990, the survey vessel SAS Protea became the first South African naval vessel to visit Europe since 1972, and in the same year SAS Drakensberg and two Warrior-class strike craft, SAS Jan Smuts and SAS Hendrik Mentz, sailed for Taiwan in what would be the first time South African vessels had been in the Far East since 1945. Other international visits in the following years included Zaire, Kenya, Bangladesh, Turkey, France, Portugal, and Uruguay. As the "Rainbow nation" was lauded following the ANC victory in the first free democratic elections in 1994, one of the starkest symbols of this new era was the explosion of foreign warships and dignitaries visiting South African ports, often from countries that did not have a previous connection, such as Russia, Poland and Japan. In 1994, 21 foreign vessels from eight countries called at South African ports, with 26 visits from 12 countries in 1995, and 27 from ten countries in 1996. In 1997 the navy celebrated 75 years, with 15 countries sending ships for the festivities.

The acute need to re-equip the navy, including the wider Armed Forces after the lifting of apartheid-era sanctions, was addressed by the Strategic Defence Package of 1999. Better known as the infamous "Arms Deal", the acquisitions in the package, and those persons involved, have been repeatedly subject to substantive allegations of corruption, fraud and bribery. A total of R30 billion (US$4.8 billion in 1999) was pledged to the purchase of modern military equipment. For the navy, its share led to a total transformation from a "brown-water" force of ageing missile patrol craft and short-range submarines, to a force with significant "green-water" combat capability once again. In 2001, with an initial request of five vessels, later reduced to four, the German Meko A200SAN general purpose frigate design was procured, along with four British Super Lynx naval helicopters, and three German Type 209/1400 diesel-powered submarines. Also under construction from 1991 were three locally built T-Craft inshore patrol boats. As South Africa approached the millennium, and beyond, the ANC government gradually returned the Navy to a level of maritime power last seen in the 1960s and 1970s, and successfully reintegrated the service back into maritime operations with regional and international partners.

== South African Navy ==
=== Surface fleet ===
==== Surface combatants ====
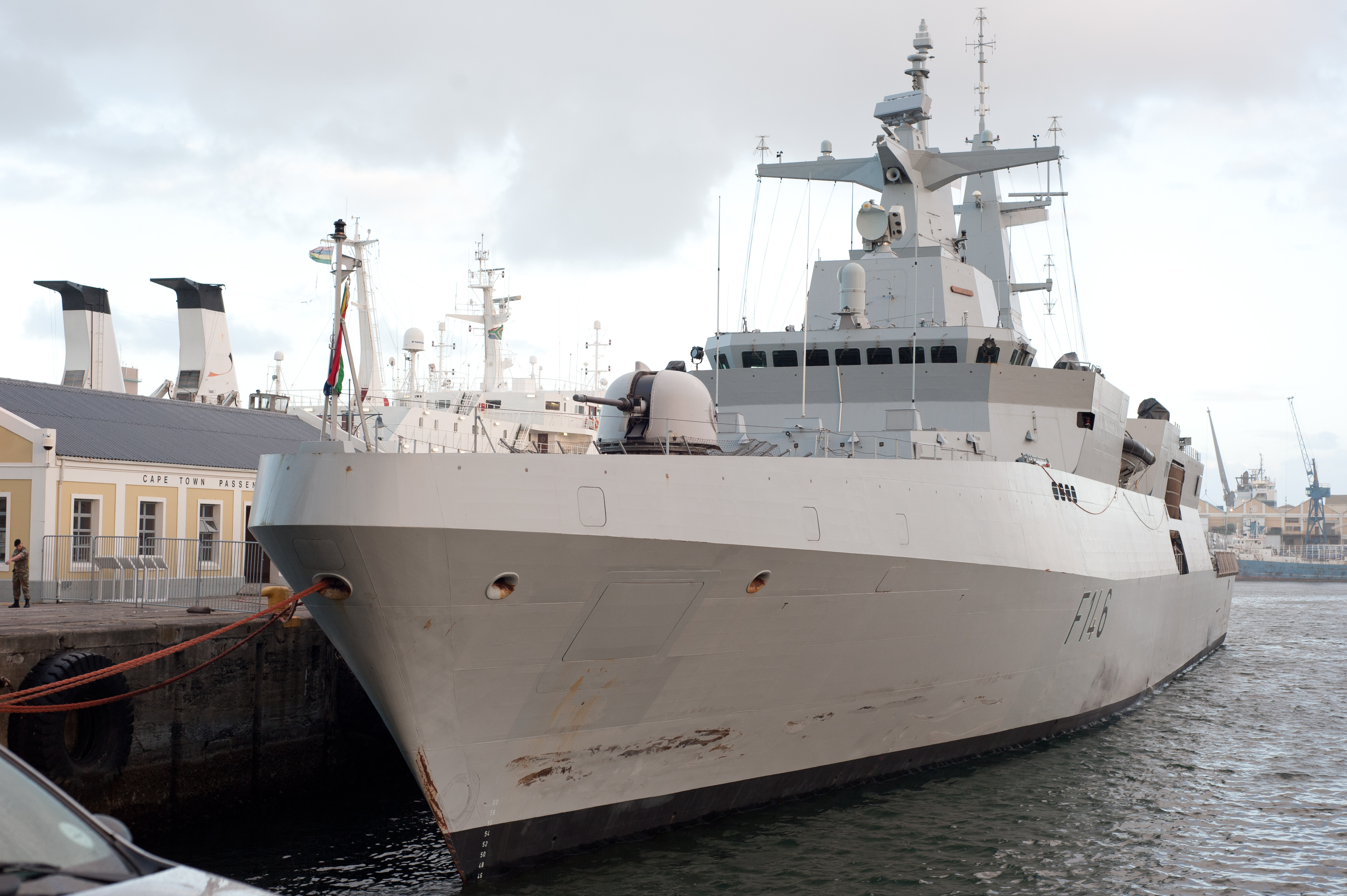
SAS Isandlwana, a Valour-class stealth guided-missile frigate designed for anti-surface, anti-air and anti-submarine warfare.

Commissioned into service from 2006, at a total cost of R9.65 billion under Project Sitron, the four MEKO A-200SANs, the Valour class in South African service, became "easily the most powerful surface combatants in sub-Saharan Africa, and...restored South African naval pre-eminence." Constructed with principles of stealthy design, the class has a 50% smaller radar signature of similar vessel size, 75% less infrared emissions, 20% lower life-cycle cost, 25% lower displacement and 30% fewer crew members.

Specifically designed to conduct sustained operations in the sea conditions found off the South African coast, the four frigates are able to undertake a range of tasks from maritime law enforcement, to civil support, and military operations such as area denial, gunfire support and intelligence collection. The embarked Super Lynx helicopters significantly improve and extend surveillance, as well as all-round operational capabilities. A proposal to equip the frigates with unmanned aerial vehicles (UAVs) to further enhance their surveillance and reconnaissance capabilities was considered, but was sidelined due to budget constraints. With a return to operating general-purpose, multi-mission warships, the Valour class guided-missile frigates have been hailed as modern, impressive and major regional anti-surface, anti-air, and anti-submarine platforms.

SAS Amatola, SAS Isandlwana, SAS Spioenkop, and SAS Mendi possess two four-cell launchers for eight Exocet surface to surface missiles, a 32-cell domestically built Umkhonto vertical launching system (VLS) for air defence, a single OTO Melara 76 mm (3.0 in) main gun, a twin Denel 35 mm (1.4 in) Dual Purpose Gun, two Oerlikon 20 mm (0.79 in) cannons, and two Rogue 12.7 mm (0.50 in) remotely operated machine guns. The frigates are also fitted with four 324 mm (12.8 in) torpedo tubes arranged in two dual launchers; however, the SA Navy has not procured the lightweight torpedoes required to arm them. As a result, the class relies on its embarked Super Lynx helicopters for anti-submarine warfare capability. As of 2026, the class is undergoing phased refits and capability upgrades under Project Syne, the SA Navy's long-term frigate modernisation programme.

==== Patrol flotilla ====
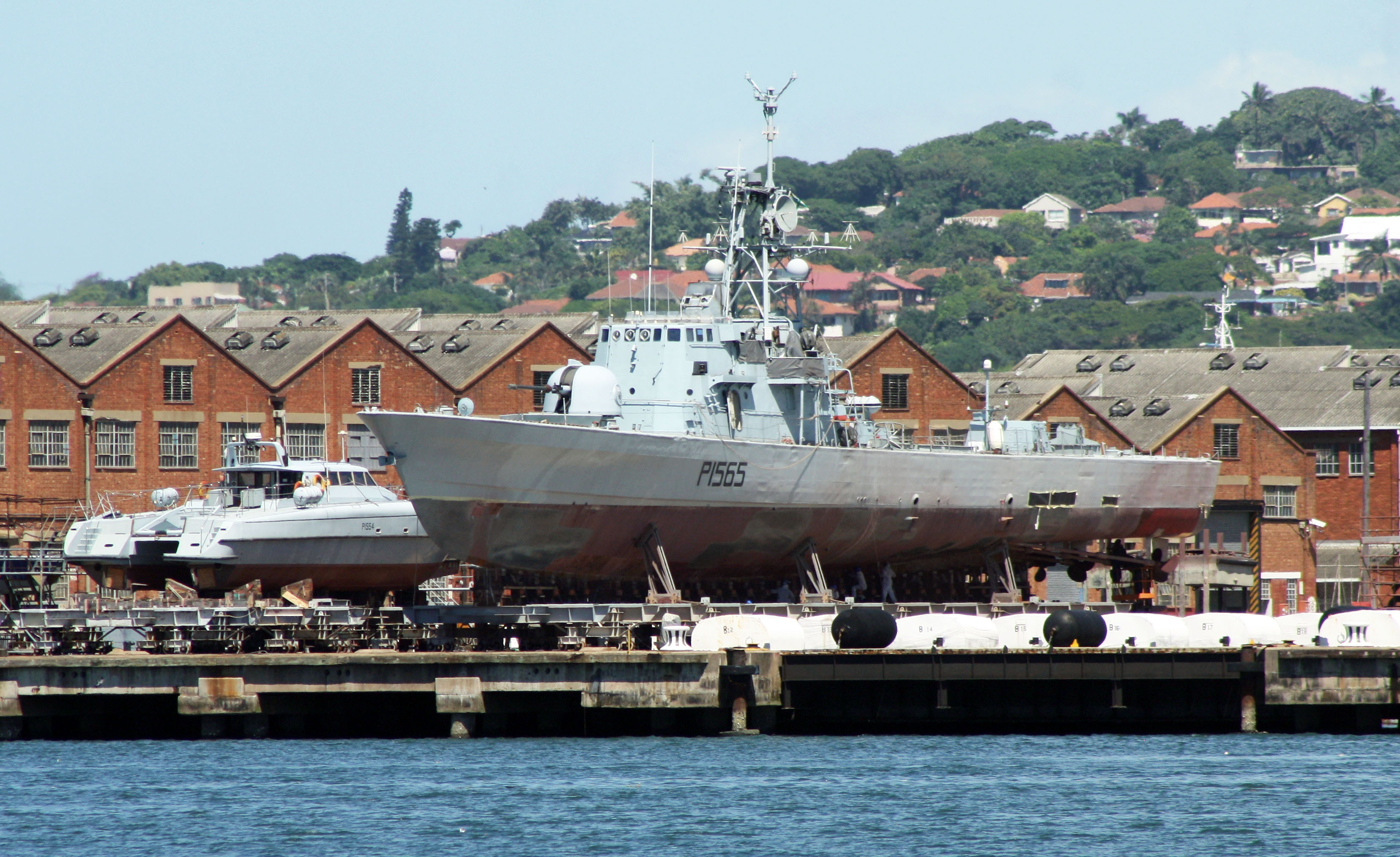
Warrior-class strike craft SAS Isaac Dyobha (right) alongside a T Craft-class patrol vessel (left) during maintenance in dry dock.

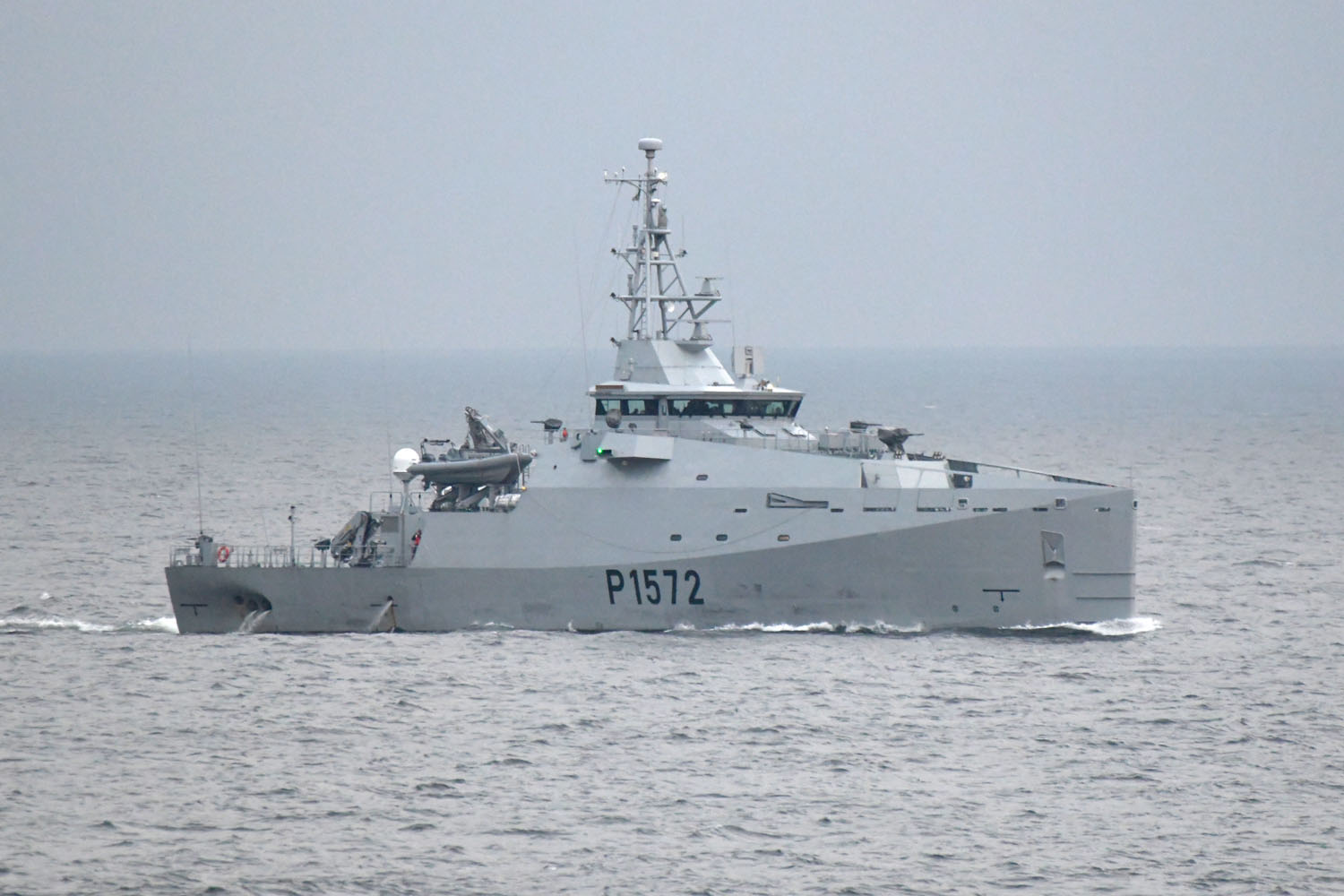
SAS King Shaka Zulu, a Warrior-class multi-mission inshore patrol vessel (MMIPV) commissioned under Project Biro.

As the SA Navy has a strength of only four primary surface warships, in an effort to improve asset availability in more routine littoral patrol operations and ease the stress on sophisticated, but ill-suited, warships, three previously decommissioned Warrior-class strike craft, which served as the Navy's principal surface combatants during the late apartheid era, were modernised and recommissioned as offshore patrol vessels (OPVs) between 2012 and 2014 – SAS Isaac Dyobha, SAS Galeshewe and SAS Makhanda. Of the original nine strike craft acquired under Projects Japonica and later Coupé, only Makhanda remains in commission as of February 2023.

Reflecting their new policing role, the Warriors' old Skerpioen (Gabriel Mk 2) missile launchers and the rear 76 mm gun were removed. In replacement, the craft have gained the capacity to support a small rigid-hulled inflatable boat (RHIB) and a limited contingent of Naval Infantry for boarding suspect vessels, as well as maintaining their original 20 mm cannon and 12.7 mm heavy machine guns.

Between June 2022 and October 2025, the Patrol Flotilla was strengthened by the commissioning of three Warrior-class multi-mission inshore patrol vessels (MMIPVs) – SAS King Sekhukhune I, SAS King Shaka Zulu and SAS Adam Kok III – constructed by Damen Shipyards Cape Town. Based on the Damen Stan Patrol 6211 design, the vessels have the capacity to embark two rigid-hulled inflatable boats (RHIBs) for boarding operations and are armed with a Reutech 20 mm Super Sea Rogue remotely operated cannon. The SA Navy has identified a long-term requirement for a fleet of up to 15 MMIPVs and an additional 15 larger multi-mission offshore patrol vessels (MMOPVs) to further strengthen its coastal and offshore patrol capabilities, although it remains unclear how this expansion will be funded.

Alongside the Warrior-class strike craft and the newer MMIPVs are the much smaller T Craft class, with three entering service from 1992. Constructed with twin-hulled catamarans of glass-reinforced plastic sandwich construction, three have also been built for Israel in 1997. The T Craft, with their far lighter construction and smaller size, undertake maritime security patrols considerably closer to the shore and inspect various inlets and bays. SAS Tobie, SAS Tern, and SAS Tekwane are equipped with a single 12.7 mm Browning machine gun and have the capacity to embark a RHIB with a small complement of Naval Infantry to inspect vessels.

Primarily, the Patrol Flotilla undertake the more traditional naval task of patrolling South Africa's exclusive economic zone and upholding maritime law enforcement. In addition to its principal patrol vessels, the flotilla also operates several smaller patrol boats and support craft employed in harbour security, inshore patrol and training duties. Ordinary tasks include anti-smuggling, monitoring against illegal immigration, search and rescue, fishery inspection, and routine border protection. With the ability to operate far out into the Cape and handle the often rough seas, the Flotilla is also expected to complement the navies combat ability, particularly when undertaking anti-piracy patrols in the Mozambique Channel.

==== Mine warfare ====
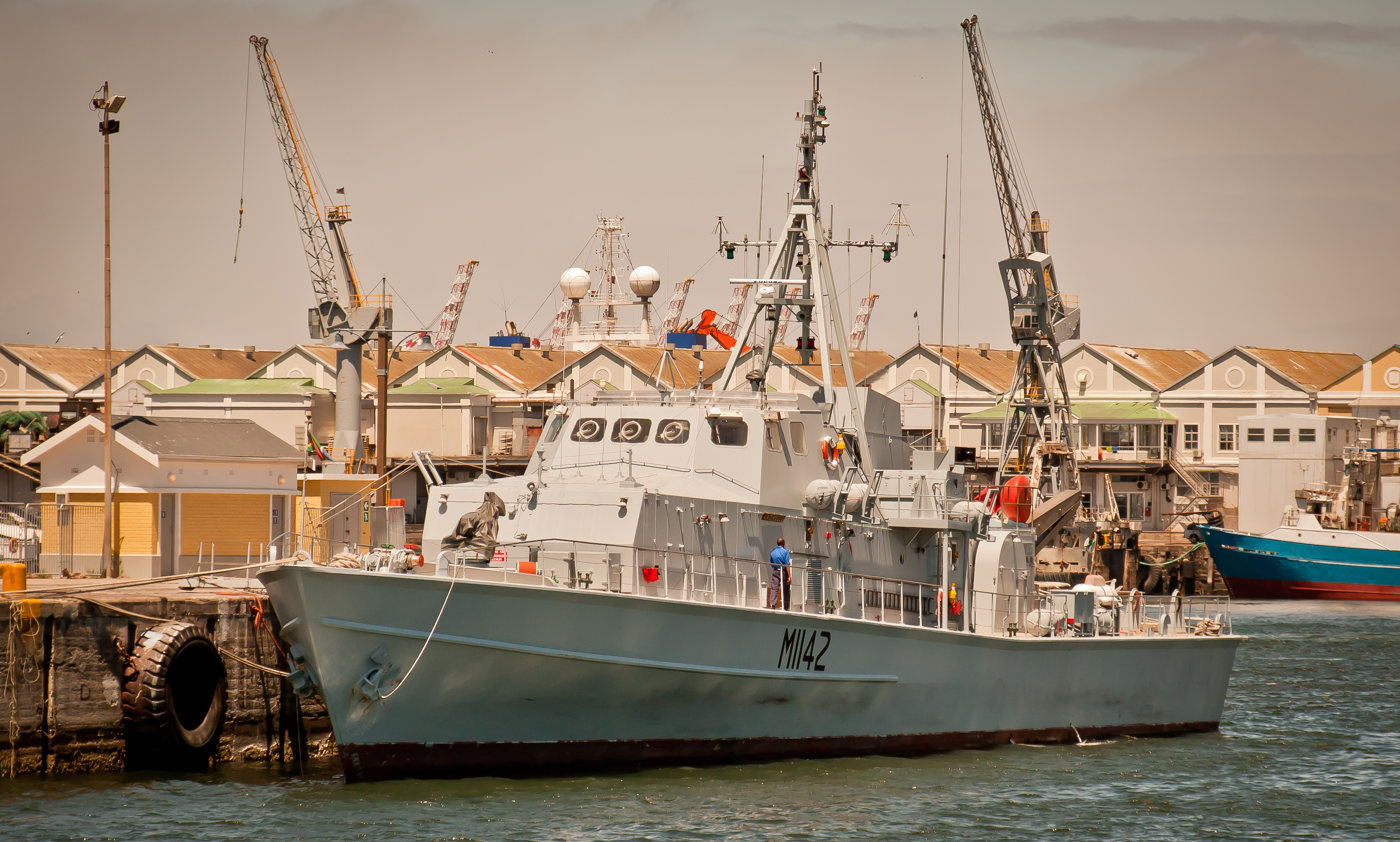
River-class mine countermeasures vessel SAS Umzimkulu (M1142)

As of 2020, four River-class coastal mine countermeasures vessels remain in commission with the SA Navy, although two are in reduced operational use. They are believed to have lost their mine-hunting capabilities due to the retirement of the antiquated PAP104 autonomous underwater vehicles (AUVs). Whilst still maintaining a decompression chamber for operational diving, the River class are now deployed on general coastal defence duties, and are equipped with a single Oerlikon 20 mm cannon, two 12.7 mm machine guns, and a RHIB.

In 2025, the SA Navy began rebuilding its mine warfare capability through Exercise Phoenix, which tested newly acquired REMUS 100 AUVs, updated mine countermeasure doctrines and new operational procedures. As part of Project Motso, the Navy is developing a containerised mine warfare capability that can be deployed aboard the new MMIPVs, allowing them to perform both routine patrol and mine countermeasure operations. The concept is intended to provide a flexible and rapidly deployable capability by enabling standard patrol vessels to be reconfigured for mine warfare when required.

==== Auxiliary fleet ====
With the retirement of SAS Outeniqua in 2004, SAS Drakensberg became the SA Navy's sole fleet replenishment ship. Commissioned in 1993, Outeniqua served for just over 11 years as the Navy's largest combat support and ice-strengthened sealift vessel, replacing SAS Tafelberg before being withdrawn from service due to high operating costs and incompatibility with the newly commissioned Valour class frigates.

Drakensberg's primary role is to support combat vessels at sea through replenishment operations. The ship is also modified to carry two RHIBs, as well as two landing craft utility (LCU) for limited amphibious operations. Since the end of minority rule, Drakensberg has participated in numerous humanitarian assistance, disaster relief and anti-piracy operations, while also undertaking international goodwill voyages and representing South Africa in multinational naval exercises. In 2023, the SA Navy announced plans to acquire a replacement fleet replenishment vessel to succeed Drakensberg as part of its long-term fleet modernisation programme.

The SA Navy also operates the specialist hydrographic survey vessel SAS Protea, commissioned in 1972. As South Africa's only dedicated hydrographic survey ship, Protea is responsible for conducting hydrographic and oceanographic surveys, producing and updating nautical charts, supporting safe navigation, and assisting scientific research around the South African coastline and neighbouring waters. The vessel is expected to be replaced by the new hydrographic survey vessel SAS Nelson Mandela, although its construction has experienced delays.

=== Submarine fleet ===
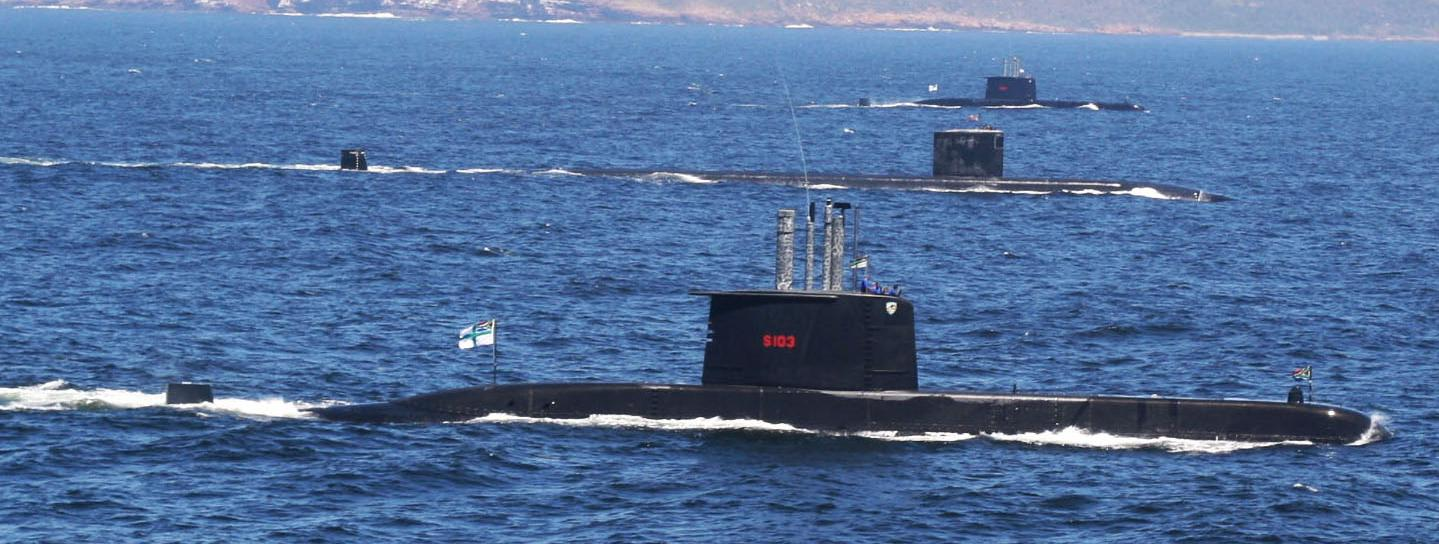
South African submarines SAS Charlotte Maxeke (S102) and SAS Queen Modjadji (S103), accompanies the United States Navy Los Angeles-class submarine USS San Juan (center), into False Bay in Simon's Town, South Africa on 4 November 2009.

Between 2004 and 2008, three German-built Type 209/1400 Heroine class submarines were commissioned under Project Wills as a like-for-like replacement for the ageing Daphné-class submarines. Representing a significant advancement in underwater performance, endurance and combat capability, the Heroine class restored the Navy's modern submarine force and remains among the most advanced conventional submarines operated on the African continent.

South Africa is one of only three states on the African continent, along with Algeria and Egypt, that currently operate submarine assets, and the only state in the sub-Saharan region. Following years of deferred maintenance and funding constraints, the fleet underwent a prolonged decline in availability. However, in 2025 the Navy commenced its long-delayed submarine sustainment programme after awarding a refit contract to Babcock Ntuthuko Engineering. As of 2026, Phase One refits of SAS Charlotte Maxeke and SAS Queen Modjadji I are progressing under the programme, with further restoration work planned to improve the long-term availability of the class.

Designed for anti-surface, anti-submarine and intelligence-gathering operations, the Heroine class is capable of extended underwater patrols, maritime surveillance, special forces deployment and sea denial operations. Each submarine is equipped with eight 533 mm (21 in) bow-mounted torpedo tubes capable of carrying and launching up to 14 AEG SUT 264 heavyweight torpedoes against both surface ships and submarines. The class was also designed with provision for integrating UGM-84 Sub-Harpoon anti-ship missiles, although this capability has not been implemented. In addition, Germany has developed the IDAS missile system for the Type 209 family, providing a potential future capability against air threats, small surface vessels and coastal land targets, although it has not been adopted by the SA Navy.

=== Aviation ===
Although the SA Navy does not directly operate aircraft, aviation support is provided by 22 Squadron of the South African Air Force, which operates:

- 1 × Atlas Oryx Mk 2 medium utility helicopter, primarily deployed aboard SAS Drakensberg.
- 4 × Westland Super Lynx 300 Mk 64 maritime helicopters, with one assigned to each Valour-class frigate.

These aircraft undertake anti-submarine warfare (ASW), anti-surface warfare (ASuW), maritime surveillance, logistics, search and rescue (SAR), and personnel transport missions, significantly extending the operational reach of the fleet. A programme to introduce shipborne UAVs has also been proposed to supplement the Navy's helicopter capability, although it has not progressed due to budget constraints. Prior to their retirement, the Navy also operated the Westland Wasp in the maritime anti-submarine role.

=== Marines ===
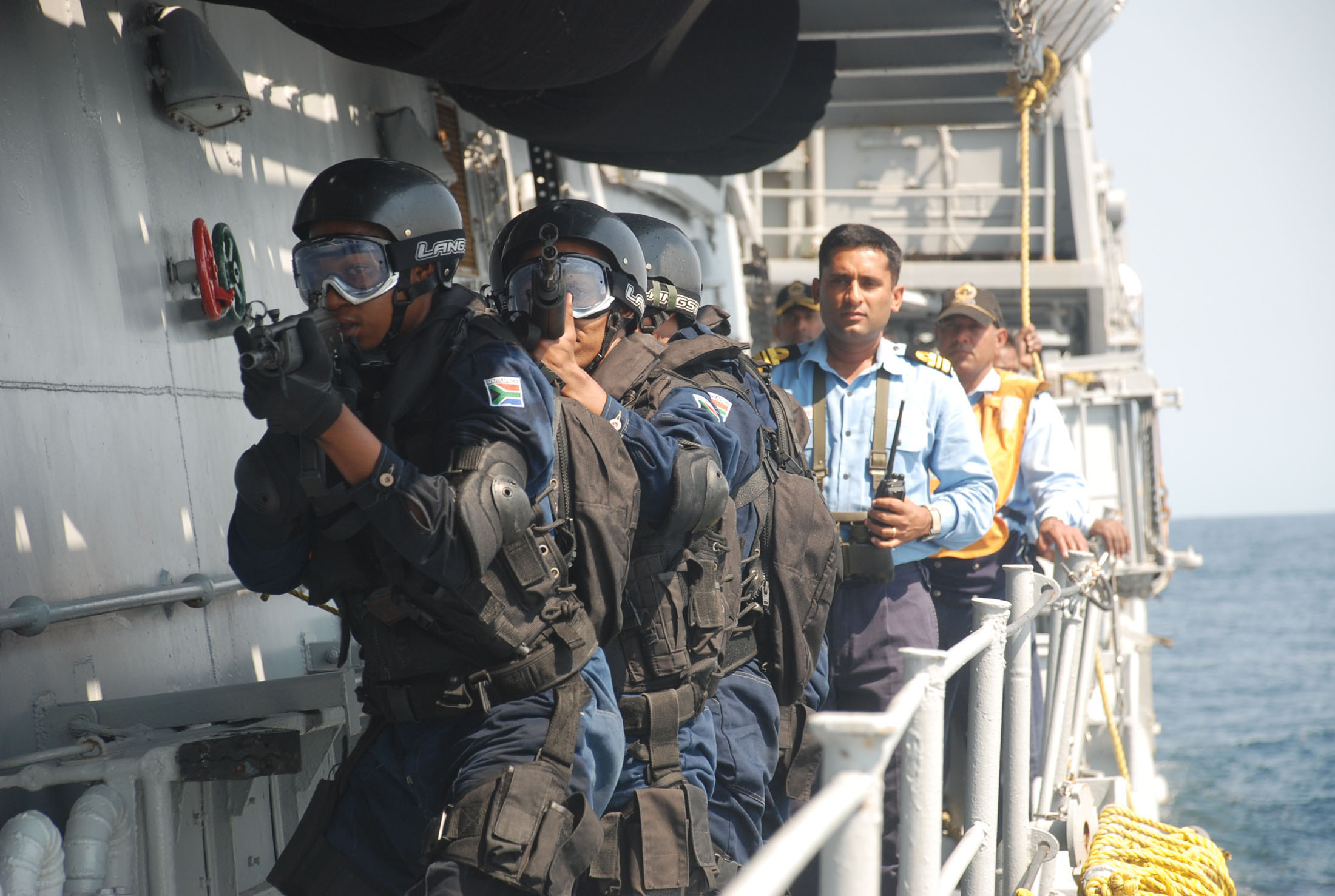
Marines of the Maritime Reaction Squadron during a joint exercise aboard an Indian Navy ship.

The South African Marine Corps was first established as a sub-branch of the Navy in 1951 until 1955 and then reformed in 1979 until 1990, both times with the primary purpose of protecting the country's harbours. The Marines also acted as regular infantry during the war until 1988, as well as performing counter-insurgency operations inside South Africa. The Marines had an amphibious landing capability by operating from SAS Tafelberg and SAS Drakensberg, with an elite company, named the Marine Amphibious Company (MAC), being formed to ensure beach-head capability for landing large task forces, along with a small elite reconnaissance detachment between 1983 and 1989. The Marines were disbanded on 18 January 1990, following a major restructuring of the Navy at the end of the South African Border War.

In 2005, the decision was taken to create a Naval Rapid Deployment Force so that South Africa could commit more to peacekeeping operations across the continent, particularly in the Great Lakes region. In 2006, this force became the Maritime Reaction Squadron. The Maritime Reaction Squadron provides an amphibious, diving and small boat capability to the Navy, deploying infantry-trained South African Navy personnel in various peacekeeping roles within the African continent, as well as assisting in boarding operations at sea, and humanitarian and disaster relief.

The squadron consists of the following components:

- Operational Boat Division (OBD) with 10 Namacurra-class harbour patrol boats and six Lima-class utility landing craft
- Reaction Force Division (RFD) consisting of one naval infantry company with a command and support element
- Operational Diving Division (ODD) consisting of four operational diving teams of 17 divers.

=== Naval weapon systems ===
Model	Image	Origin	Type	Platform	Notes
Anti-air missiles
Umkhonto-IR (Block 2)		South Africa	Surface-to-air missile (medium range)	Valour class	Launched from the 32-cell Umkhonto vertical launching system (VLS), with one missile carried per cell for a total of 32 missiles.
Cruise missiles
Exocet MM40 (Block 2)		France	Anti-ship cruise missile	Valour class	Launched from 2 quad-packed launchers, with four missiles carried per launcher for a total of 8 missiles).
Gabriel Mk 2 Skerpioen		Israel South Africa	Anti-ship cruise missile	Warrior class strike craft	Launched from 2 three-cell launchers, with six missiles carried per ship prior to the vessels' conversion into offshore patrol vessels (OPVs).
Torpedoes
AEG SUT 264 (Atlas Elektronik)		Germany	Heavyweight torpedo	Heroine class	Launched from eight 533 mm bow torpedo tubes, with capacity for up to 14 heavyweight torpedoes or anti-ship cruise missiles. Plans to replace these torpedoes were announced in 2017, but no further progress has been publicly disclosed.
Anti-mine drones
REMUS A100		United States	Autonomous underwater vehicle	Warrior class MMIPV	Acquired in 2025 to replace the retired PAP 104 and support the implementation of Project Motso.
Naval guns
OTO Melara 76mm/62 Super Rapid		Italy	Naval artillery gun	Valour class Warrior class strike craft	Valour-class frigate (1 foredeck gun, combining the Super Rapid barrel and feed system with the original compact gun mount, capable of firing up to 120 rounds per minute) Warrior-class strike craft (1 compact foredeck gun, capable of firing up to 85 rounds per minute)
Denel 35mm Dual Purpose Gun		South Africa	Close-in weapon system	Valour class	Valour-class frigate (2 GA35 rapid-fire automatic cannons mounted side by side in an unmanned low radar observable turret)
Reutech Rogue		South Africa	Remote controlled weapon station	Valour class Warrior class MMIPV	Valour-class frigate (2 Sea Rogue turrets) Warrior-class MMIPV (1 Super Rogue turret)
Oerlikon GAM-B01		SwitzerlandUnited Kingdom	Autocannon	Valour class Warrior class strike craft River class Drakensberg class	Valour-class frigate (2 guns) Warrior-class strike craft (2 guns) Dakensberg class (4 guns) River-class mine hunter (1 gun)
Small arms
M2 Browning		United States	Heavy machine gun	—	Mounted as stationary and support weapons on various warships, patrol craft, RHIBs and helicopters.
FN MAG		Belgium	General-purpose machine gun	—	Mounted as stationary and support weapons on various warships, patrol craft, RHIBs and helicopters.
Vektor SS-77		South Africa	General-purpose machine gun	—	Mounted as stationary and support weapons on various warships, patrol craft, RHIBs and helicopters.

== Future of the South African Navy ==
As the SA Navy enters the 2020s, the service faces significant challenges if it is to arrest its current decline. At the opening of the South African Maritime Security Conference on 31 May 2018 in Cape Town, Chief of the Navy Vice Admiral Hlogwane warned that:

'the navy sits at the crossroads where its very existence is threatened... Some of the countries in the SADC are injecting financial resources to build their military capacity through acquisition programmes. Conversely, South Africa is on a path of reduced defence expenditure."

At a speech a year later on 12 July 2019, Hlongwane, recognising the struggling economy, again reminded his audience that:

"in the absence of a clear and present military threat, the government will find it difficult to justify spending large sums of money on defence. The platforms acquired under the Strategic Defence Packages (four frigates and three submarines) are beginning to suffer from lack of funds for support and maintenance, [and] urgently require refits in order to keep them operational to the end of their 30-year design lives...while the new hydrographic survey vessel and IPVs are modern robust ships fully suited to perform their missions, they will not significantly improve the combat capability of the SAN which is required to defend our country and national interests in terms of our constitutional mandate...the naval balance of power is shifting on our continent."

=== Budget ===
The South African defence budget has been on a downward trajectory since 1994 when expenditure was 4.56% of GDP. In 2010, that level was 1.92%, and in 2020, expenditure is expected to fall to around 0.59%, its lowest level since 1960. For 2020/21, the Defence Budget totals R52.4 billion (£2.4 billion), with the SA Navy being allocated R4.9 billion (£226 million), roughly 9%. South African defence spending however has not matched recent inflation levels, an average of 5% annually, which has pushed the Department of Defence deeper into financial difficulties and operational consequences.

As a whole, the Defence Budget for 2020/21 has been given 87% of its required funding, a shortfall of R9.4 billion (£433 million). The SA Navy for 2020/21 has been allocated only 65% of what is reportedly required, a shortfall of R2.8 billion (£130 million). As a result of the declining financial situation, the Navy has warned that it will seriously struggle to maintain its current capabilities, levels of investment, and international commitments. As a result of COVID-19, as well as ongoing problems within the South African economy, GDP is expected to fall by 5.6% in 2020/21, with significant ramifications for the country and the South African Navy.

=== Operational hours ===
In 2013/14, the SA Navy operated with an annual target of 22,000 hours at sea. By 2018/19 this number had been lowered to 12,000 hours, with a further reduction to 10,000 hours annually from 2019/20. By its own admission, the Navy requires a minimum of 12,000 hours (500 days) at sea per year to sufficiently train personnel, with an absolute minimum of 7,800 hours dedicated annually to fulfil its Force Employment obligations of border protection, maritime security, and anti-piracy operations. Despite these requirements, by 2019/20 the SA Navy is financially resourced for only 6,000 hours at sea, and only 4,320 hours allocated for Force Employment operations. Vice Admiral Hlongwane has warned:

"Should sea hours be reduced below 10 000 per year, the SA Navy will decline rapidly and...any further reduction in sea hours will impact severely on individual and team training at sea, maintaining safety at sea and the safe navigation of all SA Navy vessels."

=== Skills recruitment ===
In addition, the SA Navy is facing an acute skills shortage which is severely frustrating vessel availability. Vice Admiral Hlongwane stated that "the Navy Engineering capability is now extremely limited, which will increasingly impact on the safety and seaworthiness of ships and submarines and their ability to deploy." It is currently a cause for concern whether or not the SA Navy has the required skills to fully crew multiple highly sophisticated warships and submarines simultaneously.

=== Future acquisitions ===
Despite the current budgetary crisis within South African defence spending, the purchase of the three new inshore patrol vessels (IPVs), termed Project Biro and also the procurement of a new hydrographic survey vessel, Project Hotel have been approved in recent years. These acquisitions have been linked to the Government's broader aims of development of the ocean economy – Operation Phakisa. With 90% of imports and exports dependent on the sea, South Africa's exclusive economic zone which is reportedly rich in natural resources, and the estimated loss of nearly $23bn annually to illegal and unregulated fishing, the SA Navy has successfully argued that maritime security is crucial to the national interest and economic development.

==== Project Biro ====
Since 2013, the ambition for the SA Navy was the domestic construction of three offshore, and a minimum of six (later reduced to three) inshore patrol vessels as a replacement for the increasingly aged Warrior-class OPVs and River-class OPV/IPVs, as part of Project Biro. However, in 2018 it was confirmed that only the three MMIPVs (multi-mission inshore patrol vessel) would be constructed, with the OPVs being cancelled as a cost-saving measure. The new vessels will also be named the Warrior-class, and cost R3.6 billion.

Whilst the introduction of these three modern IPVs will immediately play a crucial role in maritime law enforcement, it has been regretted by analysts that the offshore craft option was not also financially feasible. It had been hoped that the OPVs, with their helicopter carrying abilities, would have played a much more effective role in policing South Africa's extensive exclusive economic zone (1.5 million km), particularly in the rough seas of the Cape. It was even reported in 2011 that nine OPVs could be constructed, without any IPVs, due to the rough sea state off the coast and the practical experience gained which favoured larger vessels.

In 2021, it was announced that the aging Warrior-class OPVs would undergo phased decommissioning as the new Warrior-class IPVs come online.

First laid down in February 2019 at Damen Shipyards Cape Town (DSCT), the timeline of delivery to the SA Navy of all three vessels is March 2022, June 2023 and September 2024 respectively. Armscor, the state acquisition agency, has an option from DSCT to purchase additional inshore patrol vessels at the same price the original three were bought for.

==== Project Hotel ====
The second future acquisition programme for the SA Navy falls under Project Hotel, the replacement of the sole hydrographic survey vessel SAS Protea. The construction of this new vessel, currently being built by Durban-based Sandock Austral Shipyard, will represent a major upgrade in capability for the Navy. Whilst SAS Protea was built in 1972, her replacement will be based on Vard Marine's VARD 9 105 science vessel, specifically adapted for South African service and 'incorporates the latest hydrographic and oceanographic sensor suite'. The ship will be an evolution from the Vard Marine designed HMS Echo and HMS Enterprise which have been in Royal Navy service since 2002.

Also as part of Project Hotel, the SA Navy will receive two next-generation survey motor boats, one sea boat, and another inshore survey motor boat to be kept ashore in reserve, as well as upgrading shore-based hydrographic infrastructure. The project has a current completion date target of August 2023, with the first of the motor boats being launched in September 2020.

==== Issues ====
As of 2020, the SA Navy's main projects are under serious threat from years of underfunding, as well as recent budget cuts. Allocation of funding for Projects Biro (modern inshore patrol vessels) and Hotel (replacement hydrographic survey vessel), as well as the Army's Project Hoefyster (new infantry combat vehicles), amounts to R2.8 billion (£129 million), however the required level of funding needed is expected to be R13.7 billion (£633 million), nearly a R11 billion shortfall (£508 million). It is currently unclear how these projects will be financed if they continue to proceed.

Similarly, Project Syne and Project Napoleon, the planned and urgently required midlife overhauls for the Valour class and Heroine class respectively, are both currently on hold due to lack of adequate funding. According to a 2021 Department of Defence (DoD) progress report, the full repair cost requirement of R1.470 billion is only 53.4% funded, with R786 million allocated. The SA Navy is currently finding it difficult to effectively resource the growing backlog of refits, maintenance periods, and repair projects that are needed. With each delay due to financial insufficiency and every vessel that continues to operate without adequate maintenance, the SA Navy is pulled deeper into a vicious cycle of exacerbating known issues and escalating longer-term costs, until a point of forced reduced vessel availability.

== Command, control and organisation ==
The command structure is depicted below. The Chief of the Navy, based at Navy Headquarters at the Navy Office (SAS Immortelle) located in Pretoria, is head of the South African Navy. All operational forces, including ships and submarines, fall under the control of the Flag Officer Fleet who is based in Simon's Town.

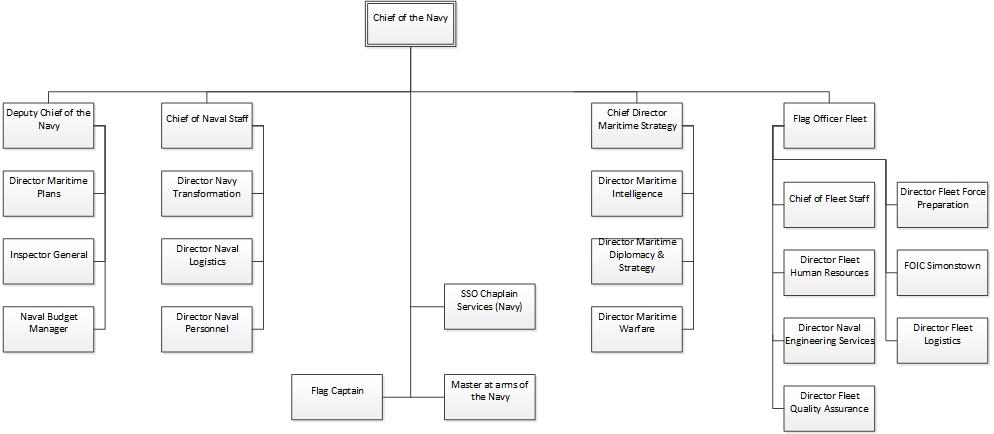

Chief of the SA Navy Vice Adm M. Lobese
Deputy Chief Navy; R Adm Bubele Mhlana	Chief of Naval Staff; R Adm S Makhanya	Chief Director Maritime Strategy; R Adm Musawenkosi Nkomonde	Flag Officer Fleet; R Adm H.T Matsane	
Director Maritime Plans; R Adm (JG) Godfrey Masimala	Director Naval Personnel; R Adm (JG) X. T. Hakoma	Director Maritime Warfare; R Adm (JG) S F Du Toit	Chief of Fleet Staff; R Adm (JG) J G Rustin-Patrick	Director Fleet Force Preparation; R Adm (JG) Jabulani Mbotho
Inspector General (SA Navy); R Adm (JG) Kwaedi Mabula	Director Naval Logistics	Director Maritime Intelligence; R Adm (JG) M Bongco	Director Fleet Logistics; R Adm (JG) Joseph Ikaneng	Director Fleet Human Resources -
Naval Budget Manager; Mrs R. Mamaguvhi	Director Naval Transformation; R Adm (JG) P Mboyise	Director Maritime Diplomacy & Strategy; R Adm (JG) Joseph Dlamini	Director Naval Engineering Services; R Adm (JG) B Mvovo	Flag Officer Commanding NB Simons Town; R Adm (JG) Sikumbuzo Msikinya
Director Naval Reserves; R Adm (JG) R. Ndabambi			Director Fleet Quality Assurance; Capt (SAN) M. A Boucher	

=== Fleet Command ===
Fleet Command includes all vessels and units of the Navy other than Naval Headquarters, Pretoria. Fleet Command is based in Simon's Town under control of Flag Officer Fleet.

Four directorates are responsible for the day to day control of Fleet Command:

- Director Fleet Force Preparations (DFPP) is responsible for the day-to-day running of the ships and submarines and for ensuring their operational readiness. The Maritime Reaction Squadron and NavComCens also report to DFFP
- Director Fleet Human Resources (DFHR) is responsible for all training and manning and also controls the training units.
- Director Fleet Quality Assurance (DFQA) is responsible for the output of Fleet Command and monitoring quality assurance throughout Fleet Command
- Director Fleet Logistics (DFL) is responsible for all Logistics units as well as for the maintenance of the fleet.

=== Current deployments ===
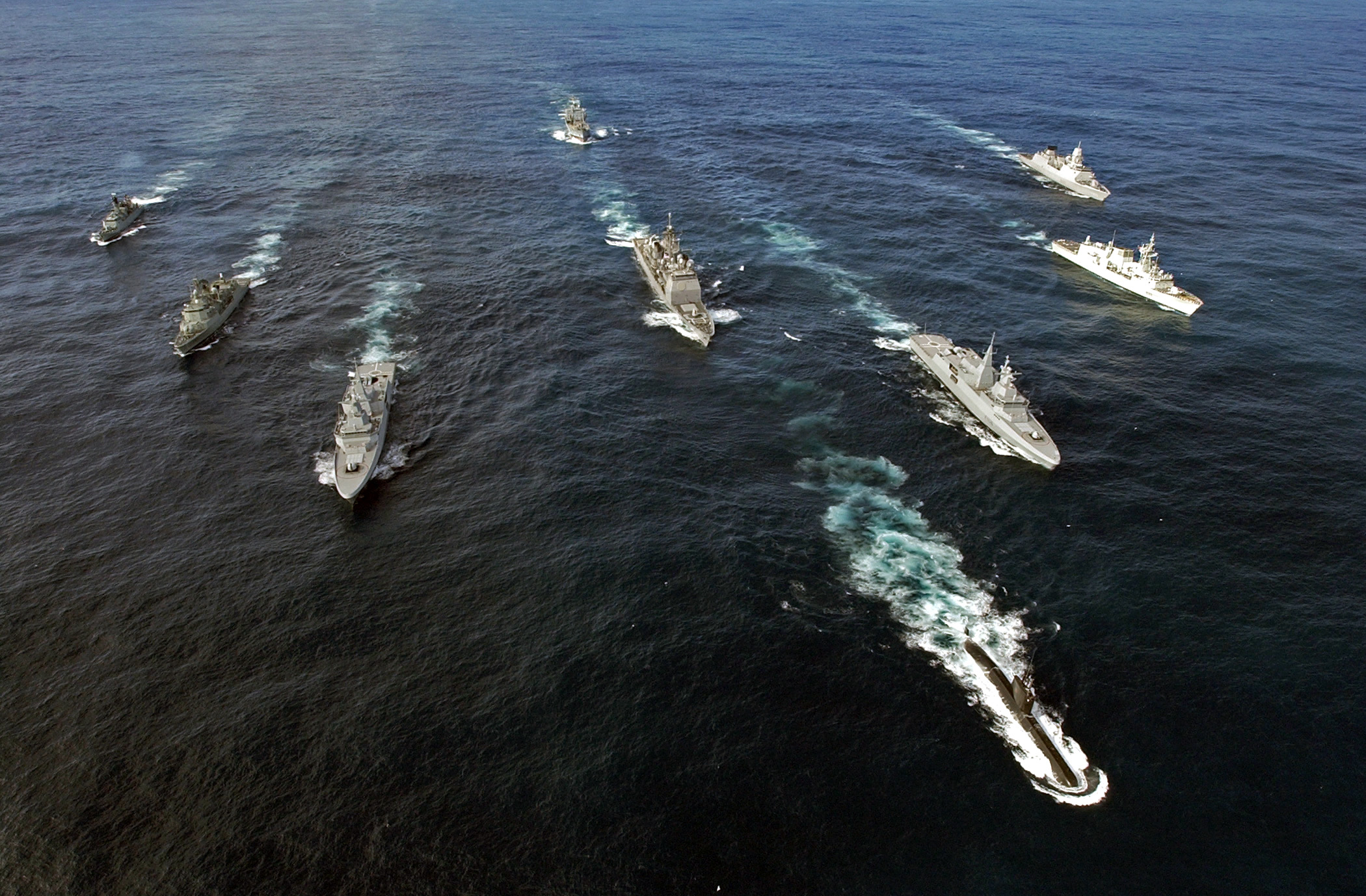
The Standing NATO Maritime Group (SNMG) 1 in formation with South African navy warships SAS Amatola (F145), SAS Isandlwana (F146) and the submarine SAS Manthatisi (S101) while participating in Exercise Amazolo

The SA Navy maintains the traditional role of providing a credible military deterrent, protecting South African interests against possible enemy attack, and participating in African Union peacekeeping missions. As the likelihood of a naval engagement against a conventional enemy is extremely unlikely, the South African Navy today is primarily engaged in counter-piracy, fishery protection, and anti-smuggling operations.

Deploying at least a single Valour-class frigate or one Heroine-class submarine, along with aircraft from the South African Air Force, the SA Navy often undertakes exercises with others, such as the United States Navy (Exercise Shared Accord/Southern Accord), NATO naval battlegroups (Exercise Amazolo), the French Navy (the annual Exercise Oxide), the German Navy (the biennial Exercise Good Hope), the Royal Navy (ad hoc exercises when visiting South African waters), the Indian Navy (the biennial Exercise IBSAMAR), and the navies of Uruguay and Brazil (Exercises Atlasur and IBSAMAR).

For the 2010 FIFA World Cup, the navy provided air and sea security by deploying three frigates as guard ships off the cities of Durban, Port Elizabeth and Cape Town.

==== Operation Copper ====
Since 2011, one of the SA Navy's major and long-standing focuses has been that of the anti-piracy initiative, Operation Copper. After increased pirate activity in the Mozambique Channel (a crucial import/export sea lane for South Africa), and subsequent requests for help from fellow Southern African Development Community (SADC) members (Mozambique and Tanzania), the navy has routinely deployed assets in an effort to provide maritime security in the region.

Since the operation first began, every Valour-class frigate has been deployed to the region on rotation, with the refurbished Warrior-class OPVs also being utilised. In 2012, the replenishment ship SAS Drakensberg was likewise deployed to the region, and alongside European warships, successfully captured seven Somail pirates. Elements of the Navy's Maritime Reaction Squadron (MRS) are routinely embarked on deployed warships so as to give the ability to board suspect vessels.

Gaps in deployment have previously occurred as a result of mechanical issues, as well as the South African Air Force withdrawing C-47TP maritime patrol aircraft in 2016 from Mozambique due to maintenance problems and lack of sufficient aircrew. In 2018 the SA Navy notably deployed two warships simultaneously for Operation Copper, and were independent of foreign support.

Piracy, and other maritime crime, has fallen substantially in the Mozambique Channel since the SADC operation began in 2011. Due to the success of the operation, expenditure for the future 2021/22 deployment is estimated to be R38.9 million, down from R154 million the previous year.

Operation Copper's mandate could be subject to official change as a result of increasing Islamist violence in the Cabo Delgado province of Mozambique. On 9 August 2021, the SADC formally announced the deployment of troops into the troubled province. Alongside regional partners such as Botswana, Tanzania and Zimbabwe, the South African government has informed parliament that it intends to deploy 1,495 personnel to Mozambique. SAS Makhanda, a modernised Warrior-class patrol OPV, has reportedly been seen in Pemba, the capital of Cabo Delgado province.

==== Operation Corona ====
For the continued safeguarding of South Africa's borders, Operation Corona aims to combat illegal fishing, poaching, and smuggling within its territorial waters. The SA Navy plans to carry out five maritime patrols in line with Operation Corona, with 84 days of surface and 22 days of subsurface patrols allocated for the financial year 2020/21. Deploying to known hotspot areas, the SA Navy works alongside other Government departments such as the SA Police Service and Department of Environment, Forestry and Fisheries, in an effort to deter rather than arrest.

==== Relationship with Russian and Chinese Navies ====
In February 2023, the South African Navy planned to engage in joint exercises with the Chinese and Russian navies that were to be held in waters off South Africa. The exercises, which were highly controversial given Russia's invasion of Ukraine, followed on a January 2023 visit by the Russian foreign minister Sergei Lavrov to Pretoria for meetings with his South African counterpart. Although the exercises were similar to exercises held in previous years, some suggested that they signalled a significant shift in South African policy toward more overt military engagement with China and Russia. The exercise began on 18 February and involved the frigate Admiral Gorshkov and the tanker Kama from the Russian Navy along with the destroyer Huainan, the frigate Rizhao and the support ship Kekexilihu from the Chinese Navy. Several vessels from the South African Navy were expected to participate including the frigate Mendi as well as the Warrior-class patrol vessel King Sekhukhune I and the hydrographic survey vessel Protea.

In April of the same year, the Chinese surveillance ship Yuan Wang 5 docked at Cape Town, overlapping with the presence of the Iranian Navy vessels, Makran and Dena.

In September 2024 it was reported that the Russian training ship Smolnyy had docked in Cape Town for a port visit.

=== Naval bases ===
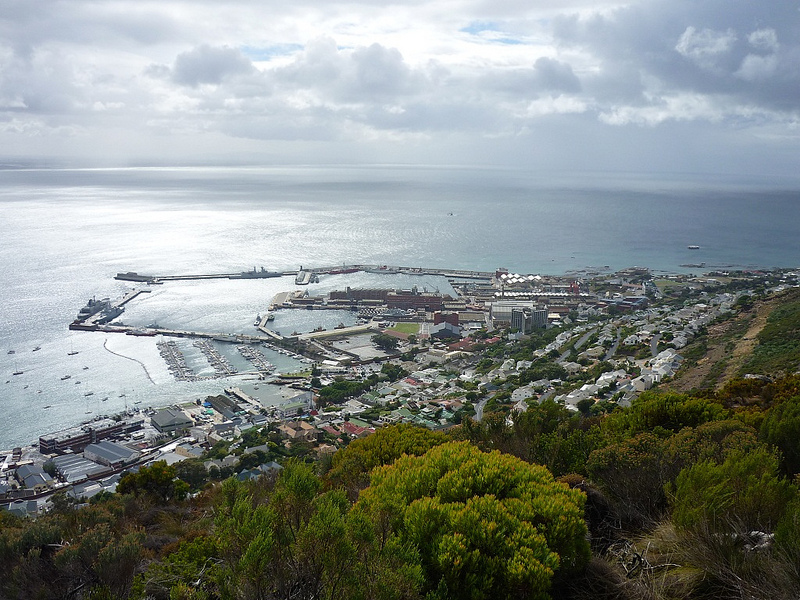
A view of Simon's Town and the naval base

The Navy operates the following Naval Bases:

- Naval Base Simon's Town – the largest and main naval base currently used by the South African Navy. Constructed by the Dutch East India Company in 1743, and later developed by the Royal Navy, the base was transferred to South Africa in 1957 as part of the Simon's Town Agreement and expanded in 1975. Simon's Town is the homeport of the frigate and submarine flotillas, as well as housing training facilities.
- Naval Base Durban – constructed during the Second World War to better serve the deployment of naval vessels off the eastern coast of Africa, particularly after the Japanese declaration of war in 1941. In 2002 Durban was downgraded to a Naval Station with much of the infrastructure being taken over by the Army and later abandoned. In 2012, the decision was taken to renovate and expand the facilities. However, it was announced in 2020 that due to budget constraints, the reclassification of Durban as a fully operational Naval Base would be delayed. The station is currently home to the fleet's offshore patrol flotilla and will continue to be so after the delivery of replacement offshore/inshore vessels.
- Naval Station Port Elizabeth – provides support to the fleet and host to visiting ships, however no major vessels are based here.

=== Training units ===
- SAS Saldanha – located on the West Coast and provides training and development for ratings.
- SAS Wingfield – located in the Greater Cape Town area. Historically provided practical training for apprentices, but now offers training to both ratings and officers.
- SAS Simonsberg – located in Simon's Town and provides training in gunnery, anti-submarine warfare, communications, diving and seamanship. Simonsberg also includes:
  - Maritime Warfare Training Centre.
  - Submarine Training Centre, East Yard.
  - Nuclear, Biological, Chemical, Damage Control Training Centre.
  - Military Training Centre, West Yard.
- South African Naval College – located in Gordon's Bay, the establishment provides training for naval officers.

=== Personnel ===
As of the end of the financial year 2018/19, there were approximately 6,816 active uniformed members of the SA Navy, just short of the 7,071 target. In addition, there are a further 1,071 civilian staff that further support the Navy.

In 2006, the old Naval Reserve Units that were modelled on the Royal Naval Reserve system were closed down. A new Navy Reserve system was created consisting of roughly 1,000 reserve posts. These posts are pooled and members are drawn from them as needed to augment full-time units and ships' companies.

==== Uniforms ====
From 1922 to the 1940s the SA Navy was effectively an extension of the Royal Navy, and therefore wore the same uniforms and similar insignia. As British influence was gradually curtailed, in 1959 the British Crown in the SA Navy cap badge was replaced with the Lion of Nassau from the crest of the country's coat of arms. A black beret later replaced the peaked cap in working uniforms.

In 2000 the new Coat of Arms was unveiled and the Chief of the Navy tasked Fleet Command to look at revising the Navy uniforms to reflect the new coat of arms. This saw new rank insignia for non-commissioned officers being implemented as well as the introduction of a side cap.

=== Ranks ===
Due to historical influence, the rank system is based on that of the Royal Navy.

==== Commissioned officer ranks ====
The rank insignia of commissioned officers.

Rank group	General / flag officers				Senior officers			Junior officers
South African Navy
South African Navy	Admiral	Vice admiral	Rear admiral	Rear admiral (junior grade)	Captain	Commander	Lieutenant commander	Lieutenant	Sub lieutenant	Ensign

==== Other ranks ====
The rank insignia of non-commissioned officers and enlisted personnel.

Rank group	Senior NCOs				Junior NCOs	Enlisted
South African Navy
South African Navy	Warrant officer class 1	Warrant officer class 2	Chief petty officer	Petty officer	Leading seaman	Able seaman	Seaman

=== Naval ensign ===
Ensigns of the South African Navy
1922–1946

1946–1951

1951–1952

1952–1959

1959–1981

1981–1994

27 April 1994 – 11 November 1994

1994–present

=== Naval jack ===
Jacks of the South African Navy
1922–1928

1928–1981

1981–1994

1994–present

== Gallery ==
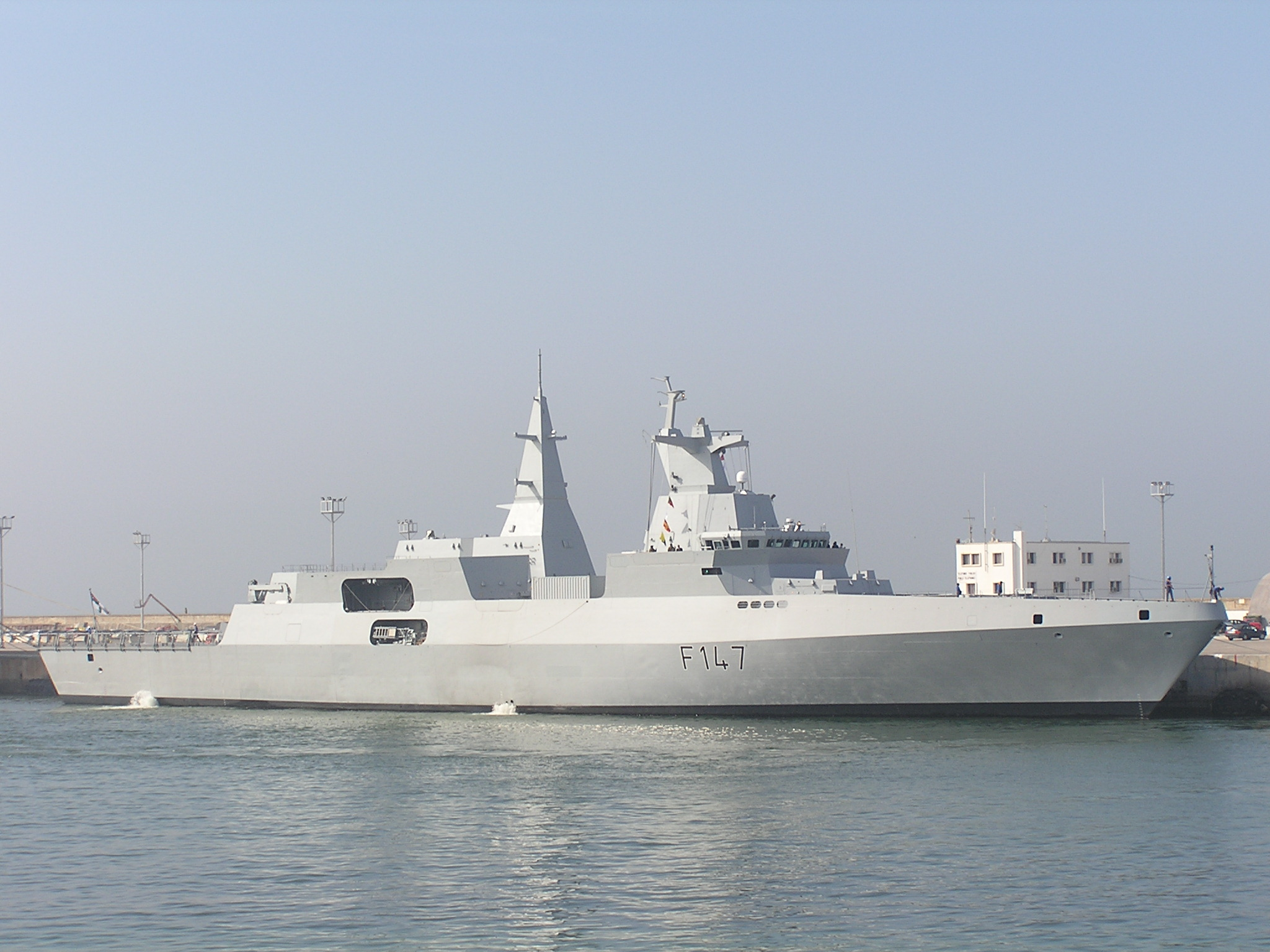

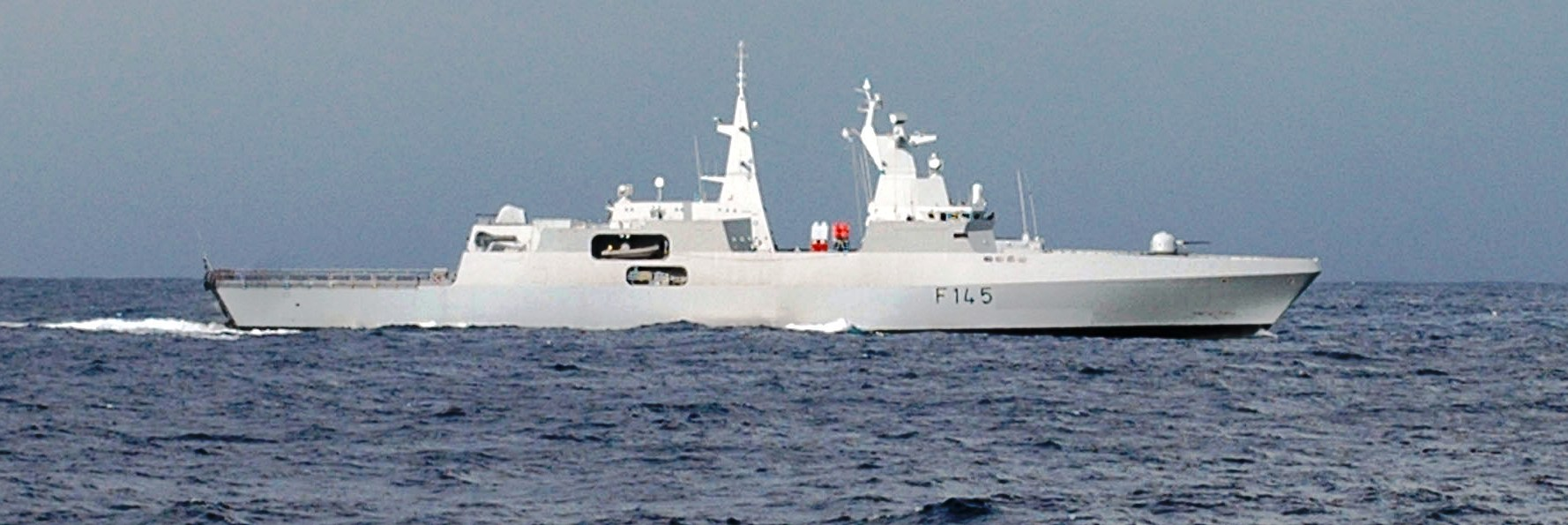

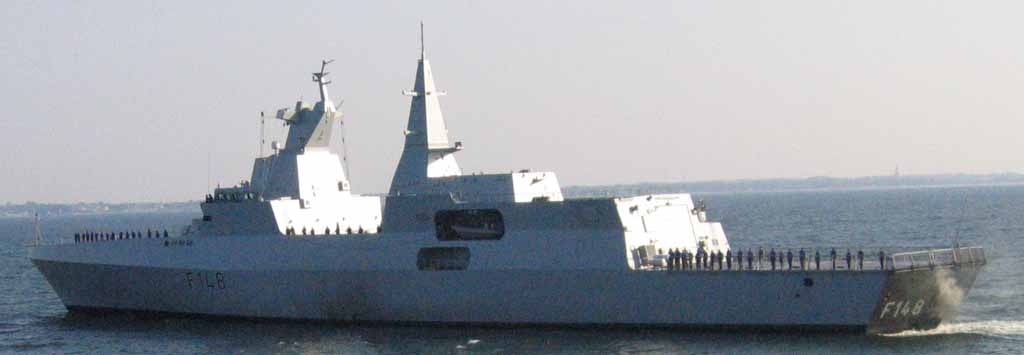

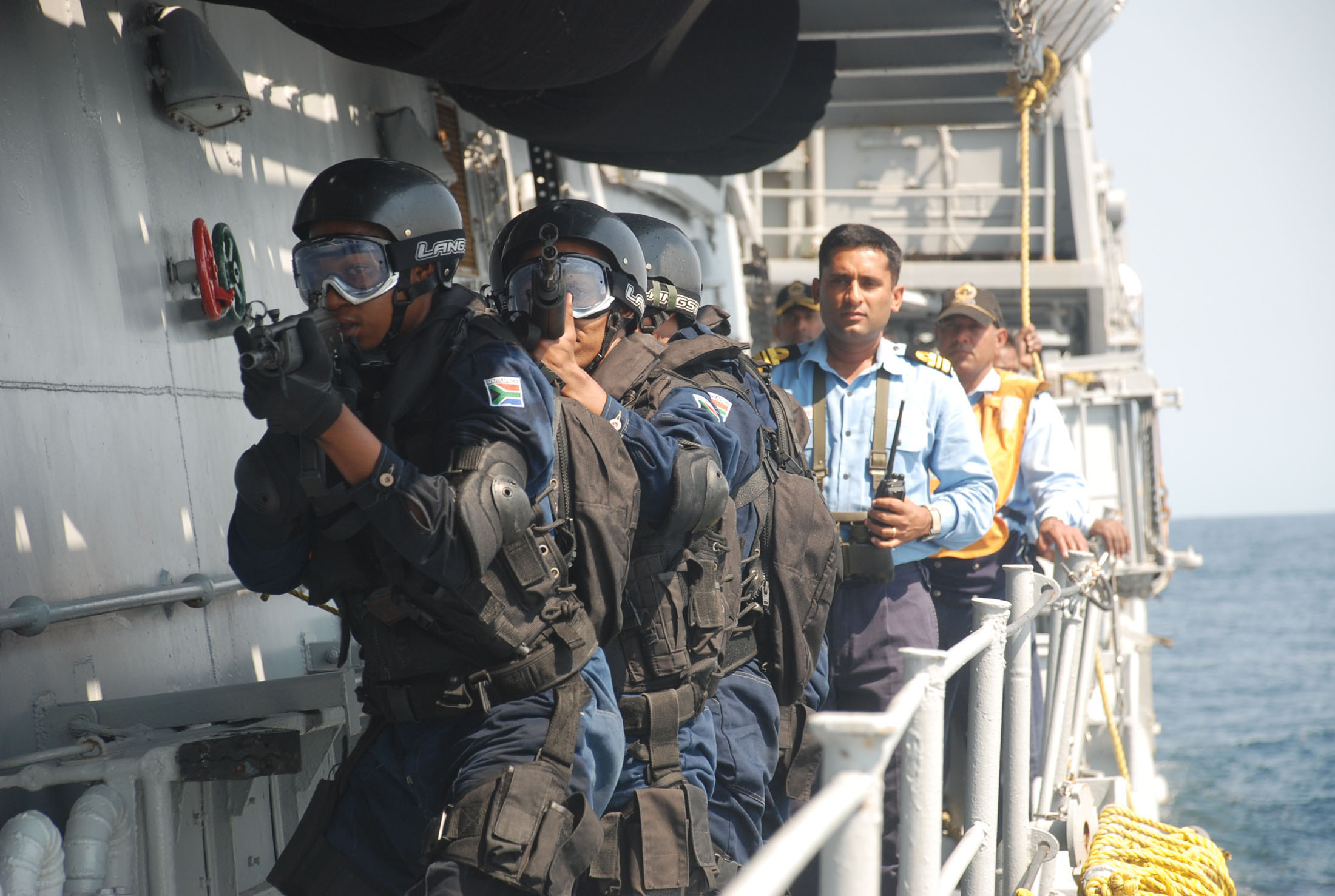

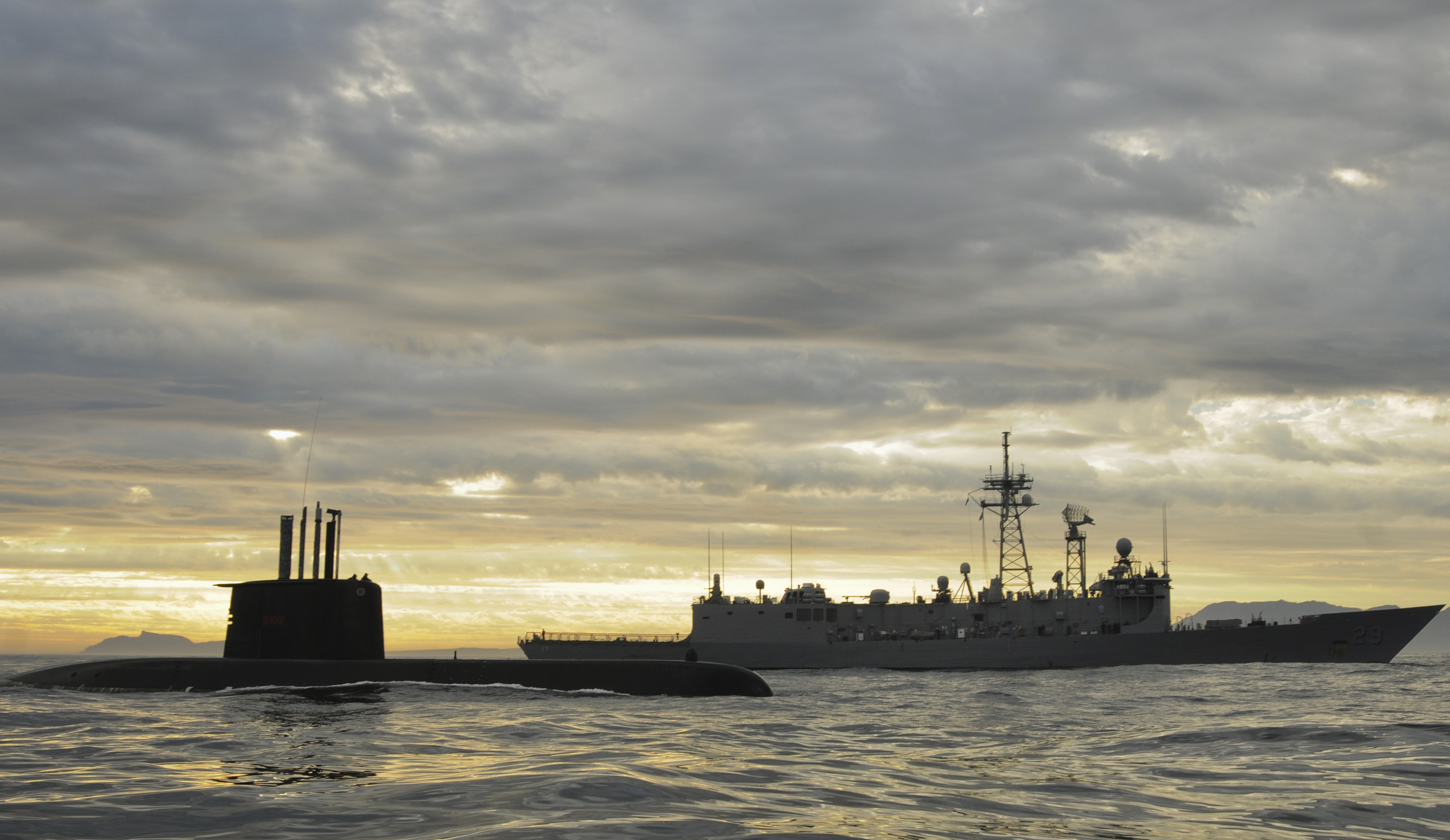

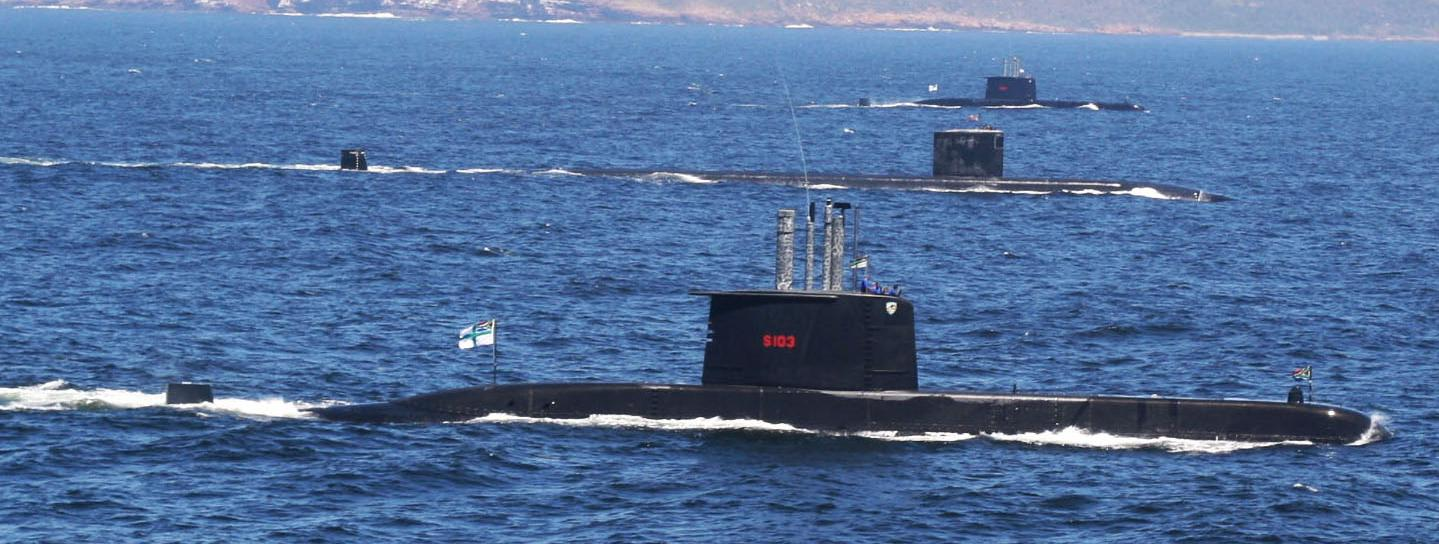

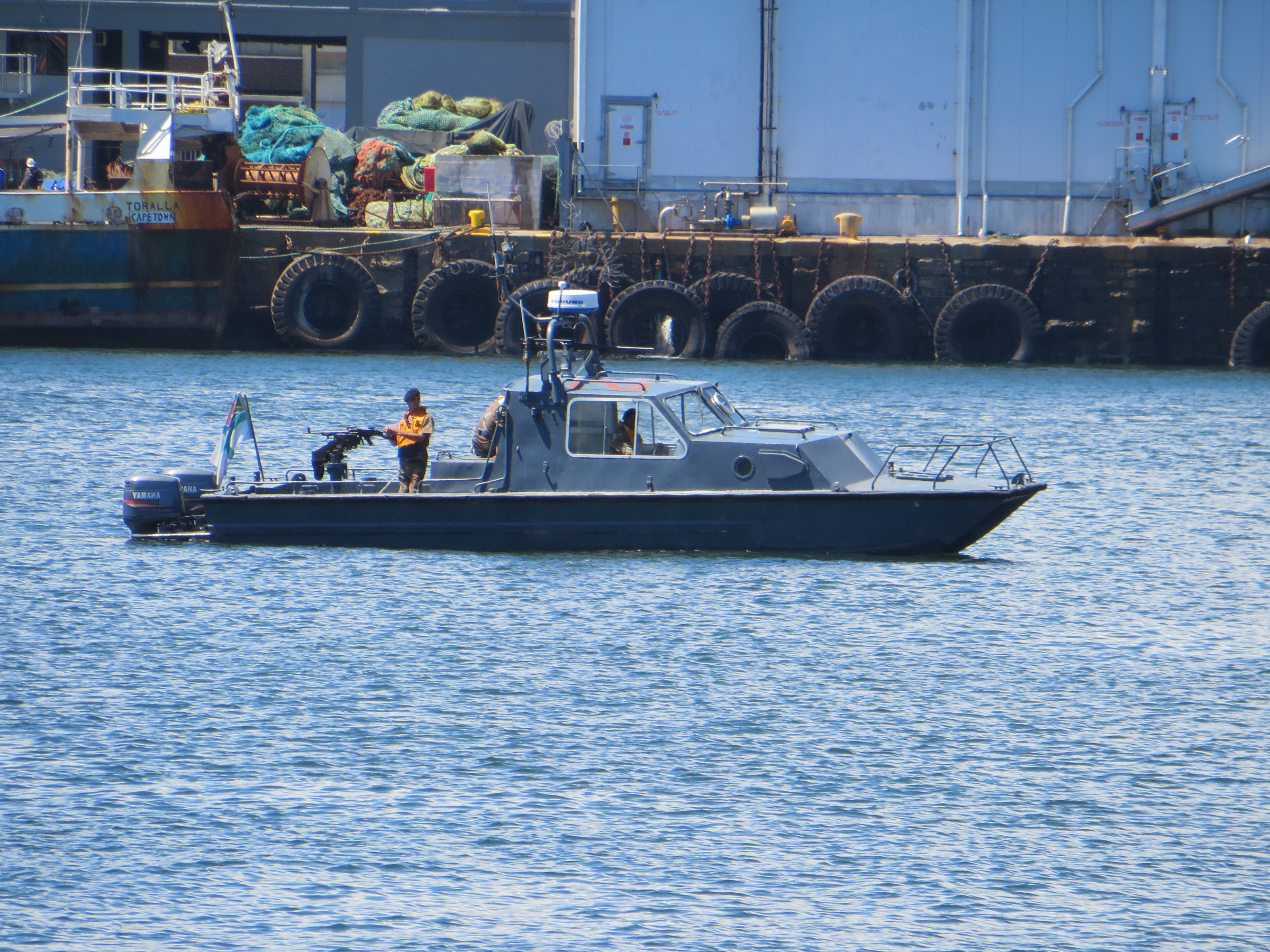

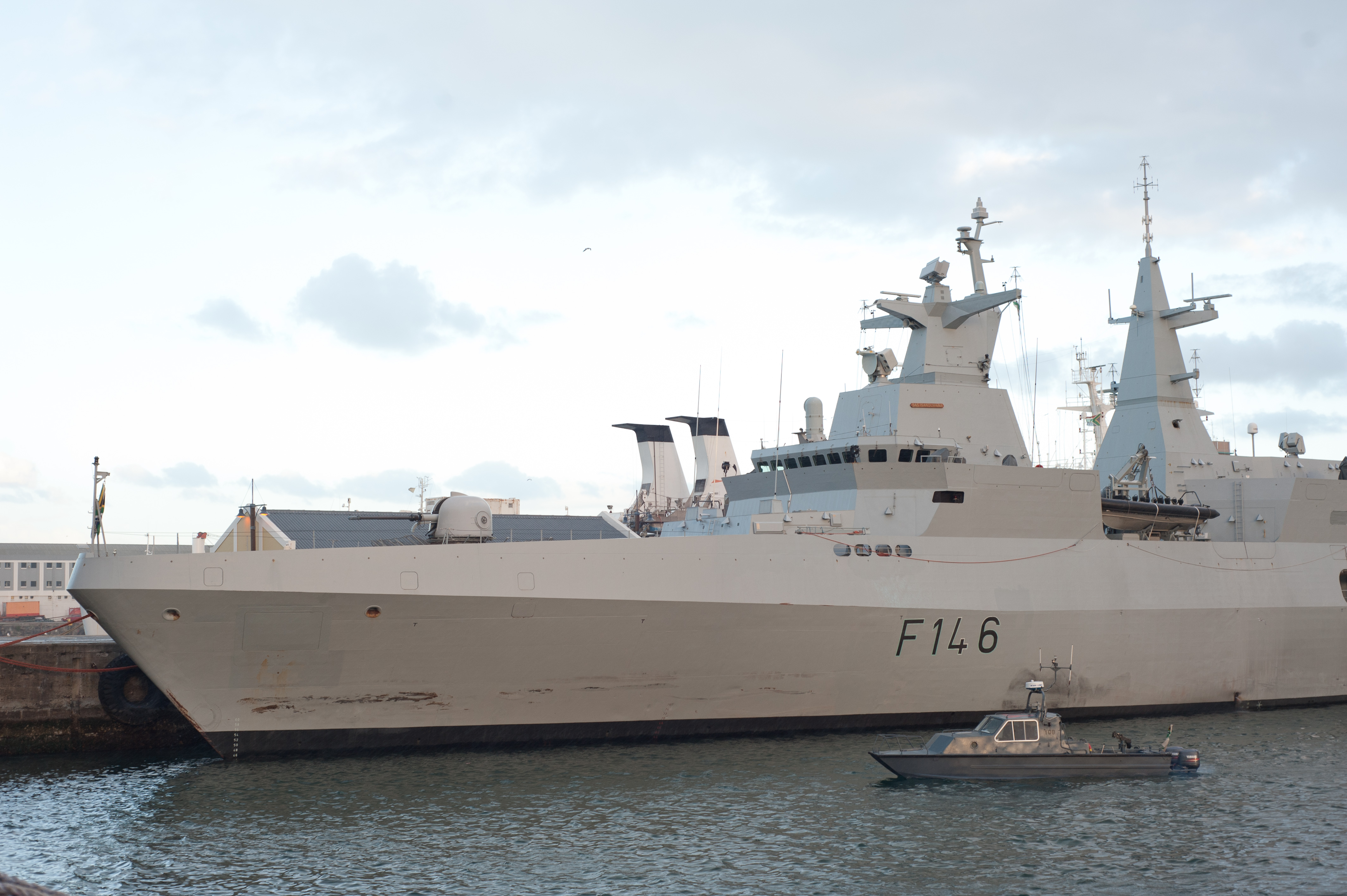

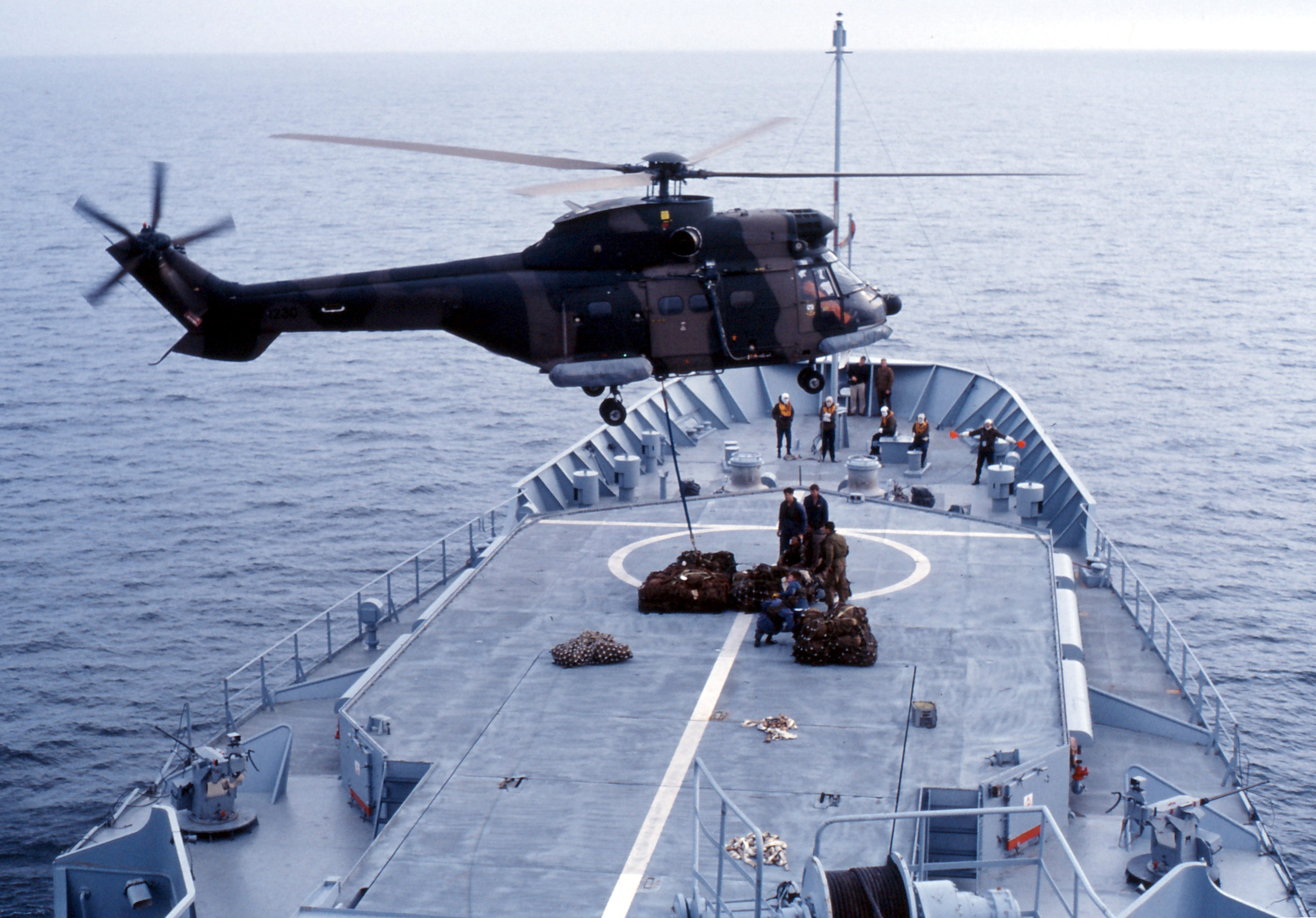

== See also ==
- List of South African military chiefs
- Military history of South Africa
- South African environmental patrol vessels
- South African Naval Museum
