= SAS Charlotte Maxeke =

Heroine-class submarine

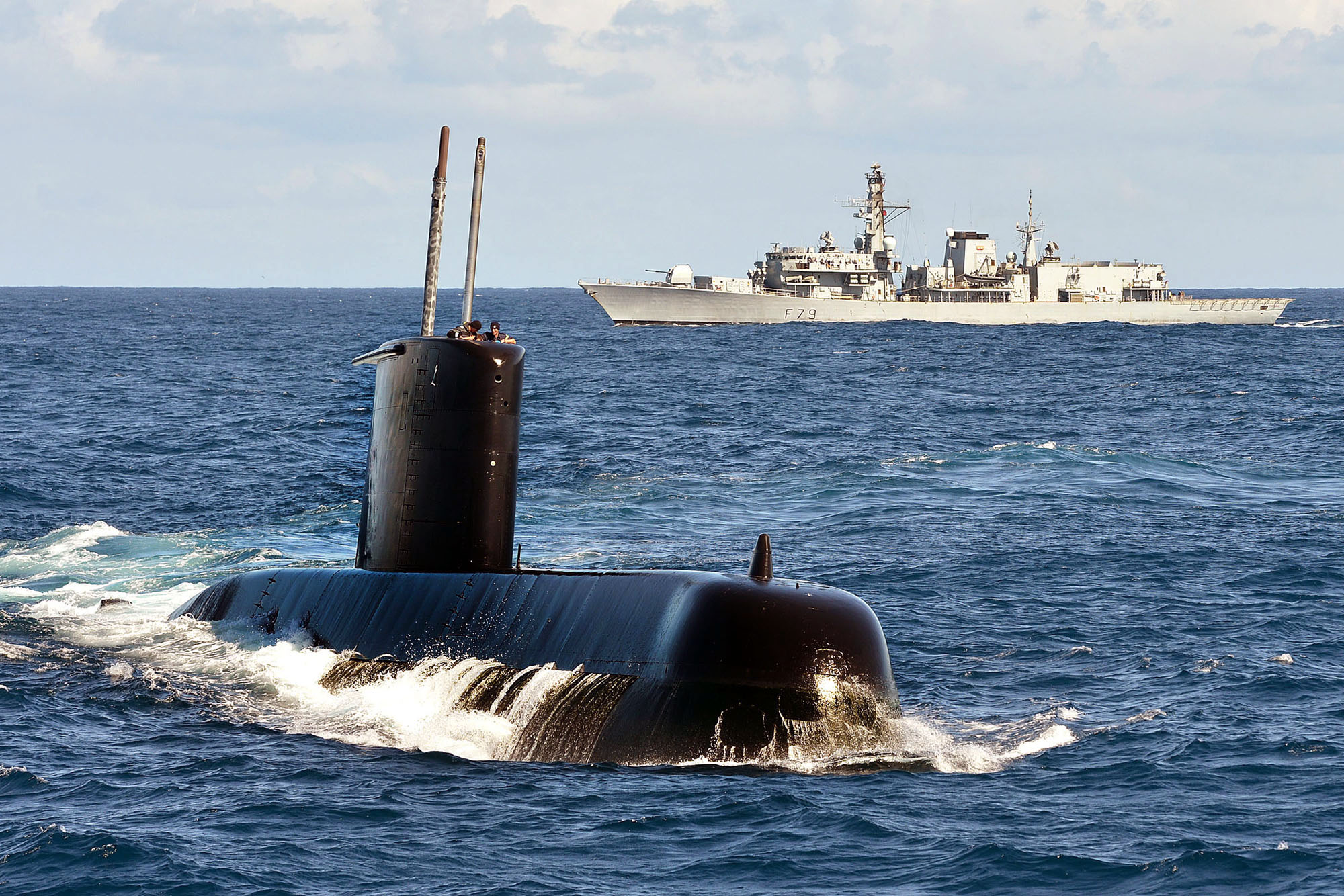
- On exercise with British frigate HMS Portland in 2014

History

South Africa
- Name: SAS Charlotte Maxeke
- Namesake: Charlotte Maxeke, a South African religious leader and political activist
- Operator: South African Navy
- Builder: Howaldtswerke-Deutsche Werft, Kiel
- Launched: 4 May 2005
- Commissioned: 14 March 2007
- Status: in active service

General characteristics
- Class & type: Heroine-class submarine
- Displacement: 1,454 t, submerged
- Length: 62 m (203 ft)
- Beam: 7.6 m (25 ft)
- Draft: 5.8 m (19 ft)
- Propulsion: Diesel-electric, 4 diesels, 1 shaft, 6,100 shp (4,500 kW)
- Speed: 10 knots (19 km/h), surfaced; 21.5 knots (40 km/h), submerged
- Range: 11,000 nmi (20,000 km; 13,000 mi) at 10 kn (19 km/h; 12 mph), surfaced, 8,000 nmi (15,000 km; 9,200 mi) at 10 kn (19 km/h; 12 mph), snorkeling, 400 nmi (740 km; 460 mi) at 4 kn (7.4 km/h; 4.6 mph), submerged
- Test depth: 500 m (1,600 ft)
- Complement: 30
- Sensors & processing systems: Sonar: STN Atlas CSU-90; hull mounted and flank arrays; Radar: Surface search I-band; Optics: Zeiss non-hull penetrating optronic mast
- Electronic warfare & decoys: ESM: Grintek Avitronics, intercept + radar warning receiver; ELINT: Saab S/UME-100 tactical electronic support measures
- Armament: 8 × 21-inch (533 mm) torpedo tubes, 14 AEG SUT 264 torpedoes; optional UGM-84 Harpoon integration

SAS Charlotte Maxeke (S102) is a Heroine-class submarine, a variant of the Type 209 diesel-electric attack submarine developed by Howaldtswerke-Deutsche Werft (HDW) of Germany, currently in service with the South African Navy. She is named after Charlotte Maxeke, a South African religious leader and political activist.

The sponsor of S102, Mrs. Mittah Seperepere named the submarine at a ceremony in Emden, Germany on 14 March 2007.

== Background ==
South Africa placed a contract for three Type 209/1400 submarines in July 2000 on Howaldtswerke-Deutsche Werft (HDW) and Thyssen Nordseewerke. The Type 209/1400 submarines replaced the French-built Daphné-class submarines, SAS Spear, SAS Assegaai and SAS Umkhonto which were decommissioned in 2003. The Heroine class are sometimes considered to be South Africa's first "true" submarines, as they were more suited to being underwater than the Daphné models.

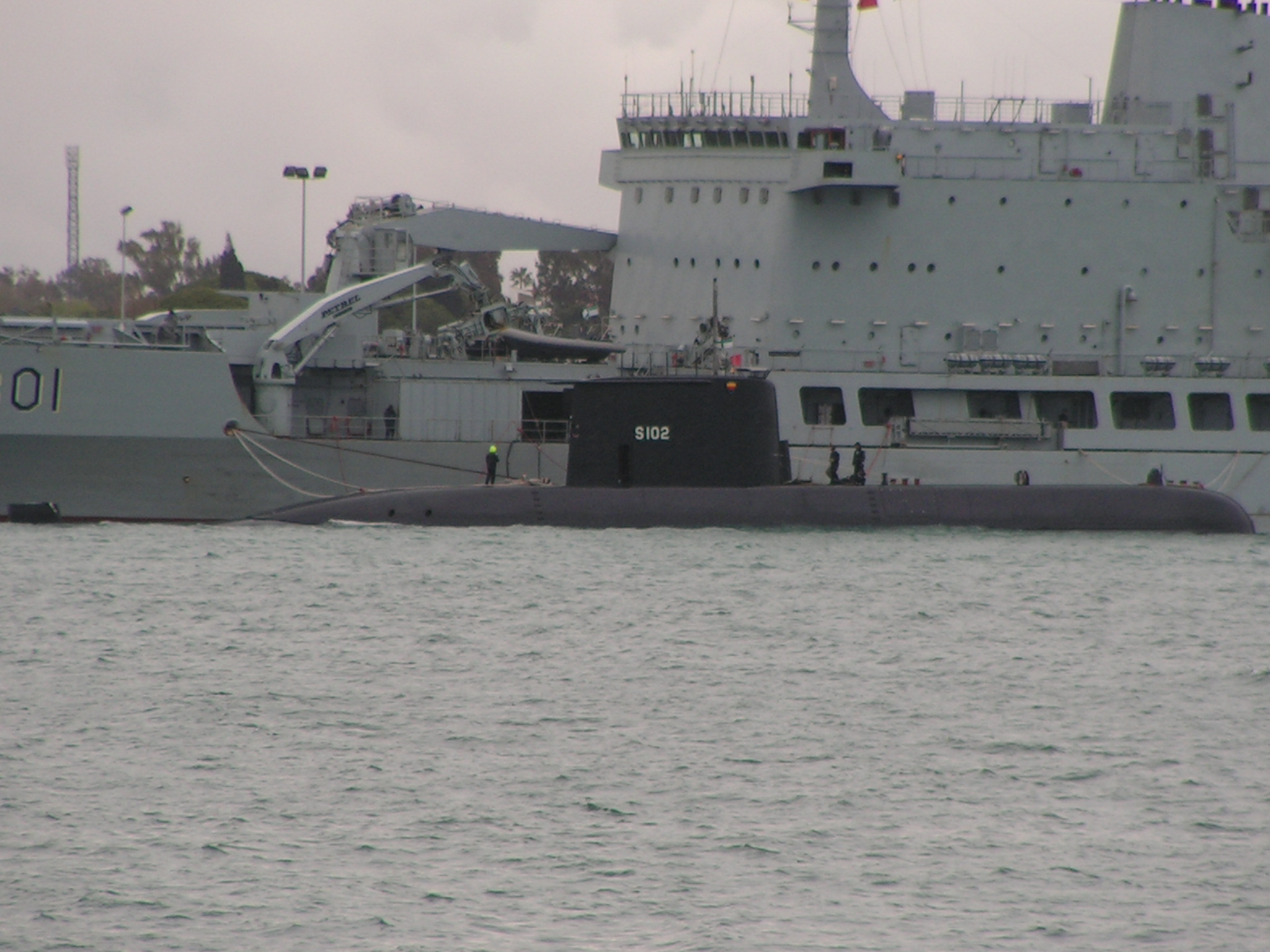
SAS Charlotte Maxeke in 2007

Charlotte Maxeke arrived in Simon's Town on 7 April 2006.

As of 2021, Charlotte Maxeke was being refitted at the Armscor Dockyard. Funding in the amount of R189 million had reportedly been made available to ensure the completion of the refit during the 2023/24 financial year.

== Deployments ==
- ATLASUR VIII - 2010 - exercises between the Brazilian, Argentinean, Uruguayan and South African defence forces.

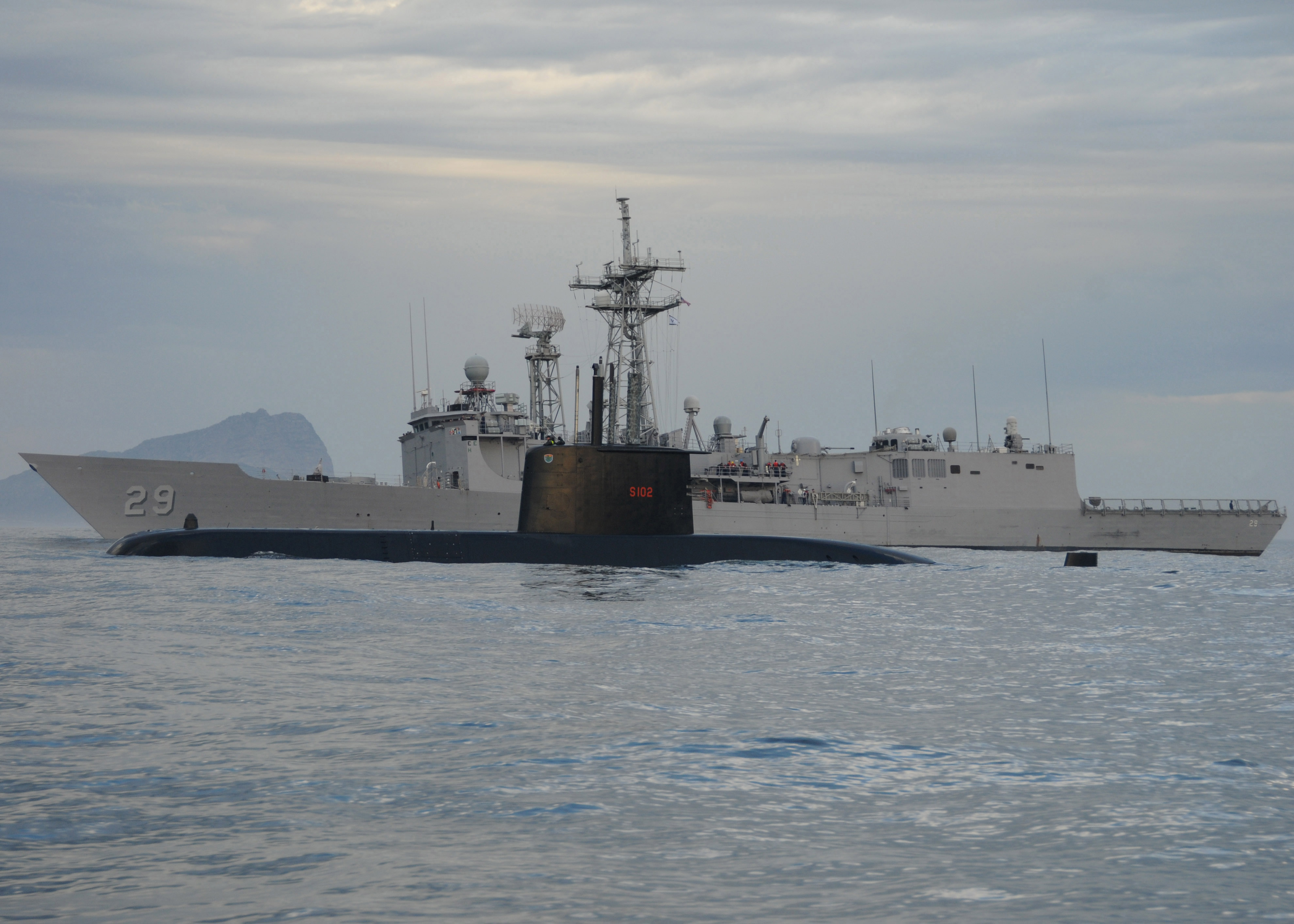
The frigate USS Stephen W. Groves participates in exercises with the SAS Charlotte Maxeke
