= Heroine-class submarine =

Variant of the German Type 209 diesel-electric attack submarine (commissioned 2005)

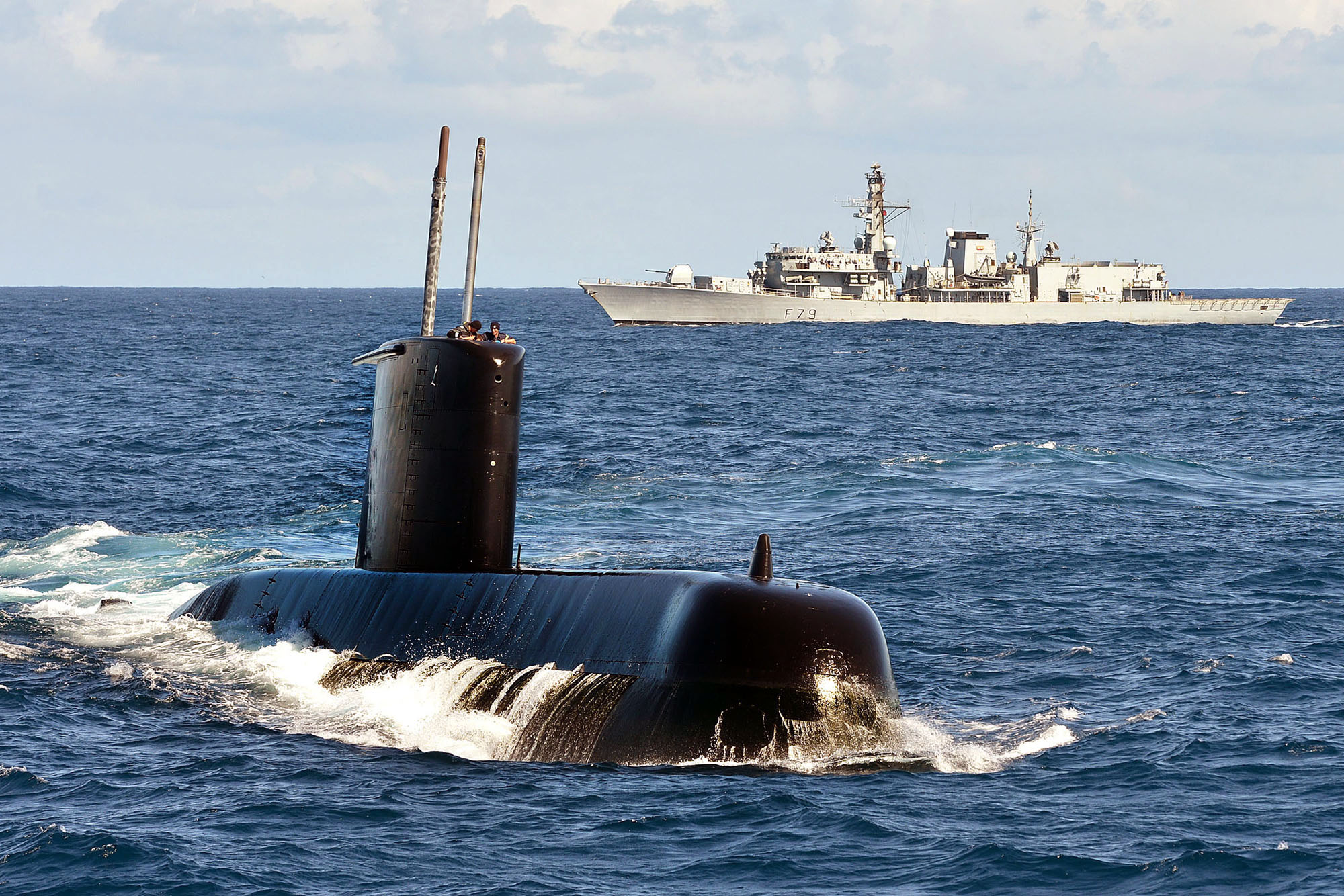
- SAS Charlotte Maxeke

Class overview
- Name: Heroine class
- Builders: Howaldtswerke-Deutsche Werft
- Operators: South African Navy
- Preceded by: Daphné class
- Built: 2001–2007
- In commission: 2005–present
- Completed: 3
- Active: 3

General characteristics
- Type: Type 209/1400 submarine
- Displacement: 1,454 t (1,431 long tons) submerged
- Length: 62 m (203 ft 5 in)
- Beam: 7.6 m (24 ft 11 in)
- Draft: 5.8 m (19 ft 0 in)
- Propulsion: Diesel-electric, 4 diesels, 1 shaft, 6,100 shp (4,500 kW)
- Speed: 10 knots (19 km/h; 12 mph), surfaced; 21.5 knots (39.8 km/h; 24.7 mph), submerged
- Range: 11,000 nmi (20,000 km; 13,000 mi) at 10 knots surfaced; 8,000 nmi (15,000 km; 9,200 mi) at 10 knots snorkeling; 400 nmi (740 km; 460 mi) at 4 knots (7.4 km/h; 4.6 mph) submerged
- Test depth: 500 m (1,600 ft)
- Complement: 30
- Sensors & processing systems: Sonar: STN Atlas CSU-90; hull mounted and flank arrays; Radar: Surface search I-band; Optics: Zeiss non-hull penetrating optronic mast
- Electronic warfare & decoys: ESM: Grintek Avitronics, intercept + radar warning receiver; ELINT: Saab S/UME-100 tactical electronic support measures
- Armament: 8 × 21 in (533 mm) torpedo tubes, 14 AEG SUT 264 torpedoes; optional UGM-84 Harpoon integration

The Heroine class are a variant of the Type 209 diesel-electric attack submarine developed by Howaldtswerke-Deutsche Werft (HDW) of Germany, currently in service with the South African Navy. The class is composed of three vessels.

== Background ==
South Africa placed a contract for three Type 209 1400-Mod submarines in July 2000 on Howaldtswerke-Deutsche Werft (HDW) and Thyssen Nordseewerke. The Type 209 1400-Mod boats displace 1,450t surfaced and 1,600t dived. The Type 209 1400-Mod submarines replace the French-built Daphné-class submarines, SAS Spear, SAS Assegaai and SAS Umkhonto which were decommissioned in 2003.

The first submarine, Manthatisi, was built by Howaldtswerke at Kiel. It was launched in June 2004 and commissioned in November 2005. The second and third submarines were built by Thyssen Nordseewerke in Emden. Charlotte Maxeke was launched in May 2005 and commissioned in March 2007. The third submarine, Queen Modjadji, was launched in 2006 and handed over in February 2008.

The submarines' homeport is Simon's Town naval base near Cape Town.

As of 2019, two of the submarines were reported to be in need of "urgent and complete" refits. The recommended approach was to move to a contracting phase in 2020. The Armscor annual report to parliament indicated that should the refits not take place, the submarine capability would not available after FY2022/23. As of March 2021, the contracting phase had still not been initiated and no dates had been announced for any upgrades of the submarines.

In August 2021 it was reported that Charlotte Maxeke was being refitted at the Armscor Dockyard. Funding in the amount of R189 million had reportedly been made available to ensure the completion of the refit during the 2023/24 financial year. Funding for the refit of Queen Modjadji was not available, though the reported focus of the Navy was to prioritise essential maintenance and repair of SAS Manthatisi (which had been last refitted during 2013/14) to ensure "expedited operational availability." As of April 2023, Manthatisi had completed a Docking and Essential Defect (DED) maintenance period and was undergoing post-maintenance trials. Queen Modjadji was undergoing preservation and pre-refit planning activities, in preparation for a refit.

=== Naming ===
The submarines are named after powerful South African women. Manthatisi is named after the female warrior chief of the Batlokwa tribe. Charlotte Maxeke is named after the female political activist Charlotte Maxeke, who campaigned for equality in the early 20th century. Queen Modjadji is named after the South African Rain Queen.

== Submarines in class ==
Prefix	Ship name	Pennant no.	Laid down	Launched	Commissioned	Status
SAS	Manthatisi	S101	May 22, 2001	June 15, 2004	November 3, 2005	Active
SAS	Charlotte Maxeke	S102	November 12, 2003	May 4, 2005	March 14, 2007	Active
SAS	Queen Modjadji	S103	November 11, 2004	October 31, 2007	March 14, 2007	Active (non-operational, awaiting refit as of 2023)

== Characteristics ==
=== Performance ===
The submarine has a crew of 30. The hull has a length of 62m, breadth of 7.6m and height of 5.8m. It has an approximate maximum diving depth of 500 meters.

The Type 209/1400 submarine has a maximum speed of 10 kn (19 km/h) surfaced and 22 kn (41 km/h) dived.

=== Command and control ===
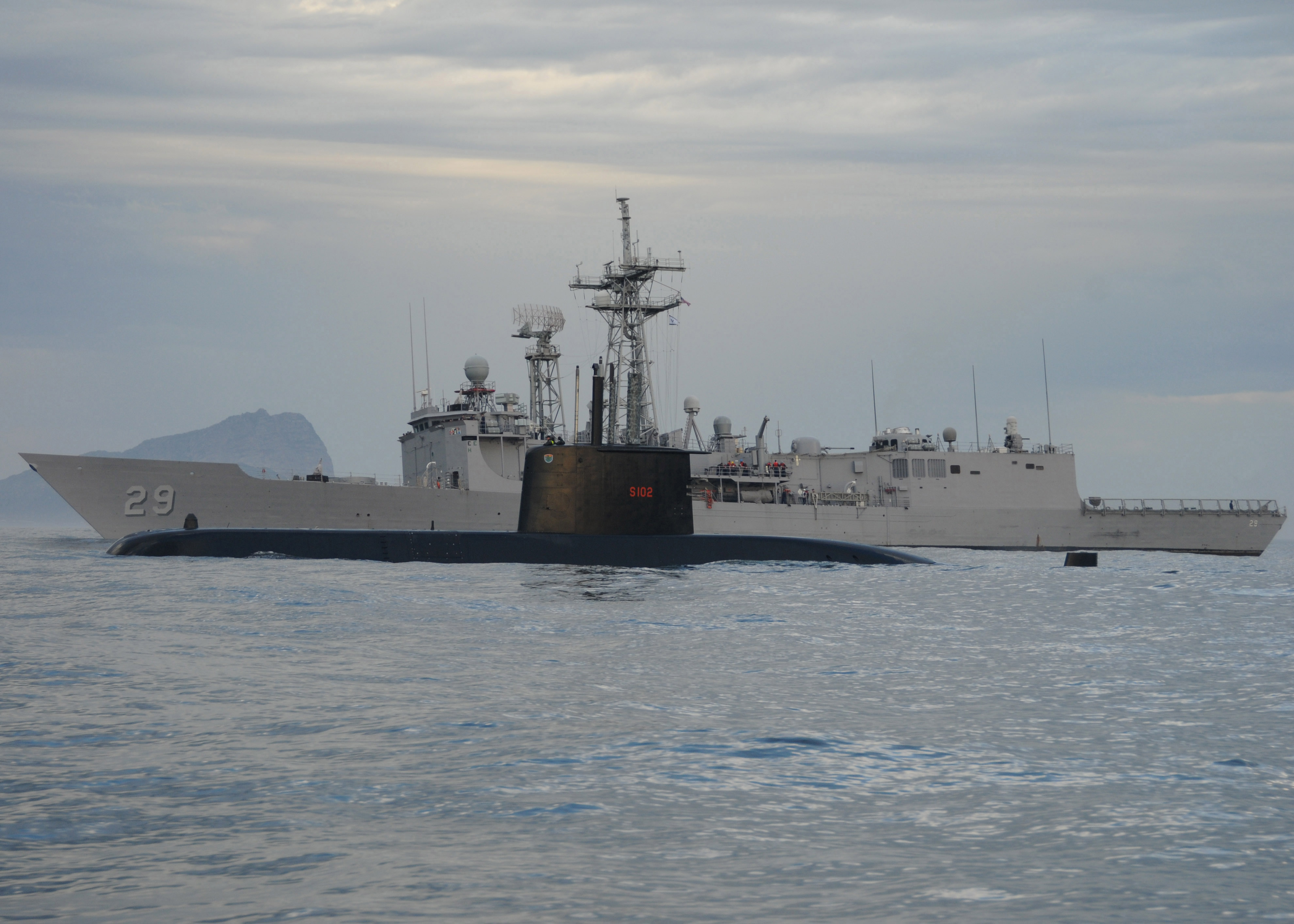
SAS Charlotte Maxeke participating in joint United States and South African Naval exercises

The Atlas Elektronik ISUS 90-45 integrated combat information system provides navigation, automatic sensor integration and management as well as fire control functions for the submarine.

=== Weapons ===
There are eight 533 mm bow torpedo tubes and the submarine can carry up to 14 torpedoes. The SA Navy have acquired Atlas Elektronik SUT torpedoes for these submarines.

=== Sensors ===
Optical

The submarine is fitted with two periscopes, a conventional, hull-penetrating SERO 400 attack periscope and a non-hull-penetrating OMS 100 optronic mast (search periscope), both supplied by Carl Zeiss (now Cassidian) Optronics.

The OMS-100 mast integrates an optronic sensor with a high-definition resolution colour TV camera and third generation thermal imager. The cameras are gyroscopically stabilised in elevation and azimuth. The sensor assembly is installed in a retractable unit outside the pressure hull of the submarine. The observation and operation of the mast are controlled on a console. The optronics mast system contains fully automatic functions for very fast surveillance and observation so the period of mast exposure above the surface is extremely short.

Radar

The surface search radar operates at I-band.

Sonar

The Atlas Elektronik CSU 90 sonar suite includes hull-mounted passive and active search-and-attack, flank array and active intercept sonar arrays, as well as an own noise monitoring system. South Africa did not exercise the option of purchasing a 'clip-on' towed array sonar based on advice from existing users that the system is clumsy and would prove impractical in South Africa's envisaged operational context.

ESM/ELINT

The submarine is equipped with a Saab Grintek Avionics UME-100 ESM/Designated ELINT system. The antennae for the system are integrated into the mastheads of both the SERO 400 and OMS-100 periscopes.

The submarine's ELINT electronic intelligence system is the Saab S/UME-100 tactical electronic support measures which provides electronic intelligence analysis and amplitude direction finding capability.

The S/UME-100 comprises the ESM antenna, the radar warning receiver antenna, a signal distribution unit and an electronic warfare controller.

The S/UME-100 tactical ESM antennas interface to the optronics mast and attack periscope.

=== Countermeasures ===
It is believed that the submarines are fitted with the CIRCE torpedo counter-measure ejector system.

=== Propulsion ===
The submarines are fitted with a diesel electric propulsion system based on four MTU 12V 396 diesel engines delivering 2.8MW, with four alternators and one Siemens 3.7MW motor, driving a single shaft.

== Allegations of bribery ==
In 2008, the Sunday Times reported that Ferrostaal allegedly gave former president Thabo Mbeki R30 million in bribes, some of which was allegedly shared with former president Jacob Zuma. An internal audit of Ferrostaal by American-based law firm Debevoise and Plimpton, who was hired after the German Public Prosecutions Authority arrested of one of its board members in 2010, reportedly places the amount paid in bribes at R300 million, or over $40 million. The report was not publicly released, but Germany's Süddeutsche Zeitung reported that it had obtained a copy.

== Service history ==
The submarines of the Heroine class are primarily used to patrol and detect illegal fishermen in the territorial waters of South Africa.

In August 2025, the Indian Navy undertook the Rescue Seat Certification of SAS Manthatisi. This follows the "rescue cooperation pact" signed between Indian Navy Chief Admiral Dinesh K Tripathi and South African Navy Chief Vice Admiral Monde Lobese on 3 September 2024 which allows India to deploy its Deep Submergence Rescue Vessel (DSRV) for assistance in case a South African Navy Submarine experiences an emergency. An Indian Navy team visited Simon's Town and held talks with multiple talks South African stakeholders before the certification.

== See also ==
- List of submarine classes in service

Equivalent submarines of the same era

- Dolphin class
- Gotland class
- Scorpène class
- Lada class
- Type 214
