= SAS Queen Modjadji =

Heroine-class submarine

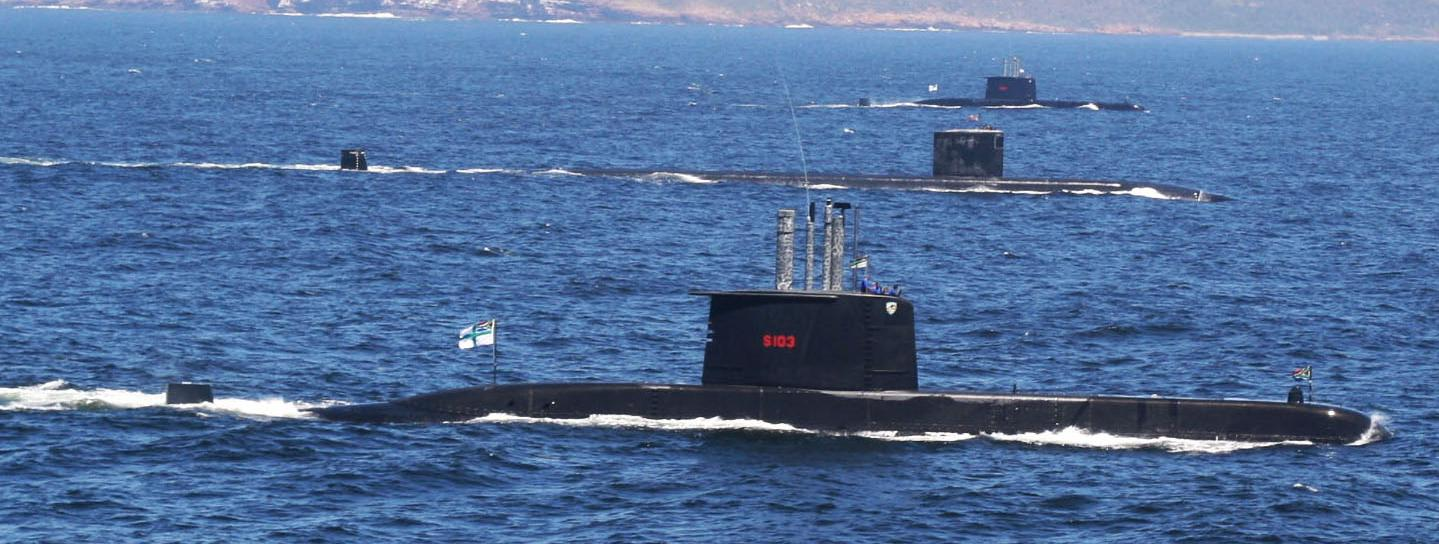

History

South Africa
- Name: SAS Queen Modjadji
- Namesake: A South African Rain Queen
- Builder: Nordsee Werke, Emden
- Launched: 18 March 2006
- Commissioned: 22 May 2008
- Identification: Pennant number S103
- Status: in active service (awaiting refit as of 2023)

General characteristics
- Type: Heroine-class submarine
- Displacement: 1,454 t (1,431 long tons), submerged
- Length: 62.0 m (203 ft 5 in)
- Beam: 7.6 m (24 ft 11 in)
- Draft: 5.8 m (19 ft 0 in)
- Propulsion: Diesel-electric, 4 diesels, 1 shaft, 6,100 shp (4,500 kW)
- Speed: 10 knots (19 km/h), surfaced; 21.5 knots (40 km/h), submerged
- Range: 11,000 nmi (20,000 km; 13,000 mi) at 10 kn (19 km/h) (surfaced,); 8,000 nmi (15,000 km; 9,200 mi) at 10 knots (snorkeling); 400 nmi (740 km; 460 mi) at 4 kn (7.4 km/h) (submerged)
- Test depth: 500 m (1,600 ft)
- Complement: 30
- Sensors & processing systems: Sonar: STN Atlas CSU-90; hull mounted and flank arrays Radar: Surface search I-band Optics: Zeiss non-hull penetrating optronic mast
- Electronic warfare & decoys: ESM: Grintek Avitronics, intercept + radar warning receiver ELINT: Saab S/UME-100 tactical electronic support measures
- Armament: 8 × 21 in (533 mm) torpedo tubes, 14 AEG SUT 264 torpedoes; optional UGM-84 Harpoon integration

SAS Queen Modjadji is a variant of the Type 209 diesel-electric attack submarine developed by Howaldtswerke-Deutsche Werft (HDW) of Germany, currently in service with the South African Navy. She was named after the South African Rain Queen on 14 March 2007 by the ship's sponsor, Mrs. Rita Ndzanga, at a ceremony in Emden, Germany.

== Background ==
South Africa placed a contract for three Type 209/1400 submarines in July 2000 on Howaldtswerke-Deutsche Werft (HDW) and Thyssen Nordseewerke. The Type 209/1400 submarines replace the French-built Daphné-class submarines, SAS Spear, SAS Assegaai and SAS Umkhonto which were decommissioned in 2003. The Heroine class are sometimes considered to be South Africa's first "true" submarines, as they were more suited to being underwater than the Daphné models.

== History ==
Queen Modjadji arrived in Simonstown on 22 May 2008.

Commander Handsome Thamsanqa Matsane became the first black officer to command a South African submarine when he took command of Queen Modjadji in April 2012. SAS Queen Modjadji was involved in an accident on the 17 July 2012 when the submarine hit the seabed during training. A 1.5-by-1.5-metre (4.9 ft × 4.9 ft) dent was made in the outer protective plating.

The submarine took part in the joint naval exercise Good Hope V between the South African Navy and the German Navy. The exercise also included the South African Air Force and took place in March 2012. The submarine participated in two further naval exercises in 2012; the multinational maritime exercise between the navies of South Africa, Argentina, Brazil and Uruguay, Atlasur IX between 24 September and 10 October 2012 and Exercise IBSAMAR III, a trilateral naval exercise between Brazil, India and South Africa from 10 to 26 October 2012.

As of August 2021, Queen Modjadji was said to be in urgent need of a refit but funding was not immediately available. The Department of Defence stated that plans for the refit of the submarine would be finalised "based on the availability of progressive funding to enable the phased commencement of [her] refit. The average cost of a submarine refit was reported to be R660 million, the department stated. As of April 2023, Queen Modjadji was undergoing preservation and pre-refit planning activities, in preparation for a refit.
