= Charlotte Maxeke =

South African religious leader and activist (1871?–1939)

Charlotte Maxeke OM RRC DStJ
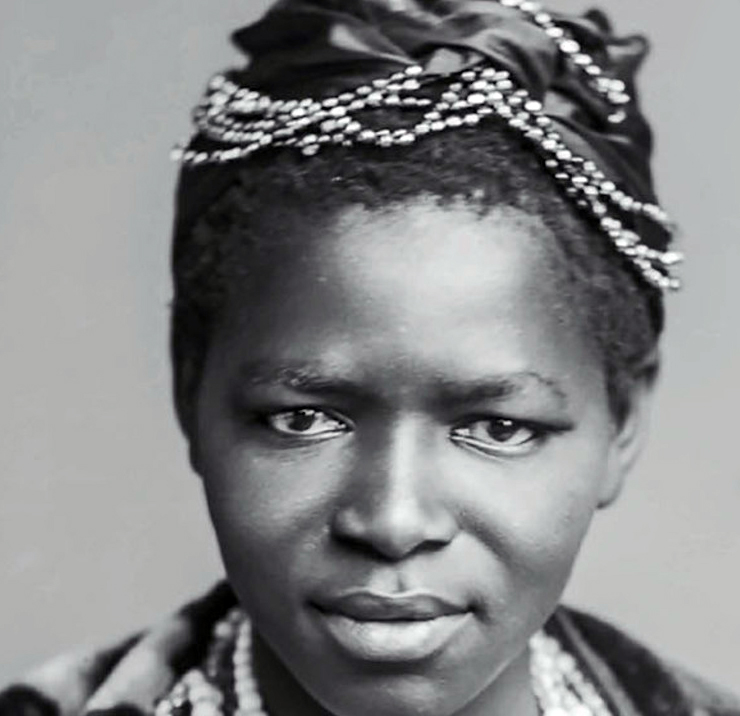
- Born: Charlotte Makgomo Mannya; 7 April 1871; Ga-Ramokgopa, Limpopo, South Africa
- Died: 16 October 1939 (aged 68)
- Education: Wilberforce University
- Occupations: Religious leader, social and political activist

Charlotte Makgomo (née Mannya) Maxeke (7 April 1871 – 16 October 1939) was a South African religious leader, social and political activist. By graduating with a B.Sc. from Wilberforce University, Ohio, in 1903, she became the first black woman in South Africa to graduate with a university degree as well as the first African woman to graduate from an American university.

== Early life ==
Charlotte Makgomo Mannya was born in Ga-Ramokgopa, Limpopo, South Africa, on 7 April 1871 and grew up in Fort Beaufort, Eastern Cape. She was the daughter of John Kgope Mannya, (the son of headman Modidima Mannya of the Batlokwa people, under Chief Mamafa Ramokgopa) and Anna Manci, a Xhosa woman from Fort Beaufort. Mannya's father was a roads foreman and Presbyterian lay preacher, and her mother was a teacher. Mannya's grandfather served as a key adviser to the king of the Basothos. Soon after her birth, Mannya's family moved to Fort Beaufort, where her father had gained employment at a road construction company. Details about Mannya's siblings are unclear, however, she had a sister known as Katie, who was born in Fort Beaufort. Mannya's date of birth is disputed, with possible dates ranging from 1871, 1872 to 1874. The former minister of Home Affairs of South Africa, Naledi Pandor, took special interest in this detail of Charlotte Maxeke's life, however, no records were found. The 1871 date is also often accepted as it does not conflict with the age of her younger sister Katie, who was born in 1873.

At the age of eight, Charlotte Mannya began her primary school classes at a missionary school taught by the Reverend Isaac Wauchope in Uitenhage. She excelled in Dutch and English, mathematics and music. She spent long hours tutoring her less skilled classmates, often with great success. Reverend Wauchope credited her with much of his teaching success particularly with regard to languages. Her musical prowess was visible at a young age. Describing Charlotte's singing Rev. Henry Reed Ngcayiya, a minister of the United Church and family friend said: "She had the voice of an angel in heaven."

From Uitenhage, Charlotte moved to Port Elizabeth to study at the Edward Memorial School under Headmaster Paul Xiniwe. She excelled and completed her secondary school education in record time, achieving the highest possible grades. In 1885, after the discovery of diamonds, Charlotte moved to Kimberley, Northern Cape, with her family.

== Foreign travel ==
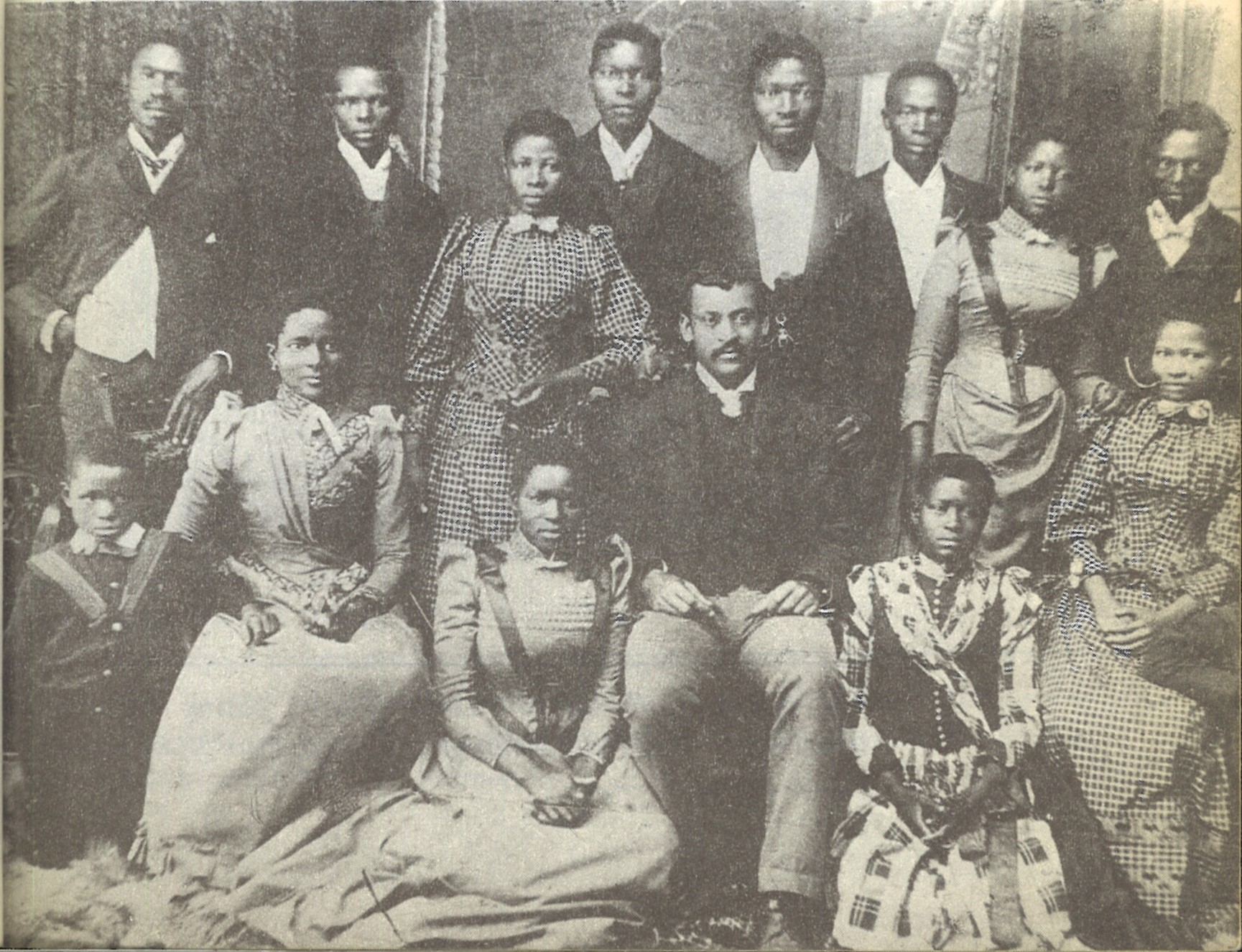
Maxeke with African Choir that toured the USA

After arriving in Kimberley in 1885, Charlotte began teaching fundamentals of indigenous languages to expatriates, and of basic English to black African work foremen—who, at the time, were known derogatorily as “boss boys". Charlotte and her sister Katie joined the African Jubilee Choir in 1891. Her talent attracted the attention of Mr K. V. Bam, a local choir master who was organizing an African choir to tour Europe. Charlotte's rousing success after her first solo performance in Kimberley Town Hall immediately resulted in her appointment to the Europe-bound choir operation, which was taken over from Bam by a European. The group left Kimberley in early 1896 and sang to numerous audiences in major cities of Europe. Command royal performances, including one at Queen Victoria's 1897 Jubilee at London's Royal Albert Hall, added to their mounting prestige. According to the African Feminist Forum, the two women were treated like novelties, which made them uncomfortable. At the conclusion of the European tour, the choir toured North America. The choir managed to sell out venues in Canada and the United States.

During the choir's tour of the United States, the group was abandoned by their escort in Cleveland. Bishop Daniel A. Payne, of the African Methodist Church (AME) in Ohio, a former missionary in the Cape, organized the churchgoers to provide for the abandoned troupe's continued stay in America. Although the choir wished to attend Howard University, they were made to settle for a church scholarship to Wilberforce University, the AME Church University in Xenia, Ohio. Mannya accepted the offer. At the university, she was taught under W. E. B. Du Bois, a major Pan-Africanist. On obtaining her BSc degree from Wilberforce University in 1903, she became the first black South African woman to earn a degree.

It was at Wilberforce that Mannya met her future husband, Dr Marshall Maxeke, a Xhosa born on 1 November 1874 at Middledrift. The couple lost a child prior to their marriage, and did not have any children thereafter. The couple married in 1903.

== Political activism and later life ==
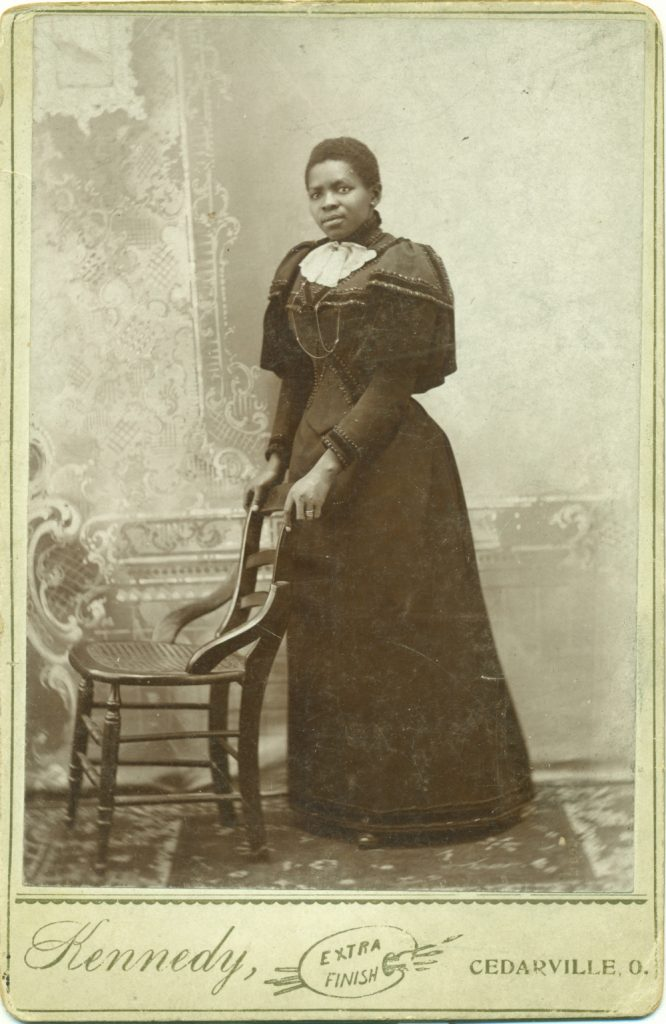
Charlotte Manye, in Ohio, 1890s

Charlotte Maxeke became politically active while in the African Methodist Episcopal Church, in which she played a part in bringing to South Africa. While in the AME Church, she was heavily involved in teaching and preaching the Gospel and advocating education for Africans of South Africa. The church later elected her president of the Women's Missionary Society.

Shortly after her return to South Africa in 1902, Maxeke began her involvement in anti-colonial politics. She, along with two other individuals from Transvaal, attended an early South African Native National Congress meeting, and was one of the few women present. She was notably the first South African Social worker, appointed as Welfare Officer to the Johannesburg Magisterial Court and involved in juvenile work. Maxeke attended the formal launch of the South African Native National Congress in Bloemfontein in 1912. Maxeke also became active in movements against pass laws through her political activities. During the Bloemfontein anti-pass campaign, Maxeke served as an impetus towards eventual protest by organizing women against the pass laws.

Many of Maxeke's concerns were related to social issues as well as ones that concerned the Church. In Umteteli wa Bantu, a multilingual weekly Johannesburg newspaper, she wrote in Xhosa about women's issues.

In 1918, Maxeke founded the Bantu Women's League (BWL), which later became part of the African National Congress Women's League. This decision stemmed from her involvement in anti-pass law demonstrations. The BWL under Maxeke was a grassroots movement that served as a vehicle for taking up grievances from a largely poor and rural base. Maxeke's BWL also demanded better working conditions for women farm workers. However, the white authorities largely ignored such issues. Furthermore, Maxeke led a delegation to see Louis Botha, who was then South African prime minister, to discuss the issue of passes for women. These discussions led to counter-protest the following year, which was against passes for women. Maxeke and an army of 700 women then marched to the Bloemfontein City Council, where they burned their passes. Maxeke addressed an organisation for the voting rights of women — the Women's Reform Club in Pretoria, and also joined the Council of Europeans and Bantus. She was elected as the president of the Women's missionary society. Maxeke participated with protests related to low wages at Witwatersrand and eventually joined the Industrial and Commercial Workers Union in 1920. Her leadership skills prompted the South African Ministry of Education to call her to testify before several government commissions in Johannesburg on matters concerning African education. This was a first for any African of any gender. Maxeke continued to be involved in many multiracial groups fighting against the Apartheid system and for women's rights.

Her husband, Marshall Maxeke, died in 1928. The same year Charlotte Maxeke set up an employment agency for Africans in Johannesburg and also began service as a juvenile parole officer. Maxeke remained somewhat active in South African politics until her death, serving as a leader of the ANC in the 1930s. She was also instrumental in the foundation of the National Council of African Women, which served as a way of protecting the welfare of Africans inside South Africa.

Maxeke died on 16 October 1939 in Johannesburg, at the age of 68.

== Legacy ==
Maxeke is often honoured as the "Mother of Black Freedom in South Africa". A statue of her stands in Pretoria's Garden of Remembrance.

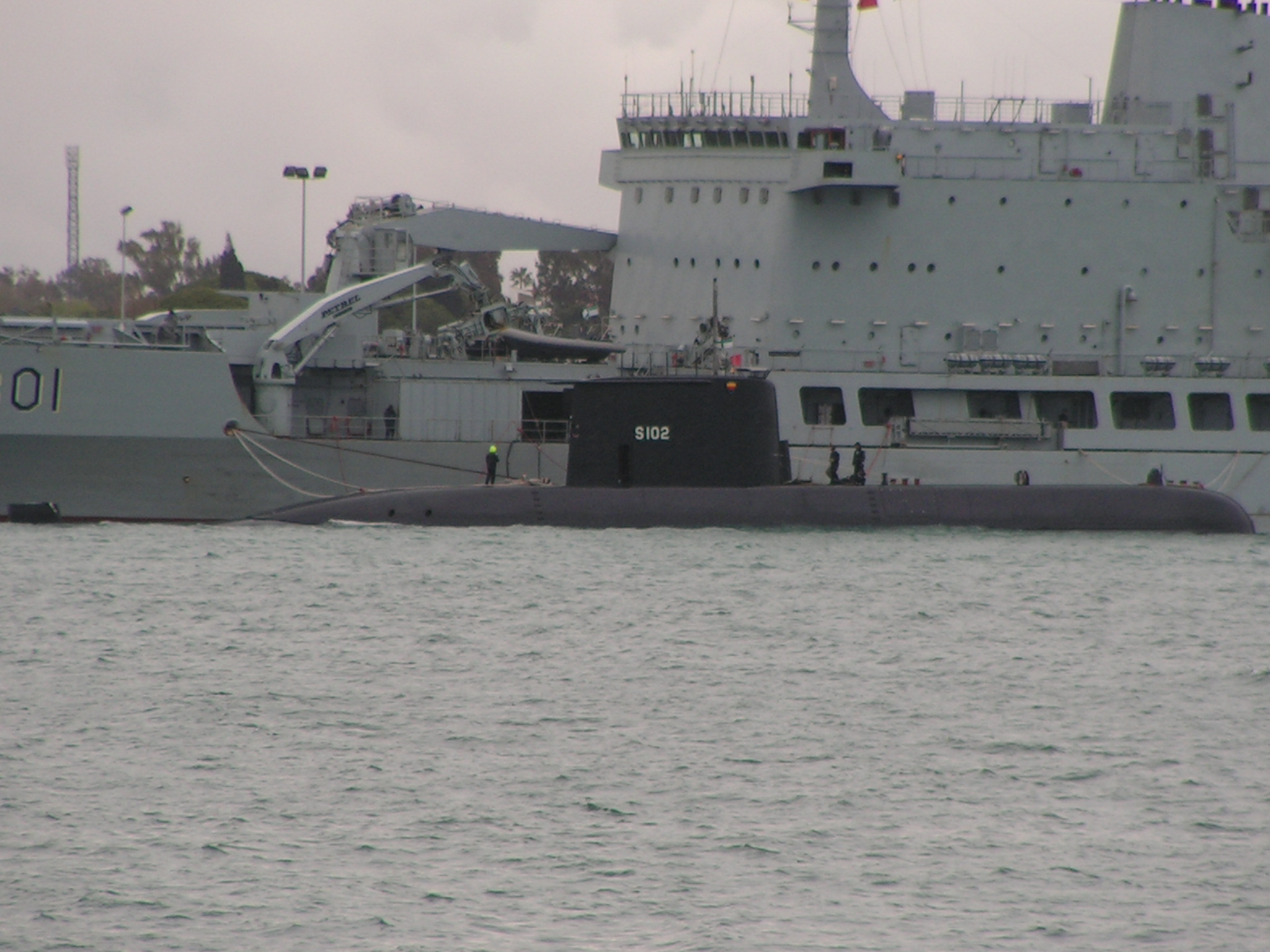
S102 SAS Charlotte Maxeke,

Many organizations in South Africa bear her name. Charlotte Maxeke Johannesburg Academic Hospital, formerly the Johannesburg General Hospital, is located in the suburb of Parktown. There is an ANC nursery school named after Charlotte Maxeke. At an event in 2015 dedicated to International Women's Day at Kliptown's Walter Sisulu Square, the Gauteng Infrastructure Development MEC planned to convert Maxeke's home into a museum and interpretation centre. The three Heroine-class submarines in service with the South African Navy were each named after powerful South African women: S101 is named SAS Manthatisi, after a chief of the Tlôkwa people, S102 is SAS Charlotte Maxeke, and S103 is SAS Queen Modjadji, named for the Rain Queen of the Lobedu people.

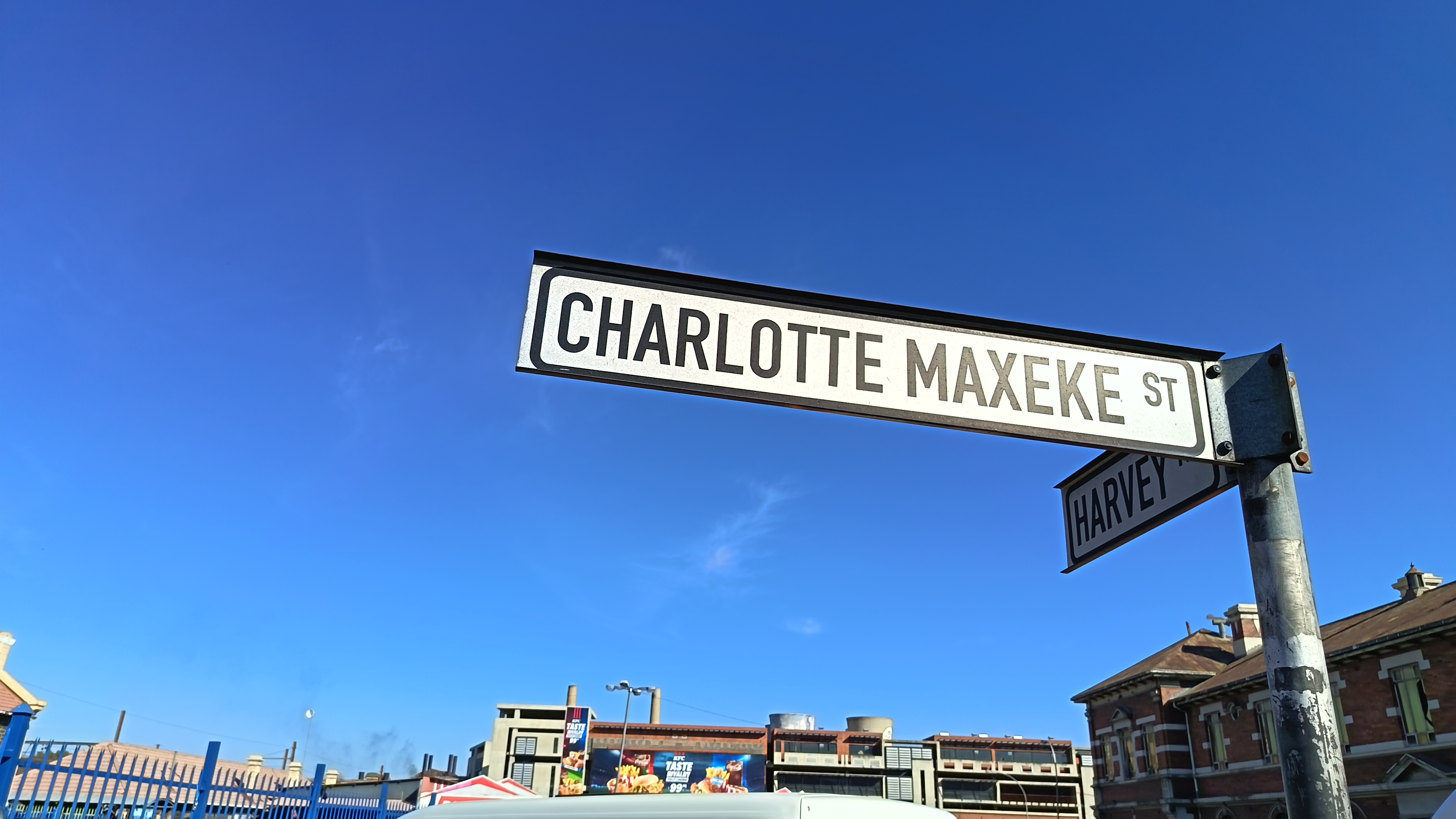
Charlotte Maxeke street, Bloemfontein, Free State.

The ANC also hosts an annual Charlotte Maxeke Memorial Lecture. Beatrice Street in Durban was changed to Charlotte Maxeke Street in her honour. As the woman who contributed and brought African Methodist Episcopal Church (AME) to South Africa and was elected as the president, her legacy now in South Africa is the league for women named "Charlotte Maxeke ladies fellowship". In 2012, Maitland Street in Bloemfontein was renamed Charlotte Maxeke Street in honour of her contribution to South Africa.

In 1905 Maxeke and her husband founded the Wilberforce Institute in Evaton, Vaal Triangle. The college is still operational.

In August 2026, the South African Reserve Bank launched a commemorative R2 coins to celebrate 125 anniversary of Maxeke since she became the first Black woman to earn a university degree. The coins also pays tribute to the Women's March of 1956.

== See also ==
- Defiance Campaign
- Bloemfontein anti-pass campaign
