= Operation Lark =

- Location: Mozambique Operation Lark (Mozambique)
- Objective: Assassination of Robert Mugabe
- Date: November / December 1978

Operation Lark was two special forces naval operations in 1978 conducted by members of the South African Navy (SADF), 4 Reconnaissance Regiment and Rhodesian SAS during the South African Border War. Its objective was the assassination of Robert Mugabe at his residence in Maputo, Mozambique.

== Background ==
The Rhodesian Central Intelligence Organisation (CIO) had been monitoring Robert Mugabe's movements in Maputo, Mozambique. He was the leader of the Zimbabwe African National Union (ZANU) liberation movement in exile. The initial plan involved a 4 Reconnaissance Regiment (4RR) boat team using zodiacs from a South African Navy submarine, SAS Johanna van der Merwe to infiltrate a Rhodesian SAS team into Maputo to attack the residence of Mugabe on the Avinida Don Maria Secunda.

A reconnaissance mission to Maputo was conducted of potential landing sites and routes to the target were conducted prior to the operation. MV Johan Hugo, a South African collier which routinely visited Maputo was used to infiltrated two undercover intelligence operatives, Major Wilson and Lt. Peter Sutcliffe, operating as South African Railways and Harbour officials.

The mission proposed for a Rhodesian SAS team to be delivered to the beach landing by two zodiacs piloted by members of 4RR, launched offshore off Inhaca Island from a South African strike craft. The strike craft would then return to Durban and the raid team would be recovered by a South African submarine which would return them to Durban as well. The operation would be known as Lark 1 and Lark 2.

== Order of Battle ==
=== South African forces ===
- Operations Commander – Captain Peter Fougstedt
- 4 Reconnaissance Regiment – Cmdt Malcolm Kinghorn (Mission Commander)
- SAS Johanna van der Merve - Cdr Evert Groenewald
- SAS PW Botha - Cdr Errol Massey-Hicks

=== Rhodesian forces ===
- Ten members of Rhodesian SAS Zebra Group – Major Grahame Wilson (Raid Commander)
- CIO operatives

== Operation ==
=== Lark 1 ===
During November 1978, the South African submarine left Durban first and on arrival off Maputo had to wait two days for weather conditions to improve before launching the zodiac's of the 4RR boat team to conduct an onshore reconnaissance by two members of the SAS. After a short but successful reconnoitre of the landing site, they returned to the submarine. The submarine would later rendezvous with the strike-craft and transferred the boat team and SAS raiders to the craft.

The strike-craft launched the raid boats and crews and they head west to the Maputo shoreline. One of the raid boats was damaged en route to the landing site and could not keep up endangering the raid timetable. A decision was made and the boats returned to the submarine which then towed them until it could meet up with the strike-craft which had been recalled from its return trip to Durban and re-embarked them for reuse in any further mission.

=== Lark 2 ===
The second chance began late December when the submarine SAS Johanna van der Merve left Cape Town but soon experienced engine issues and had to limp into East London for repairs. With repairs completed it resume its mission and headed up the coast to Mozambique. The strike-craft left Durban on Christmas Eve and headed north too. The two met up and the strike-craft launched the raiding boats which made it to the landing beach. The target was confirmed as being at home by their CIO contact and the raiding party headed to their target while the raiding boats remained 50m offshore. The raiding party found Mugabe's home empty including no staff. Waiting there as long as they could, the raiding party then returned to the beach and were picked up by the two boats and eventually made contact with the submarine. The submarine towed the boats back to the strike-craft and they were re-embarked and both vessels returned to Durban.

== Aftermath ==
Poor intelligence on the ground in Maputo was the only reason the mission was not successful though the possibility of a leak was considered. The use of the navy vessels, the launch of the zodiac's to shore, the raid on the home and the retrieval of the raiders had gone as planned.

Operation LARK was followed by Operation BARGAIN, a similar operation but which used fast boats for insertion and extraction, rather than a submarine, as SADF special operations tactics evolved.
