= Bloemfontein anti-pass campaign =

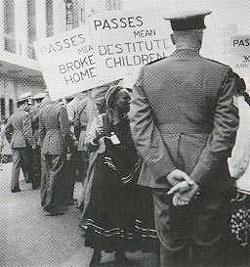
Black and Coloured women protesting against pass laws in Bloemfontein, Free State in 1913

The 1913 Bloemfontein anti-pass campaign was a series of repeals by women of colour against official regulations which forced them to carry documentation of formal employment and restricted their movement. The pass system was enforced to ensure control over the Black and Coloured women providing domestic services in what was then one of the Boer Republics, namely the Orange Free State

== Background ==
The discovery of minerals in Kimberley and gold in the Transvaal gave rise to economic development and necessitated the construction of a railway line between Bloemfontein and the Transvaal.

The British takeover from Boer leadership between 1848 and 1854 led to Bloemfontein becoming an administrative, commercial and legal hub. This development attracted a community of skilled and semi-skilled Black people, Coloureds and Indian South Africans as workers, professionals and farm labourers. Government records at the time refer to the people of colour who settled in the city as “Bastard,” “Bushmen,” “Fingo,” “Griqua” and “Hottentot,” among other derogatory terms. Among the women who settled in Bloemfontein during this period were professionals and domestic workers, who were the wives of middle class men. Many of the people of colour came from Thaba 'Nchu, Lesotho and were Tswana people with heterogenous backgrounds and historical ties to the area.

Initially, there was no distinction between Black and Coloured people in Bloemfontein and they lived in the same areas unlike in other parts of the country, like in the Colony of Natal and the Cape Colony. These demographic groups were considered Black then. Waaihoek, a location for Black people, just outside the town, emerged to accommodate the growing Black population and to move Black people away from the railway line, where many had become squatters. The establishment of Waaihoek led to the implementation of formal regulations, restricting the settlement of Black people to this area in 1891, away from where the white population lived. The Black population still provided services in the form of skilled and unskilled labour for the main town's growing economy.

== Restrictions and regulations ==
By the early 1900s, the law required every Black male person, including school learners above the age of 16, to carry a service book which documented their employer and place of residence. The Orange Free State was the first territory in South Africa to implement pass laws for women. In order to live and work in the city, even in the location of Waaihoek, this document had to be renewed monthly at a fee. Many women who did not live in urban areas or were not employed on a full-time basis as domestic workers did white people's laundry for income. They often travelled to their townships with laundry from parts of Bloemfontein which were assigned to white people. Health authorities eventually traced cases of diphtheria, scarlet and typhoid fever to the laundry done in unhygienic conditions in the township.

In 1906, the Bloemfontein municipality built public laundry houses in town with sinks, steam rooms and ironing facilities. These Black women were then prohibited from taking white people's laundry to the location and subjected to permit fees, which allowed them to use the public laundry facilities. The pass laws and permits that were mostly introduced by the municipality put financial strain on women of colour. In the same year, the Union of South Africa government published new rules for the enforcing the passes and police were given instructions of how to enforce the regulations. By October 1906 the effects of enforcing the residential pass were being felt in areas like Waaihoek. White farmers also pushed for more stringent measures to control black people. As a result, a new pass law aimed at black people in rural areas was put in force.

In 1907, a new law was passed in Bloemfontein requiring domestic servants to carry a service book where details on their employment were written. These books were to be carried at all times and produced when demanded. Any person found without the book more than three times would be banished from the city. In 1908, a special Native Administration commission was established to investigate labour needs.

== Organisations ==
African National Congress Flag

Under the organisation's constitution, women were not allowed to participate as full members of the South African Native National Convention (SANNC), now known as the African National Congress (ANC), when it was founded in 1912. As auxiliary members, they had no voting rights but participated collectively. This led to the formal launch of the Bantu Women's League under the leadership of Charlotte Maxeke in 1913. The organisation, which mainly consisted of educated middle-class Black women, was established to challenge the pass laws that had been controlling the movement of Black women in the province. The Orange Free State Native, Coloured Women's Association (led by Catharina Symmons and Katie Louw) and the African People's Organisation (a predominately Coloured organisation based in the Western Cape) were also among the organisations who actively fought against the racial restrictions.

== Resistance ==
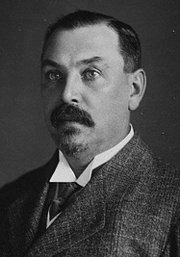
Louis Botha

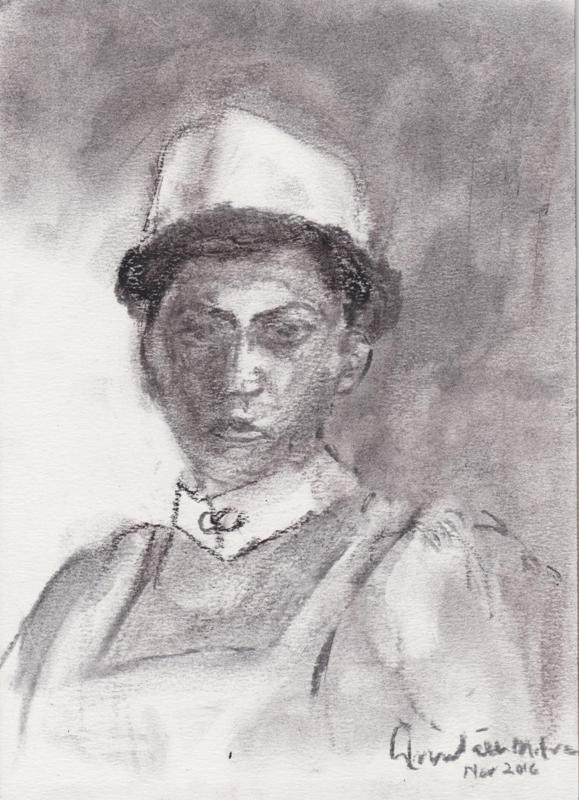
Cecilia Makiwane

When Black political figures repeatedly appealed to the Orange Free State authorities to abolish the pass laws, in vain, the women began approaching the higher offices of the national government.

Once they had collected 5 000 women's signatures for a petition, in March 1912 the women's league handed the petition to Louis Botha who was then Prime Minister of the Union of South Africa.

After the prime minister read their demands, six women presented their case in Cape Town to the Minister of Finance (heading the Native Affairs portfolio) Henry Burton in April 1912. The Minister is believed to have assured them that action would take place but, after another year, the women's requests still went largely ignored.

On 28 May 1913, the league met in Waaihoek to discuss the next steps and concluded that they would practise civil disobedience and no longer carry passes. On that day 200 women led by Charlotte Maxeke marched on the Bloemfontein Mayor's office, and were still unsuccessful in their appeal. Cecilia Makiwane was among them. The following day, on 29 May 1913, hundreds of women marched into town and destroyed their passes by ripping them and burning them in public. 80 women were arrested over the next two days. Protests also broke out in areas like Jagersfontein, Fauresmith, Winburg and across Bloemfontein, where hundreds more people were arrested. In Winburg a group of white women implemented a march to illustrate their support for the non-white women and their cause.

== Outcome ==
Despite pressure applied by the women against in 1913, the Union of South Africa's government refused to remove them. The campaign gained national media coverage in 1913 when they first began to receive greater support for their campaign. The coverage won the sympathy of the Union government officials in Cape Town. Throughout the Orange Free State, blue ribbons were a symbol of participation and support of the anti-pass campaign.

On 27 January 1914 the Executive Committee of the Orange Free State Native and Coloured Women's Association sent a petition to Governor General Gladstone. Women pleaded with him to persuade the Prime Minister and Minister of Native Affairs to relax the pass laws. As a result, on 3 March 1914 the Prime Minister proposed that all pass laws should be looked into. Members of Parliament from the Orange Free State supported a strict enforcing of the pass laws while some from the Cape disagreed. The Women's petition was tabled for discussion in parliament on 29 May 1914. However, by mid 1914 the campaign began to lose momentum and eventually ended.

== Legacy ==
The 1913 Bloemfontein anti-pass campaign is seen as the inspiration behind the anti-pass campaigns such as the 1956 Women's March and the ANC's 1952 Defiance Campaign. In commemoration of the 100th anniversary of the 1913 anti-pass campaign, the Free State ANC Women's League marched in Bloemfontein on 28 May 2013.

== See also ==
- Pass laws
- African National Congress Women's League
