= SAS Assegaai =

Coordinates: 34.191008°S 18.437549°E

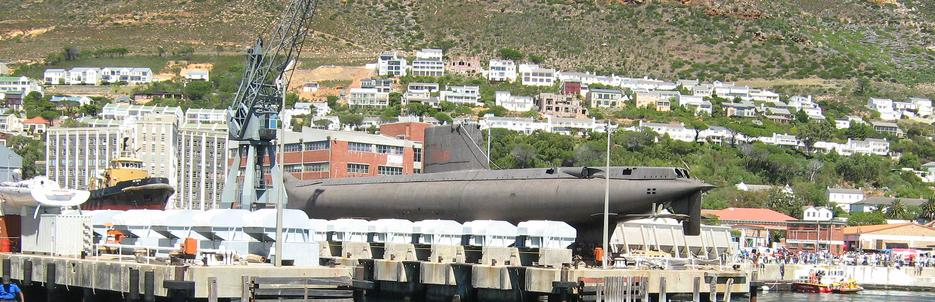
- SAS Assegaai

History

South Africa
- Name: SAS Assegaai
- Namesake: Johanna van der Merwe
- Ordered: 10 February 1967
- Builder: Dubigeon-Normandie SA, Nantes
- Laid down: 24 April 1969
- Launched: 21 July 1970
- Christened: Johanna van der Merwe, S99
- Commissioned: 21 August 1971
- Decommissioned: 23 November 2003
- Renamed: SAS Assegai
- Home port: Simon's Town
- Status: Museum ship

General characteristics
- Class & type: Daphne-class submarine
- Displacement: 860 tons surface, 700 tons standard, 1034 tons submerged
- Length: 57.8 m (190 ft)
- Beam: 6.75 m (22.1 ft)
- Draught: 5.23 m (17.2 ft)
- Installed power: 2 SEMT Pielstick 450kW diesel generators, 2 × 80 cell batteries
- Propulsion: 2 Jeumont-Schneider elect propulsion motors
- Speed: 13.5 knots (25.0 km/h; 15.5 mph) surfaced; 16 knots (30 km/h; 18 mph) submerged
- Range: 4,300 nautical miles (8,000 km) at 7.5 knots (13.9 km/h) snorkeling; 2,700 nautical miles (5,000 km) at 12.5 knots (23.2 km/h) surface
- Complement: 6 officers and 45 ratings, and 6 to 10 trainees
- Armament: 12 × 550 mm (22 in) torpedoes, 8 forward and 4 aft

SAS Assegaai, formerly known as SAS Johanna van der Merwe, was a Daphné-class submarine of the South African Navy. Decommissioned in 2003, SAS Assegaai is the only one of the former three Daphné-class submarines to have been retained for preservation as a museum boat, the other two have been cut up and sold for scrap. The Daphné-class submarines have since been replaced by the Type 209, or Heroine-class submarines.

== Daphné-class submarines ==
On 10 February 1967, after nearly two years of negotiations, an order was placed with the French Government to provide three Daphné (Dolphin)-class submarines in addition to providing the training and infrastructure to run and maintain them. The first of these submarines, SAS Maria van Riebeeck, was launched on 18 March 1969. The second boat was SAS Emily Hobhouse, and the last of the three, SAS Johanna van der Merwe. In 1999 the three boats were renamed SAS Spear, SAS Umkhonto and SAS Assegaai respectively. In 2003, SAS Spear was cut up for scrap, followed by SAS Umkhonto in 2008 while SAS Assegaai is being preserved as a museum exhibit.

== History ==
Laid down at the Dubigeon-Normandie shipyard in Nantes on 24 April 1969, she was launched on 21 July 1970. Commissioned under command of Lt Cdr Theo Honiball on 21 August 1971, she completed her workup training in the Mediterranean, operating out of Toulon, before sailing for home on 4 May 1972. During the long passage, she was escorted by the frigate SAS President Steyn, and called at Cádiz, São Vicente, Luanda and Walvis Bay, before arriving in Simon's Town on 19 June 1972. Her arrival in South Africa marked the successful culmination of five years of construction, trials and training to establish South Africa's first ever submarine capability. It was not long before the submarines were involved in operations, and in 1975, just before Operation Savannah (Angola), SAS Johanna van der Merwe was deployed into Angolan waters under Operation Yskas to prepare for the evacuation of SA military personnel. During the South African Border War, she took part in some ten clandestine special operations.

During her career, she underwent four refits, which included installing additional fuel tanks, and the fitting of a locally developed RAKA combat suite in the 1980s, which replaced a cumbersome plotting table. In the late 1990s she received the South African developed NICKLES fully integrated software based combat suite and two state of the art rebuilt periscopes. With the acquisition of the new Type 209 submarines for the SA Navy, SAS Assegaai was paid off on 23 November 2003.

== Museum boat ==
SAS Assegaai has been converted into a museum ship and is stationed in Simon's Town (City of Cape Town Metropolitan Municipality). A project that has been spearheaded by the South African Naval Heritage Trust, SAS Assegaai is a part of the South African Naval Museum.

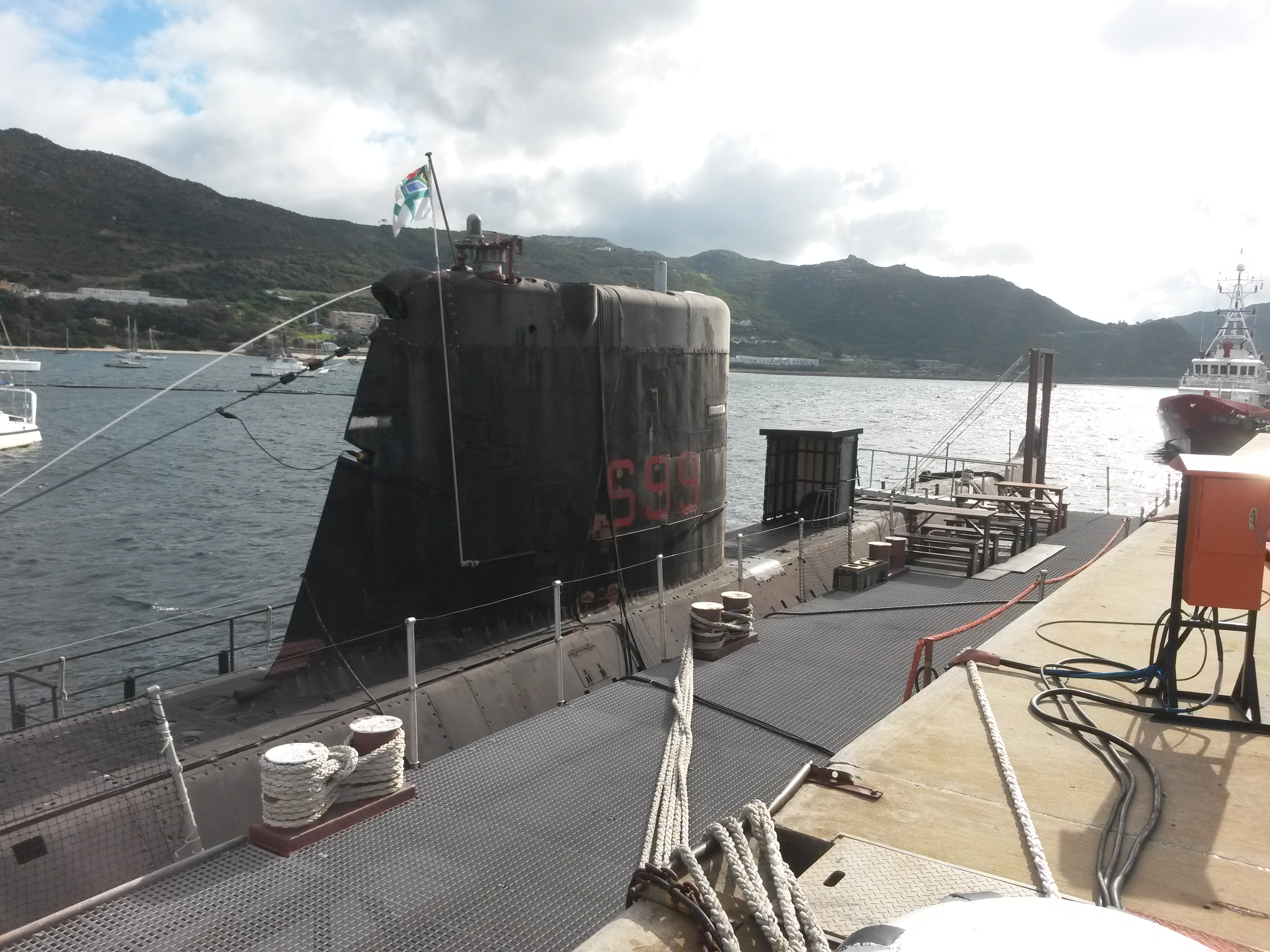
Lying alongside

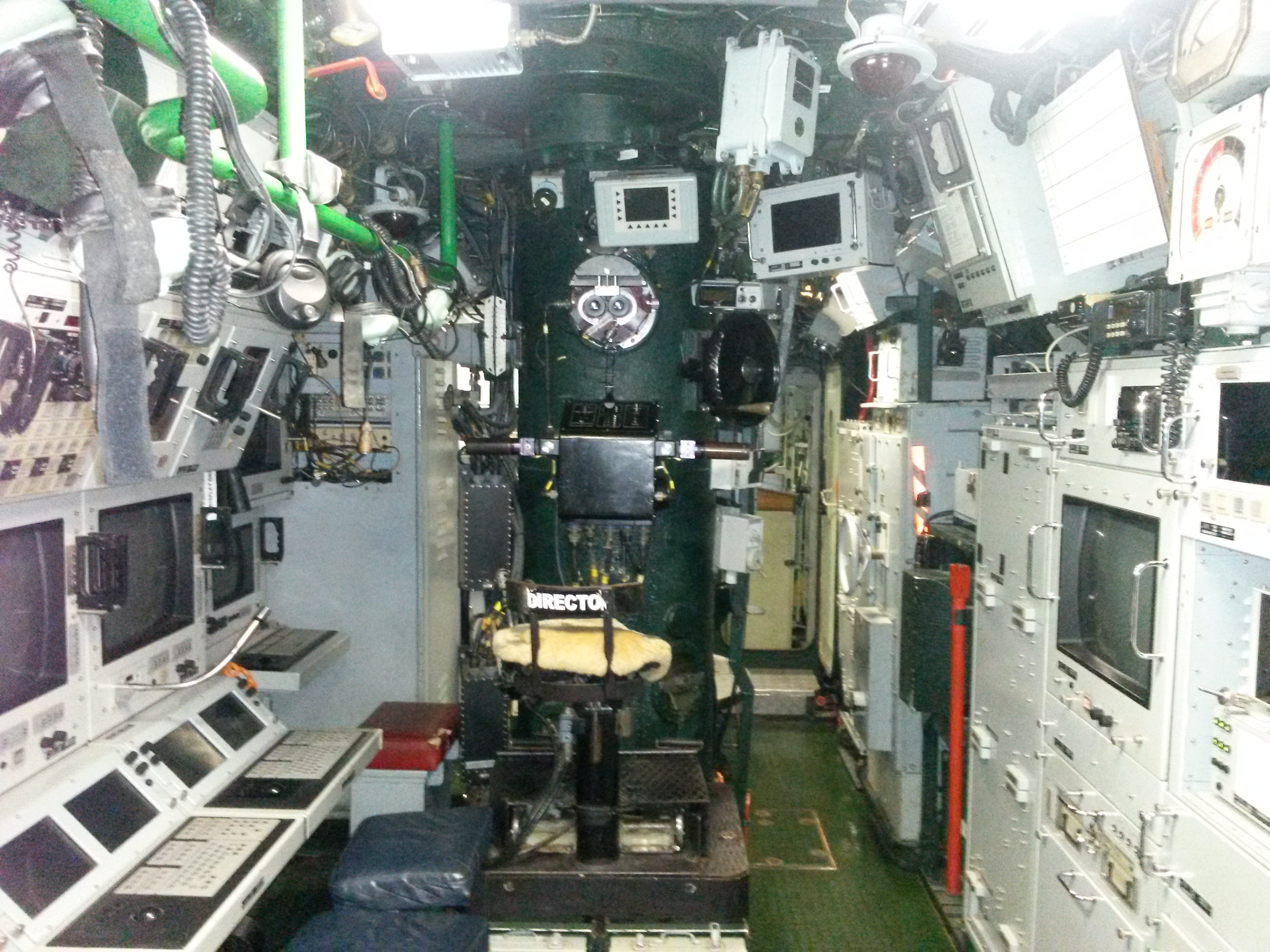
Captain's chair at the periscope

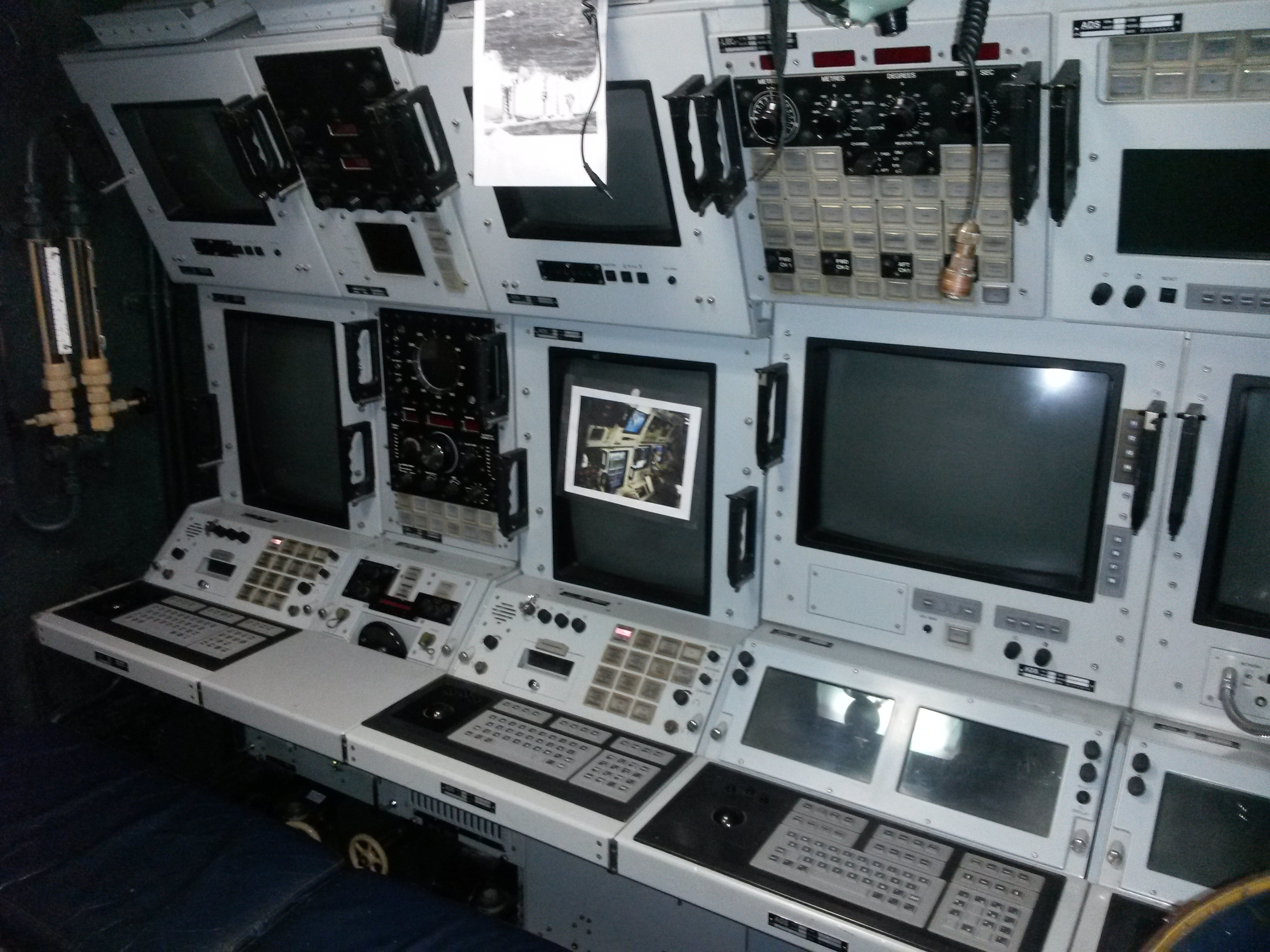
Combat Suite

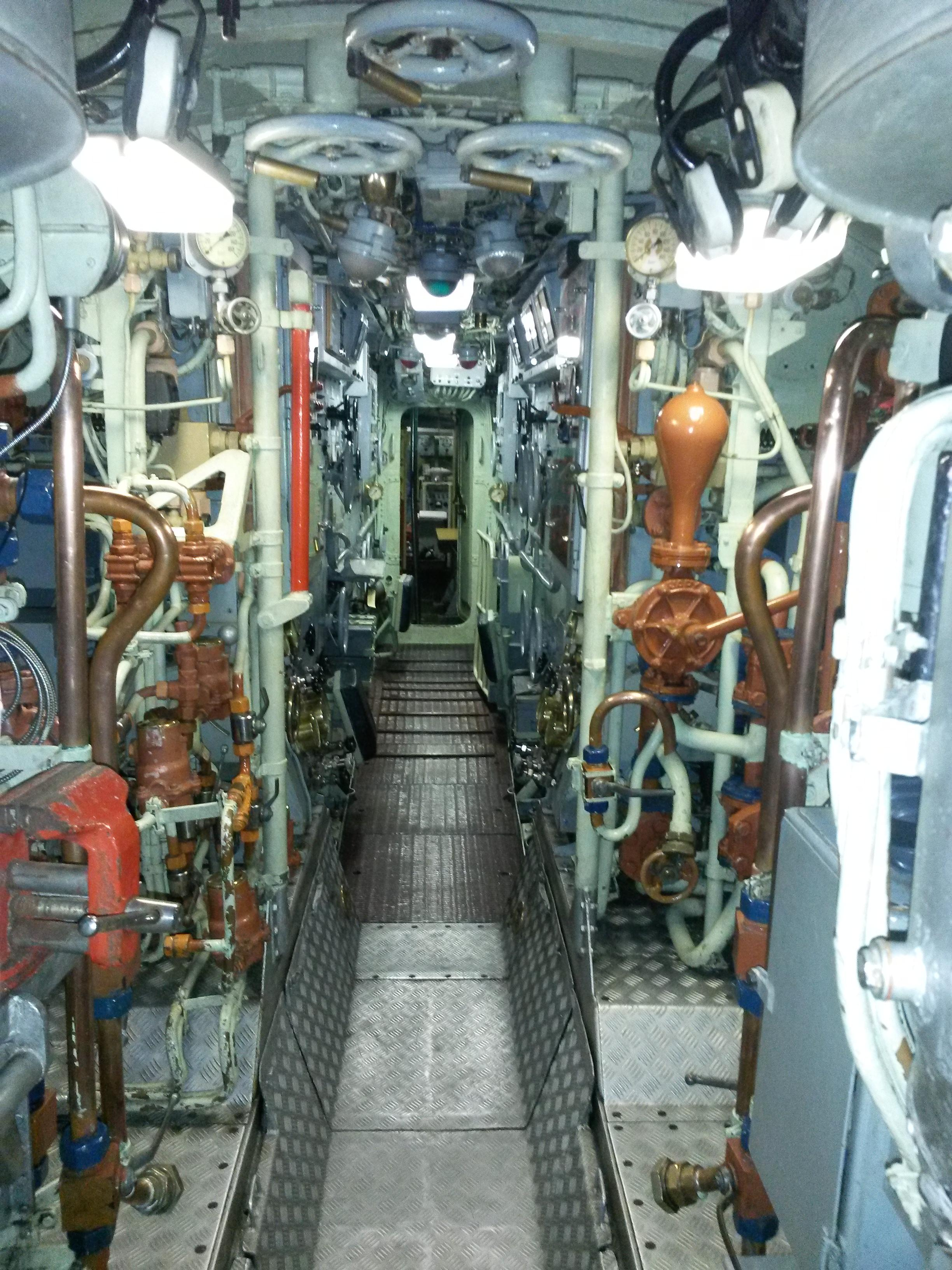
Interior

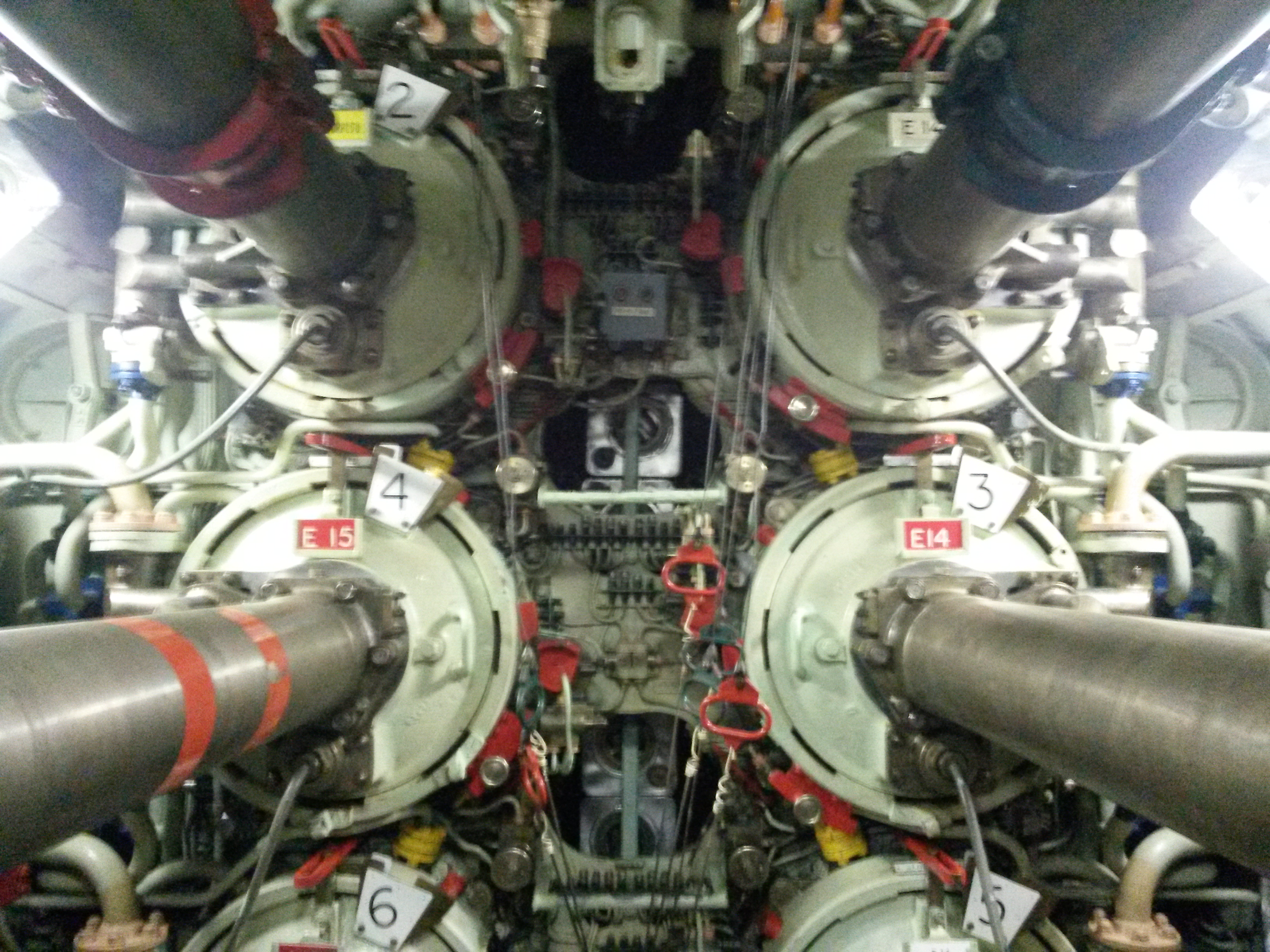
Torpedo tubes

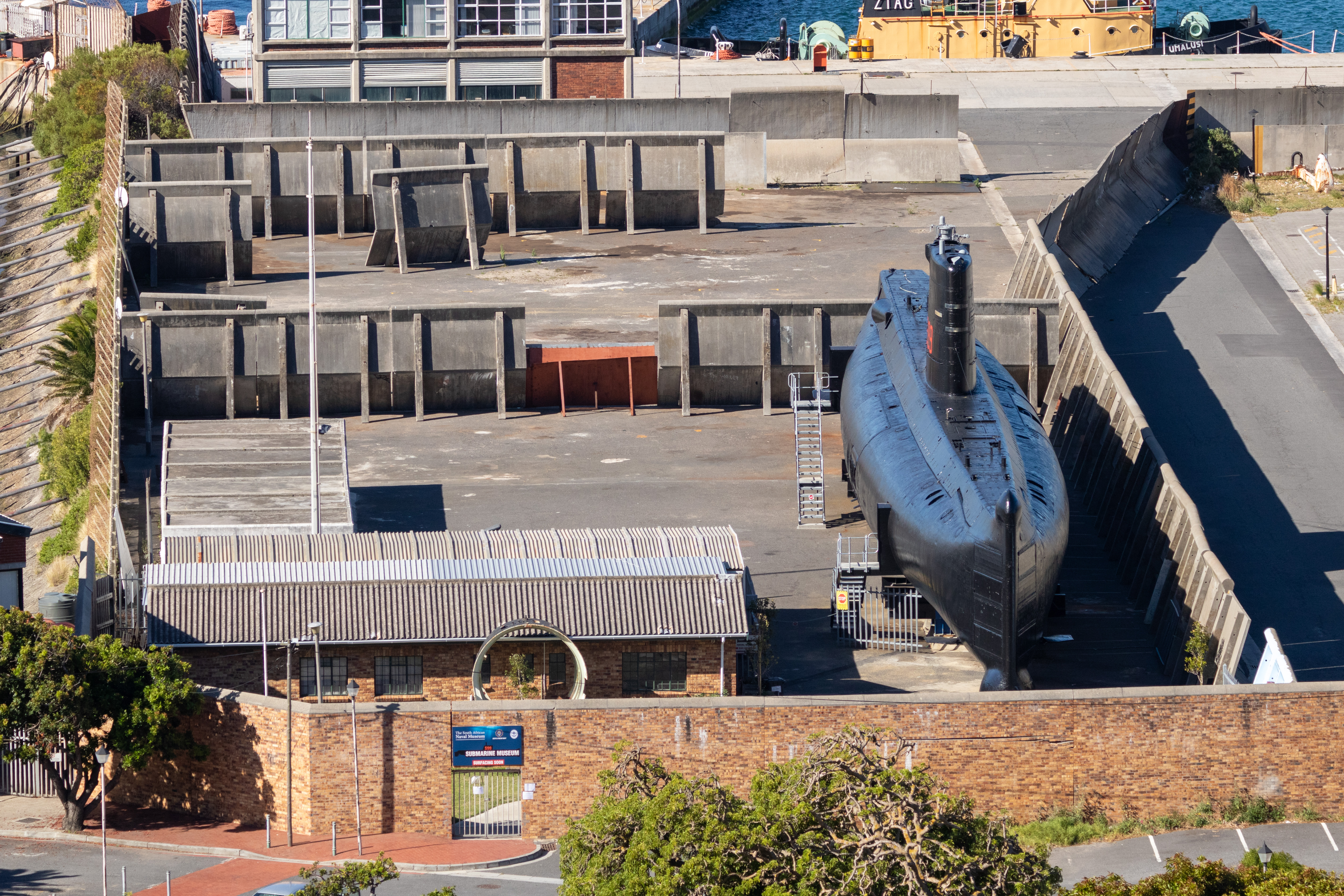
The museum as of December 2024
