= Daphné-class submarine =

French diesel-electric submarine class

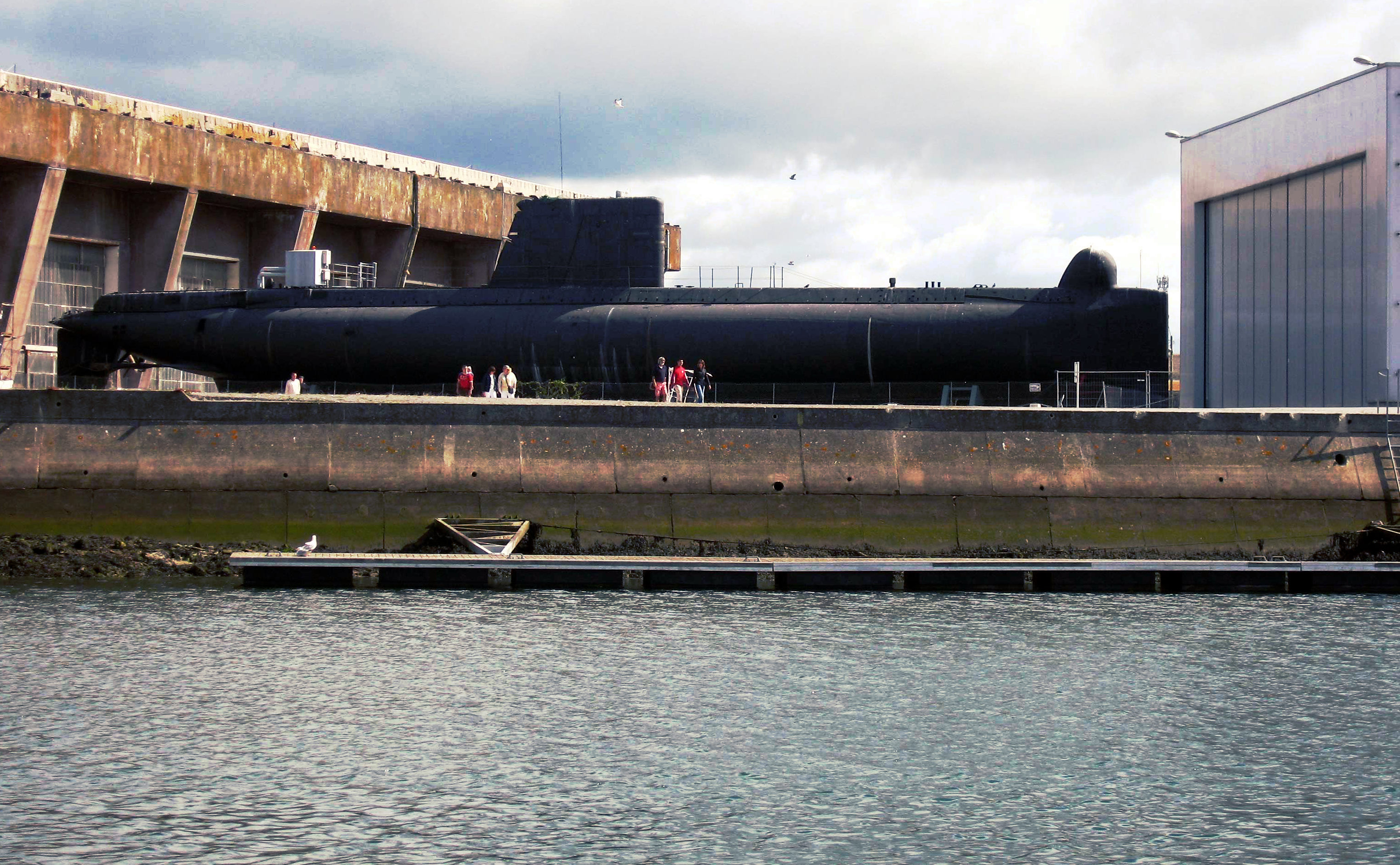
- Daphné-class submarine Flore

Class overview
- Name: Daphné class
- Operators: French Navy; Pakistan Navy; Portuguese Navy; South African Navy; Spanish Navy
- Preceded by: Aréthuse class
- Succeeded by: Agosta class; Rubis class
- Subclasses: Albacora class (Portugal); Hangor class (Pakistan); S60 class (Spain)
- Built: 1964–1975
- In commission: 1964–2010
- Planned: 25
- Completed: 25
- Lost: 2
- Retired: 19
- Preserved: 5

General characteristics in French service
- Type: Submarine
- Displacement: 700 t (690 long tons) standard; 860 t (850 long tons) surfaced; 1,038 t (1,022 long tons) submerged
- Length: 57.75 m (189 ft 6 in)
- Beam: 6.76 m (22 ft 2 in)
- Draught: 5.25 m (17 ft 3 in)
- Installed power: Diesel-electric, 1,000 shp (750 kW) sustained
- Propulsion: 2 shafts
- Speed: Submerged: 16 knots (30 km/h; 18 mph); Surfaced: 13.5 knots (25.0 km/h; 15.5 mph)
- Range: 4,300 nmi (8,000 km; 4,900 mi) at 7.5 kn (13.9 km/h; 8.6 mph) while snorkelling
- Endurance: 30 days
- Test depth: 300 m (980 ft)
- Complement: 45
- Sensors & processing systems: DRUA 31 radar; DUUA 2B sonar; DSUV 2 passive sonar; DUUX acoustic telemeter
- Electronic warfare & decoys: ARUR 10B radar detector
- Armament: 12 × 550 mm (22 in) torpedo tubes (8 bow, 4 stern); 12 torpedoes (no reloads)

The Daphné-class submarine was a class of the diesel-electric powered submarines designed and constructed for the French Navy in 1964. Marketed by the French government for the export market, the Daphné design went on to serve in South Africa while there were subclasses based on the Daphné design that were commissioned in the navies of Pakistan, Portugal, and Spain. The submarines were in operation between 1964 and the late 1990s, their service lives being extended to fill the capability gap until the newer French nuclear submarines became available. Two French submarines were lost and a third was sunk, but was salvaged.

== Background and design ==
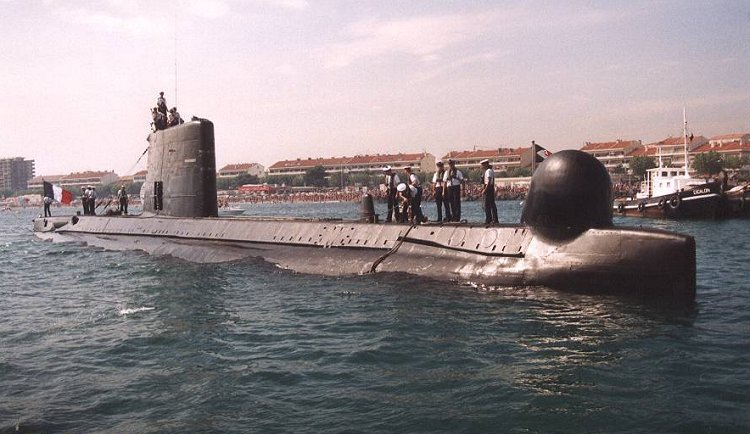
Doris

These submarines were developed from the preceding Aréthuse class by the French Navy. Larger than the Aréthuse class, they were a second-class counterpart to the ocean-going Narval class. Their design emphasized maneuverability, low noise production and ease of maintenance. As a result, the submarines were extremely quiet when submerged. Their maintenance system was based on modular replacement which led to low crew numbers, but also led to no reloads for their torpedo complement.

Submarines of the Daphné class in French service measured 57.75 metres (189 ft 6 in) long overall with a beam of 6.76 m (22 ft 2 in) and a draught of 5.25 m (17 ft 3 in). They had a standard displacement of 700 metric tons (690 long tons), and displaced 869 t (855 long tons) surfaced and 1,043 t (1,027 long tons) submerged. The submarines had a double hull and had a complement of 6 officers and 39 sailors.

Each vessel of the class was fitted with two SEMT-Pielstick diesel engines, with two 450-kilowatt diesel generator sets, and two electric motors turning two shafts creating 750 kilowatts (1,000 shp) sustained with the ability to create 970 kW (1,300 shp) for short periods. The first seven boats were given the SEMT-Pielstick 12 PA1 diesel engine type, while the final two hulls were given the SEMT-Pielstick 12 PA4-135 type. The submarines had a diving depth of 300 m (980 ft) and could remain at sea for 30 days. Daphné-class submarines had a maximum speed of 13.5 knots (25.0 km/h; 15.5 mph) surfaced and 16 knots (30 km/h; 18 mph) submerged with a range of 4,300 nautical miles (8,000 km; 4,900 mi) at 7.5 knots (13.9 km/h; 8.6 mph) while snorkelling.

The submarines were equipped with twelve torpedo tubes, eight located in the bow and four located in the stern. The submarines was armed with twelve 550-millimetre (21.7 in) torpedoes and no reloads. Each submarine sported one DRUA 33 radar and DUUA 1 sonar. Beginning in 1971, the boats were modernized and given the DUUA 2B search and attack sonar located in a dome situated atop the bow. They also received the updated DLT D3 torpedo fire control system. The submarines also mounted DSUV 2 passive sonar and DUUX 2 acoustic telemeter.

== Construction and career ==
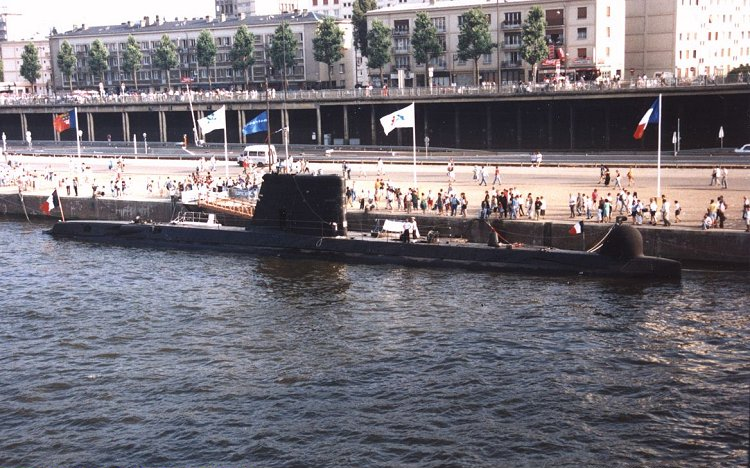
Psyché

Constructed at three shipyards in France, the first entered service in 1964 and the last in 1970. Two French submarines were lost; Minerve in 1968 and Eurydice in 1970. All of the remaining submarines underwent modernization beginning in 1971. Sirène sank in 1972 at Lorient, but was salvaged. The boats were planned for disposal in the 1980s, however, the slow delivery of their nuclear submarine replacements led to their careers being extended.

== Ships in class ==
French Daphné-class submarine construction data
Hull no.	Name	Builder	Laid down	Launched	Commissioned	Fate
S641	Daphné	Chantiers Dubigeon, Nantes	March 1958	20 June 1959	1 June 1964	Decommissioned 1989
S642	Diane	Chantiers Dubigeon, Nantes	July 1958	4 October 1960	20 June 1964	Decommissioned 1988
S643	Doris	Cherbourg Naval Dockyard, Cherbourg	September 1958	14 May 1960	26 August 1964	Decommissioned 1994
S644	Eurydice	Cherbourg Naval Dockyard, Cherbourg		19 June 1962	26 September 1964	Sank on 4 March 1970
S645	Flore	Cherbourg Naval Dockyard, Cherbourg	September 1958	14 May 1960	26 August 1964	Decommissioned 1989, preserved as museum ship in Lorient, France
S646	Galatée	Cherbourg Naval Dockyard, Cherbourg	September 1958	22 September 1961	25 July 1964	Decommissioned 1991
S647	Minerve	Chantiers, Dubigeon, Nantes		31 May 1961	10 June 1964	Sank 27 January 1968
S648	Junon	Cherbourg Naval Dockyard, Cherbourg	July 1961	11 May 1964	25 February 1966	Decommissioned 1996
S649	Vénus	Cherbourg Naval Dockyard, Cherbourg	August 1961	24 September 1964	1 June 1966	Decommissioned 1990
S650	Psyché	Brest Naval Dockyard, Brest	May 1965	28 June 1967	1 July 1969	Decommissioned 1996
S651	Sirène	Brest Naval Dockyard, Brest	May 1965	28 June 1967	1 March 1970	Decommissioned 1996

== Export ==
Following the end of World War II, the export market for warships had changed. Gone were the old purveyors of export warships like Italy and the US only sold used designs. This left the United Kingdom and France as the only countries with the extra shipbuilding capability to build ships for export. In the 1960s, the United Kingdom offered the Oberon class and the French offered the Daphné class. The Oberons were more expensive and more difficult to operate. Smaller navies opted for the Daphnés or in the case of Spain, were rejected by the United Kingdom.

=== Pakistan Navy ===
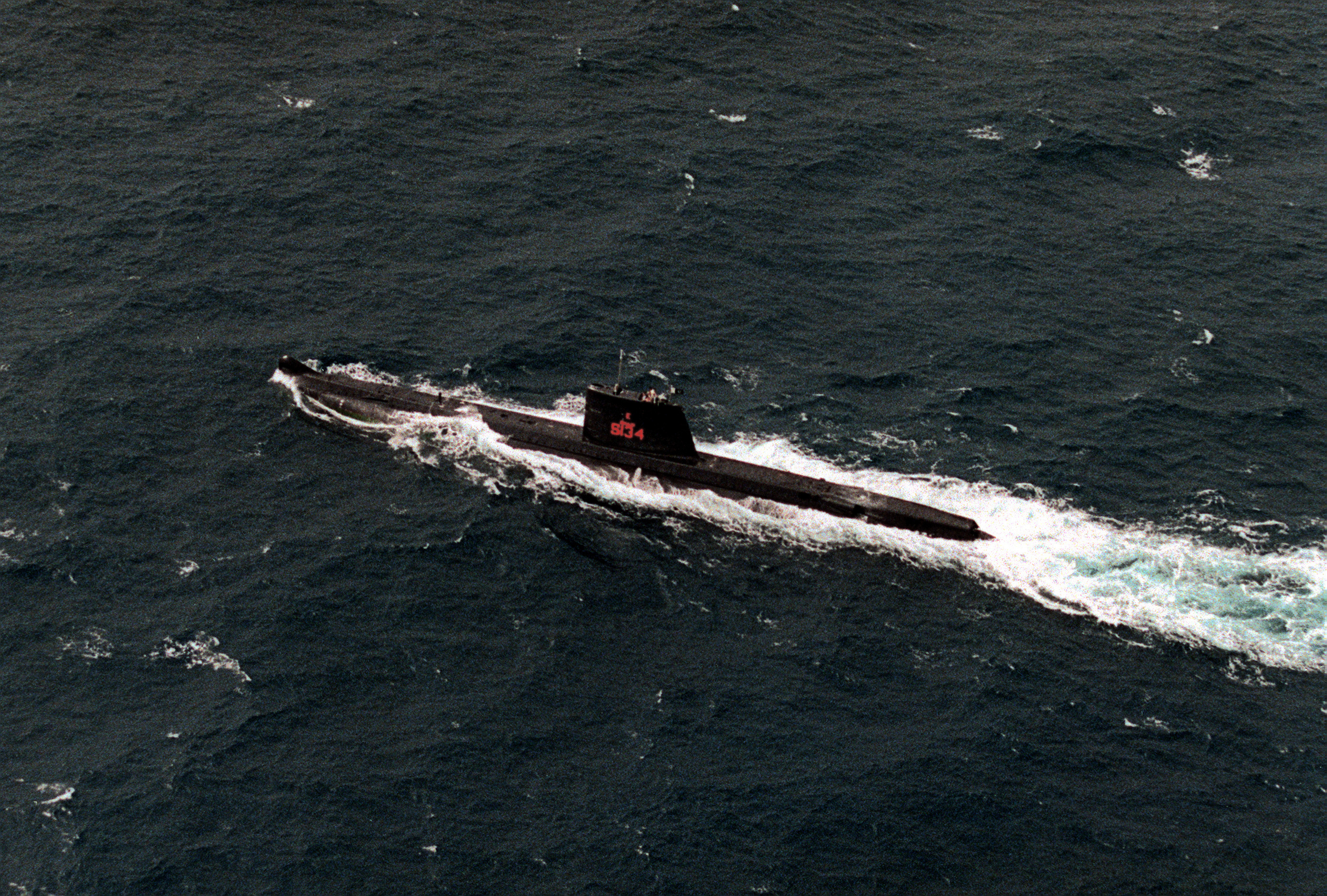
Initially the Portuguese Cachalote, the submarine was sold to Pakistan in 1975 and renamed Ghazi

The Pakistan Navy Daphné-class submarines, sometimes dubbed the Hangor class, were three submarines built in France for Pakistan and one acquired from Portugal in 1975. The first three hulls ordered were the first ever submarines constructed for Pakistan. The Hangor class used the 12 PA4-135 type diesel engines and had a complement of 5 officers and 45 sailors. Their interior differed from the French model in order to meet Pakistan's requirements. The fourth hull was acquired from Portugal in 1975. PNS Hangor sank the Indian frigate INS Khukri during the 1971 Indo-Pakistani war. In the late 1980s, the vessels had the capability of launching submarine-launched anti-ship missiles added, making them able to fire Harpoon missiles. Pakistan has now retired the submarines and is replacing them.

Hangor-class submarine construction data
Hull no.	Name	Builder	Laid down	Launched	Commissioned	Fate
S131	PNS Hangor	Brest Naval Dockyard, Brest	1 December 1967	28 June 1967	12 January 1970	Decommissioned January 2006 and placed in Pakistan Maritime Museum
S132	PNS Shushuk	C.N. Ciotat, Le Trait	1 December 1967	30 July 1969	12 January 1970	Decommissioned January 2006
S133	PNS Mangro	C.N. Ciotat, Le Trait	8 July 1968	7 February 1970	8 August 1970	Decommissioned January 2006
S134	PNS Ghazi	Acquired in December 1975, former Portuguese NRP Cachalote			17 January 1977	Decommissioned January 2006

=== Portuguese Navy ===
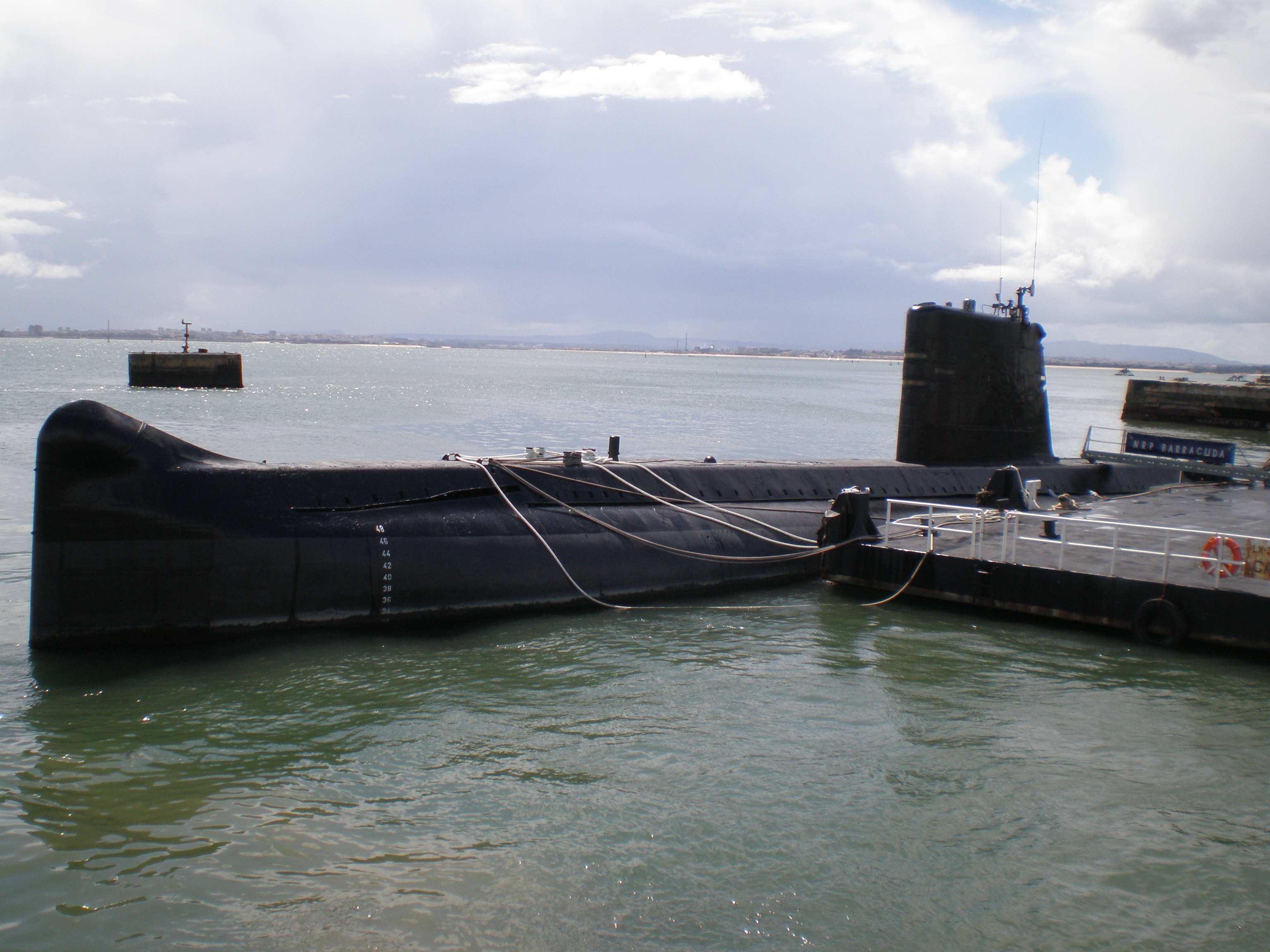
NRP Barracuda at Cacilhas dock in 2012

The four Albacora-class submarines of the Portuguese Navy were ordered in 1964 and built in France using the Daphné design with some modifications to meet Portuguese requirements. The submarines were of prefabricated design with component sections being constructed between 1 October 1964 and 6 September 1965. The four vessels were equipped with the SEMT-Pielstick 12 PA1 diesel engines. The submarines were fitted for operating in tropical waters. In 1975 Portugal sold Cachalote to Pakistan.

Albacora-class submarine construction data
Pennant	Name	Builder	Laid down	Launched	Commissioned	Fate
S163	NRP Albacora	Chantiers Dubigeon, Nantes	6 September 1965	13 October 1966	1 October 1967	Decommissioned 2000. Sunk at moorings and scrapped, 2011
S164	NRP Barracuda	Chantiers Dubigeon, Nantes	19 October 1965	24 April 1967	4 May 1968	Decommissioned 2010. Preserved in Lisbon
S165	NRP Cachalote	Chantiers Dubigeon, Nantes	27 October 1966	16 February 1968	25 January 1969	Sold in December 1975 to Pakistan
S166	NRP Delfim	Chantiers Dubigeon, Nantes	14 May 1967	23 September 1968	1 October 1969	Decommissioned 2005

=== South African Navy ===
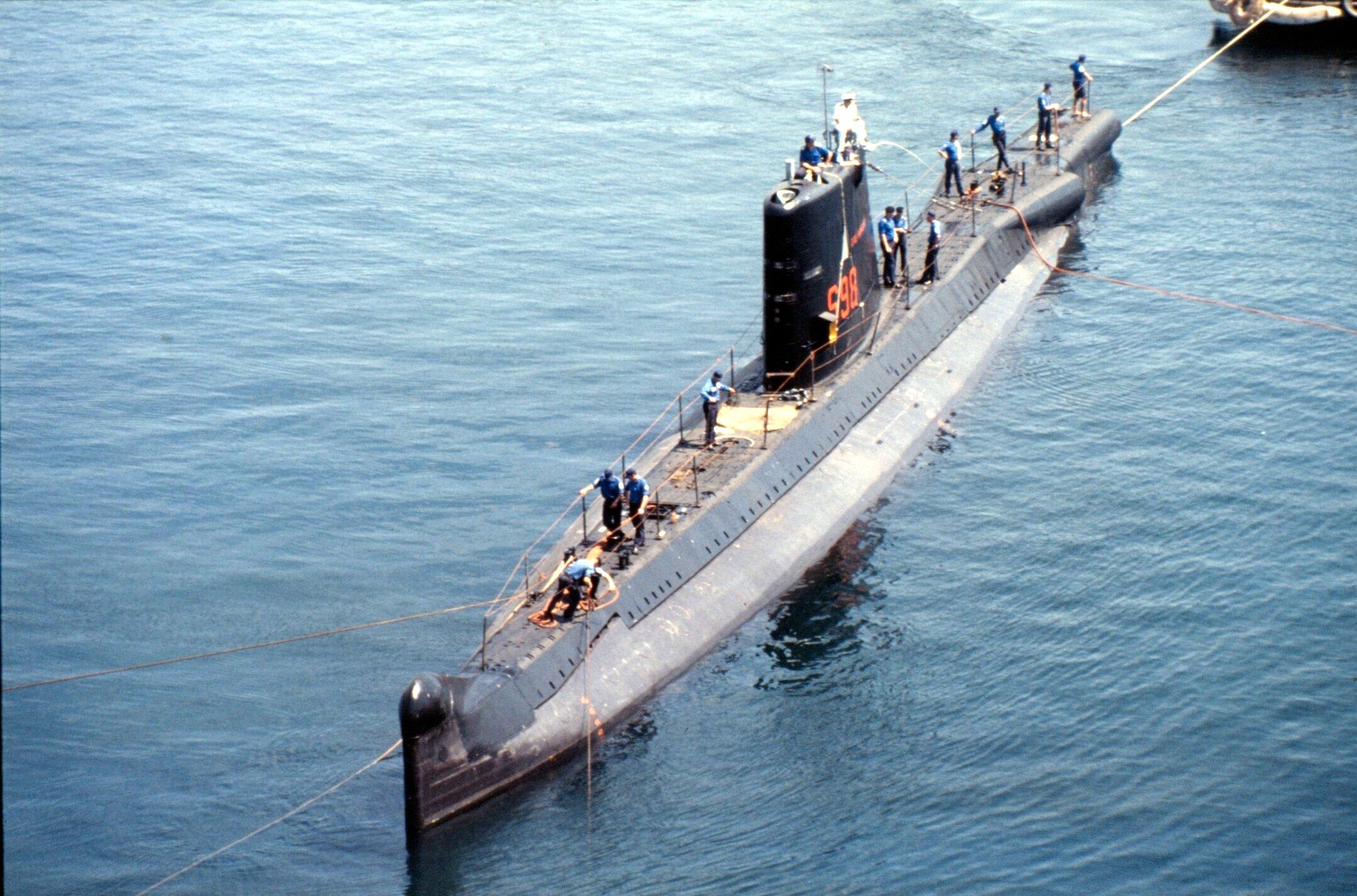
SAS Assegaai as SAS Emily Hobhouse c. 1994

After South Africa became a republic in 1961, the country was forced to leave the Commonwealth and the United Kingdom refused to sell weapons to the country. South Africa turned to France and in conjunction with the construction of a submarine base at Simon's Town, acquired three Daphné hulls in 1967. These were the first submarines ever constructed for South Africa. Upon completion of the first ship, the three vessels were sometimes referred to as the Maria van Riebeeck class. They had a complement of 47, including 6 officers. The submarines were modernized locally, receiving updated sonar and displays in the 1980s, with Emily Hobhouse finishing the refit in 1988, Johanna van der Merwe in 1990 and Maria van Riebeeck in 1992. In 1980, South Africa attempted to acquire two of Portugal's hulls.

South African submarine construction data
Hull no.	Name	Builder	Laid down	Launched	Commissioned	Fate
S97	SAS Spear (ex-Maria van Riebeeck)	Chantiers Dubigeon, Nantes	14 March 1968	18 March 1969	22 June 1970	Sold for scrap 2002
S98	SAS Umkhonto (ex-Emily Hobhouse)	Chantiers Dubigeon, Nantes	18 November 1968	24 October 1969	25 January 1971	Scrapped 2003
S99	SAS Assegaai (ex-Johanna van der Merwe)	Chantiers Dubigeon, Nantes	24 April 1969	21 July 1970	21 July 1971	Decommissioned 2003, converted to museum ship 2008

=== Spanish Navy ===
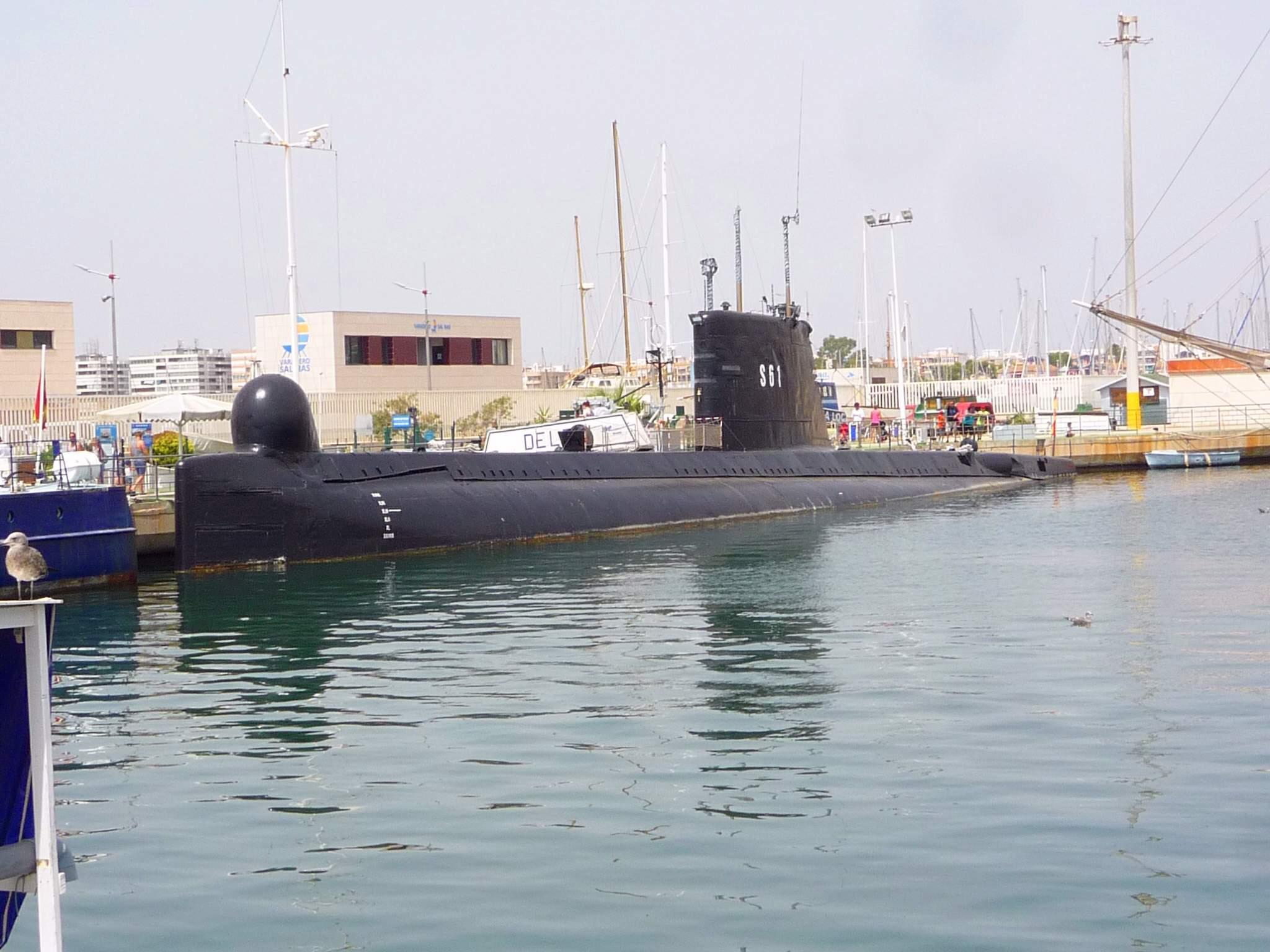
Delfín as a museum ship

As part of Spain's attempt to build up their shipbuilding industry in the post-World War II era, they sought to learn techniques from various nations by acquiring ships from them, such as American destroyers and submarines. Initially, the Spanish sough to acquire British Oberon-class submarines but failed to complete a deal after receiving a negative reaction from the British. The Spanish turned to the French and in an agreement signed on 16 July 1966, acquired the right to build Daphné-class submarines under license in Spain with design aid from France. Designated the Delfín class or the S-60 class by Spain, the vessels were of a modified design, measuring 57.78 m (189 ft 7 in) long with a draught of 4.6 m (15 ft 1 in) and displacing 869 t (855 long tons) surfaced and 1,069 t (1,052 long tons) submerged. The first two hulls were ordered in December 1966, followed by two more in March 1970. A fifth hull was planned, but never ordered. All four submarines were by built by Bazan at their Cartagena dockyard. The submarines were modernized at Cartagena between 1983 and 1988 where the navy replaced their DUUA 1 sonar forward with the DUUA 2A model and updated the torpedo fire control. The DUUA 2 was mounted forward in a dome on the bow like on the French submarines while the submarines kept the DUUA-1D sonar at the rear.

Delfin / S-60-class submarine construction data
Pennant	Name	Builder	Laid down	Launched	Commissioned	Fate
S61	Delfín	Bazan, Cartagena	13 August 1968	25 March 1972	3 May 1973	Decommissioned 2003, since 2004 a museum ship at Torrevieja
S62	Tonina	Bazan, Cartagena	2 March 1970	3 October 1972	10 July 1973	Decommissioned 2005, museum ship at Cartagena
S63	Marsopa	Bazan, Cartagena	19 March 1971	15 March 1974	12 April 1975	Decommissioned 2006. Sold for scrap.
S64	Narval	Bazan, Cartagena	24 April 1972	14 December 1974	22 November 1975	Decommissioned 2003. Sold for scrap.

== See also ==
Equivalent submarines of the same era

- Draken class
- Sutjeska class
- Hayashio class
