= SAS Spear =

History

South Africa
- Name: SAS Spear, ex Maria van Riebeeck
- Namesake: Maria van Riebeeck
- Builder: Dubigeon-Normandy, Nantes, France
- Laid down: 14 March 1968
- Launched: 18 March 1969
- Christened: by Elize Botha (wife of P.W. Botha)
- Commissioned: 22 June 1970
- Renamed: SAS Spear, 1999
- Home port: Simon's Town
- Identification: Pennant number:S97
- Fate: Scrapped, 2003

General characteristics
- Class & type: Daphné-class submarine
- Displacement: 869 t (855 long tons), surfaced; 1,043 t (1,027 long tons), submerged
- Length: 57.8 m (190 ft)
- Beam: 6.8 m (22 ft)
- Draught: 4.6 m (15 ft)
- Installed power: 2 × 1,300 bhp (969 kW) (diesel); 2 × 1,600 bhp (1,193 kW) (electric)
- Propulsion: 2 × propeller shafts; 2 × diesel engines, surfaced; 2 × electric motors, submerged
- Speed: 13.5 knots (25.0 km/h; 15.5 mph), surfaced; 16 knots (30 km/h; 18 mph), submerged
- Range: 4,500 nmi (8,300 km; 5,200 mi) at 5 knots (9.3 km/h; 5.8 mph), (snorkelling)
- Complement: 6 officers and 41 ratings
- Armament: 12 × 550 mm (21.7 in) torpedo tubes (8 bow, 4 stern)

SAS Spear (pennant number: S97), initially known as the SAS Maria van Riebeeck, was a Daphné-class submarine of the South African Navy (SAN). Built in France during the 1960s, the boat was the SAN's first submarine. It was scrapped in June–July 2003.

== Description ==
The submarine displaced 869 metric tons (855 long tons) surfaced and 1,043 metric tons (1,027 long tons) submerged. It measured 57.8 meters (189 ft 8 in) long, had a beam of 6.8 meters (22 ft 4 in) and a draft of 4.6 meters (15 ft 1 in). For surface running, the boat was powered by two SEMT Pielstick 1,300-brake-horsepower (969 kW) diesel engines, each driving a single propeller shaft. When submerged each propeller was driven by a 1,600-brake-horsepower (1,193 kW) electric motor. Spear could reach 13.5 knots (25.0 km/h; 15.5 mph) on the surface and 16 knots (30 km/h; 18 mph) underwater. While snorkelling, the boat had a range of 4,500 nmi (8,300 km; 5,200 mi) at 5 knots (9.3 km/h; 5.8 mph). It was armed with a dozen 550 mm (21.7 in) torpedo tubes, eight in the bow and four in the stern. Spear had a complement of 6 officers and 41 ratings.

== Construction and career ==
The boat was laid down at the Nantes shipyard of Dubigeon-Normandie on 14 March 1968, launched on 18 March 1969 and commissioned on 22 June 1970.

On 20 August 1970, Maria van Riebeeck collided with the French submarine Galatée (also a member of the Daphné class) off Toulon. Both submarines were badly damaged, with Galatée being forced to run aground to avoid sinking.

The boat received an upgraded sonar and electronics during a mid-life update that was completed in 1992. Spear was scrapped in Simon's Town by SA Metal and Machinery Co. (Pty) Ltd. during June–July 2003.
