= SAS Umkhonto =

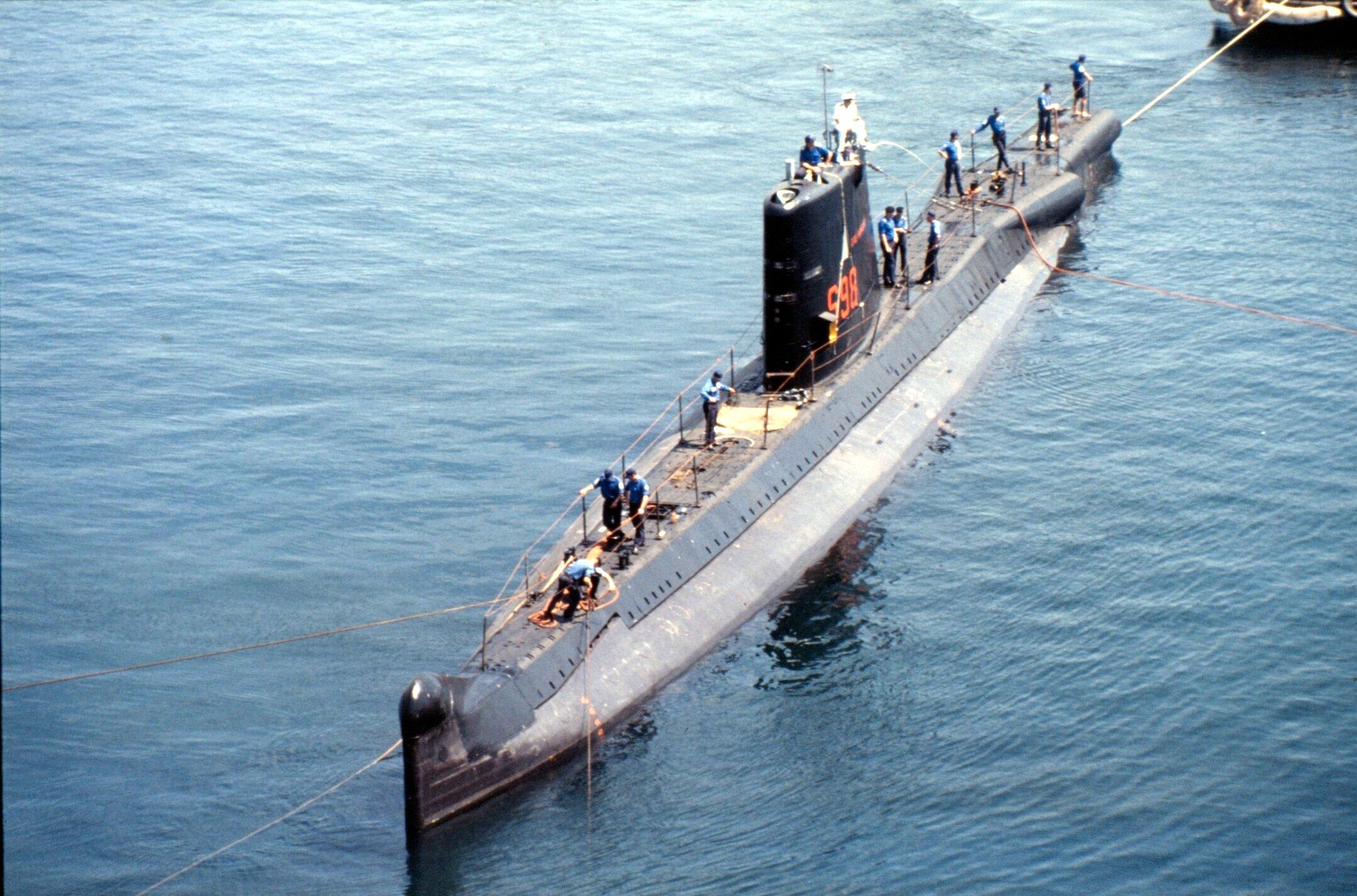
- SAS Emily Hobhouse c. 1994

History

South Africa
- Name: SAS Umkhonto
- Namesake: Emily Hobhouse was a British humanitarian in South Africa during the Boer War. Umkhonto is the Zulu word for "spear"
- Ordered: 1967
- Builder: Dubigeon-Normandie
- Launched: 19 June 1969
- Christened: SAS Emily Hobhouse
- Commissioned: 26 February 1971
- Decommissioned: 2003
- Out of service: 2003
- Renamed: SAS Umkhonto (1999)
- Home port: Simon's Town
- Identification: S 98
- Fate: Scrapped, 2008

General characteristics
- Class & type: Daphné-class submarine
- Displacement: 869 tonnes surfaced; 1,043 tonnes submerged
- Length: 57.75 m (189 ft 6 in)
- Beam: 6.74 m (22 ft 1 in)
- Draught: 5.25 m (17 ft 3 in)
- Propulsion: Diesel-electric, two shafts, 1,600 shp (1,200 kW)
- Speed: Submerged: 16 knots (30 km/h); Schnorcheling: 8 knots (15 km/h); Surfaced: 12 knots (22.2 km/h)
- Range: Surfaced: 10,000 nautical miles (20,000 km) at 7 knots (13 km/h)
- Endurance: 30 days
- Test depth: 300 m (980 ft)

SAS Umkhonto (S98), formerly SAS Emily Hobhouse, was the second of three French-built Daphné-class submarines ordered by the South African Navy in 1968. Laid down in December 1968 and launched on 24 October 1969 and commissioned into the South African Navy under the command of Lt Cdr Lambert Jackson "Woody" Woodburne on 26 February 1971. The submarine was decommissioned in 2003 and scrapped in 2008.

== Ship name ==
The first ships of the class in the French Navy were named after women, and the South African Navy followed this tradition. The submarine was christened SAS Emily Hobhouse after Emily Hobhouse, the British humanitarian and philanthropist who exposed the atrocious conditions into which some British concentration camps imprisoning the non-combatant Afrikaner population had deteriorated during the Boer War in South Africa.

Beginning in 1994, with the end of apartheid in South Africa, ships bearing names of noted European South African figures were renamed, and the vessel became SAS Umkhonto. Umkhonto is the Zulu word for spear.

== Operational history ==
In 1972, SAS Emily Hobhouse, under the command of Lt Cdr Lambert Jackson Woodburne, landed Special Forces troops, led by Commandant Jan Breytenbach near Dar es Salaam. The Special Forces team placed explosives on a bridge, next to power lines and other targets around town. While making the pickup rendezvous, the submarine snagged a fishing net and sank the fishing vessel dragging the net.

On 17 February 1982, SAS Emily Hobhouse was part of a submarine officer commanding course exercise that took place 80 nautical miles (150 km) off Cape Point. Her mission was to pass through the security screen provided by the frigates SAS President Kruger and SAS President Pretorius and simulate an attack on the replenishment ship, SAS Tafelberg, which the frigates were protecting. The heavy seas were causing clutter on the radar screens and the execution of a World War II-era convoy maneuver in the rough seas ended in a collision at 4:23am between Tafelberg and President Kruger which resulted in minor damage to Tafelberg and the sinking of President Kruger on the morning of 18 February with a loss of 16 lives. SAS Umkhonto was paid off in 2003 and scrapped in 2008.
