= HMS Fleetwood =

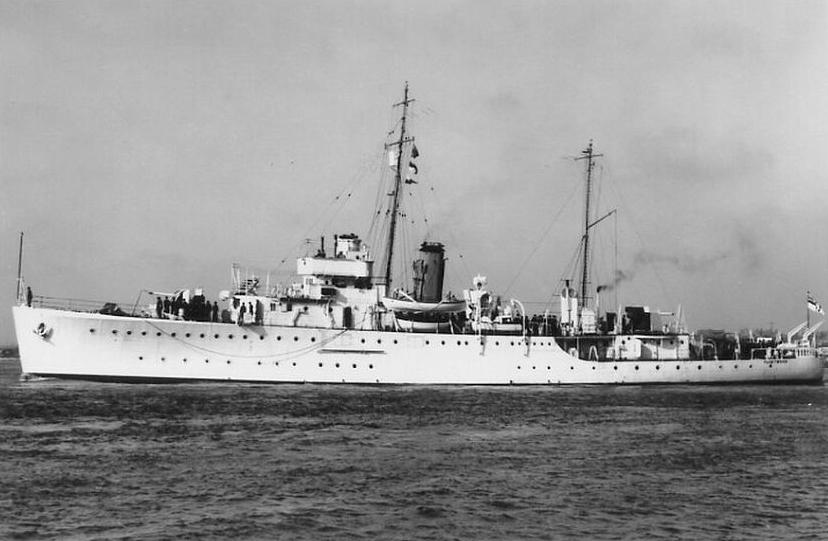
HMS Fleetwood (U47)

Two ships of the Royal Navy have been named HMS Fleetwood, after the town of Fleetwood. A third ship was planned as Fleetwood, but was renamed before being launched:

- HMS Fleetwood (1655) was a Royalist ship captured by the Parliamentarians in 1655 and renamed Wexford.
- HMS Fleetwood was to have been a Hunt-class minesweeper. She was renamed HMS Ford in 1918 and was launched later that year.
- HMS Fleetwood (U47) was a Grimsby-class sloop launched in 1936 and broken up after 1959.
