= J18 =

J18 may refer to:

== Vehicles ==
=== Locomotives ===
- GSR Class J18, an Irish steam locomotive
- LNER Class J18, a British steam locomotive class

=== Ships ===
- HMS Selkirk (J18), a Hunt-class minesweeper of the Royal Navy
- HSwMS Halland (J18), a Halland-class destroyer of the Swedish Navy
- INS Sandhayak (J18), a Sandhayak-class survey ship of the Indian Navy

== Other uses ==
- Carnival Against Capital, an anti-globalisation protest held on June 18, 1999
- County Route J18 (California)
- Elongated triangular cupola, a Johnson solid (J_{18})
- J18 Region, the highest level of under-18 ice hockey in Sweden
- Pneumonia

== See also ==
- 18-j, 2004 film
