= J57 =

J57 may refer to:

- J57 (rapper) (born 1983), American rapper
- HMS Bagshot (J57), a minesweeper of the Royal Navy
- Pratt & Whitney J57, a turbojet engine
- Triaugmented hexagonal prism
