= Forfar (disambiguation) =

Forfar is the county town of Angus, Scotland.

Forfar may also refer to:

- Forfar (Parliament of Scotland constituency), a pre-1707 constituency
- Forfar (UK Parliament constituency), a former county constituency in Scotland
- Earl of Forfar, a peerage title
- HMS Forfar, two Royal Navy ships

== People with the surname ==
- John Forfar (1916–2013), British paediatrician and academic
- Ronald Forfar, British actor
