= HMS Rugby =

Minesweeper of the Royal Navy

History

United Kingdom
- Builder: Dunlop Bremmer, Port Glasgow
- Launched: 6 September 1918
- Fate: Sold 25 November 1927 to Hughes Bolckow, Blyth, Northumberland

General characteristics
- Class & type: Hunt class minesweeper (1916), Aberdare sub-class
- Displacement: 800 long tons (813 t)
- Length: 213 ft (64.9 m) o/a
- Beam: 28 ft 6 in (8.7 m)
- Draught: 7 ft 6 in (2.3 m)
- Installed power: 2 × Yarrow boilers; 2,200 ihp (1,600 kW)
- Propulsion: 2 shafts; 2 triple-expansion steam engines
- Speed: 16 knots (30 km/h; 18 mph)
- Range: 1,500 nmi (2,800 km; 1,700 mi) at 15 knots (28 km/h; 17 mph)
- Complement: 74
- Armament: 1 × QF 4-inch (102 mm) gun; 1 × 12 pdr (76 mm (3 in)) anti-aircraft gun

HMS Rugby was a Hunt-class minesweeper built for the Royal Navy during World War I. Completed in 1918, the ship was sold for scrap in 1927.

== Design and description ==
The Aberdare sub-class were enlarged versions of the original Hunt-class ships with a more powerful armament. The ships displaced 750 long tons (760 t) at normal load and 930 long tons (940 t) at full load. They measured 231 feet (70.4 m) long overall with a beam of 28 feet 6 inches (8.7 m) and a draught of 7 feet 6 inches (2.3 m). The ships' complement consisted of 74 officers and ratings.

The ships had two vertical triple-expansion steam engines, each driving one shaft using steam provided by two Yarrow boilers. The engines produced a total of 2,200 indicated horsepower (1,600 kW) and gave a maximum speed of 16 knots (30 km/h; 18 mph). They carried a maximum of 185 long tons (188 t) of coal which gave them a range of 1,500 nautical miles (2,800 km; 1,700 mi) at 15 knots (28 km/h; 17 mph).

The Aberdare sub-class was armed with a quick-firing (QF) four-inch (102 mm) gun forward of the bridge and a QF twelve-pounder (3-inch (76.2 mm)) anti-aircraft gun aft. Some ships were fitted with QF six-pounder (2.2-inch (57 mm)) Hotchkiss guns or QF three-pounder (1.5-inch (37 mm)) Hotchkiss guns in lieu of the twelve-pounder.

== Construction and career ==
Rugby, the first ship of her name in the Royal Navy, was laid down with the name of Filey by Dunlop Bremmer at their shipyard in Port Glasgow, Scotland. The ship was renamed Rugby in 1918 and launched on 6 September 1918. She was sold on 25 November 1927 to Hughes Bolckow to be broken up in Blyth, Northumberland.

== See also ==
- Rugby, Warwickshire

== Bibliography ==
- Cocker, M. P. (1993). Mine Warfare Vessels of the Royal Navy: 1908 to Date. Airlife Publishing. ISBN 1-85310-328-4.
- Colledge, J. J.; Warlow, Ben & Bush, Steve (2020). Ships of the Royal Navy: The Complete Record of all Fighting Ships of the Royal Navy from the 15th Century to the Present (5th revised and updated ed.). Seaforth Publishing. ISBN 978-1-5267-9327-0.
- Lenton, H. T. (1998). British & Empire Warships of the Second World War. Naval Institute Press. ISBN 1-55750-048-7.
- Preston, Antony (1985). "Great Britain and Empire Forces". In Gray, Randal (ed.). Conway's All the World's Fighting Ships 1906–1921. Naval Institute Press. pp. 1–104. ISBN 0-85177-245-5.
