= HMS Gretna =

UK Royal Navy ship

History

United Kingdom
- Builder: Joseph R Eltringham, South Shields
- Launched: 11 April 1918
- Fate: Sold to Alloa Ship Breaking Co, Rosyth 3 October 1928

General characteristics
- Class & type: Hunt-class minesweeper; Aberdare sub-class
- Displacement: 800 long tons (813 t)
- Length: 213 ft (64.9 m) o/a
- Beam: 28 ft 6 in (8.7 m)
- Draught: 7 ft 6 in (2.3 m)
- Installed power: 2 × Yarrow boilers; 2,200 ihp (1,600 kW)
- Propulsion: 2 shafts; 2 triple-expansion steam engines
- Speed: 16 knots (30 km/h; 18 mph)
- Range: 1,500 nmi (2,800 km; 1,700 mi) at 15 knots (28 km/h; 17 mph)
- Complement: 74
- Armament: 1 × QF 4-inch (102 mm) gun; 1 × 12 pdr (76 mm (3 in)) anti-aircraft gun

HMS Gretna was a Hunt-class minesweeper built for the Royal Navy during World War I. Completed in 1918, the ship was sold for scrap in 1928.

== Design and description ==
The Aberdare sub-class were enlarged versions of the original Hunt-class ships with a more powerful armament. The ships displaced 750 long tons (760 t) at normal load and 930 long tons (940 t) at full load. They measured 231 feet (70.4 m) long overall with a beam of 28 feet 6 inches (8.7 m) and a draught of 7 feet 6 inches (2.3 m). The ships' complement consisted of 74 officers and ratings.

The ships had two vertical triple-expansion steam engines, each driving one shaft using steam provided by two Yarrow boilers. The engines produced a total of 2,200 indicated horsepower (1,600 kW) and gave a maximum speed of 16 knots (30 km/h; 18 mph). They carried a maximum of 185 long tons (188 t) of coal which gave them a range of 1,500 nautical miles (2,800 km; 1,700 mi) at 15 knots (28 km/h; 17 mph).

The Aberdare sub-class was armed with a quick-firing (QF) four-inch (102 mm) gun forward of the bridge and a QF twelve-pounder (3-inch (76.2 mm)) anti-aircraft gun aft. Some ships were fitted with QF six-pounder (2.2-inch (57 mm)) Hotchkiss guns or QF three-pounder (1.5-inch (37 mm)) Hotchkiss guns in lieu of the twelve-pounder.

== Construction and career ==
Gretna, the first ship of her name in the Royal Navy, was built by Joseph R. Eltringham at their shipyard in South Shields. The ship was launched on 11 April 1918.

Gretna joined the 3rd Fleet Sweeping Flotilla, attached to the Grand Fleet. She remained as part of the 3rd Sweeping Flotilla, based at Granton, Edinburgh at the end of the war on 11 November 1918. Gretna was still listed as part of the 3rd Fleet Sweeping Flotilla in April 1919, but had moved to the 21st Fleet Sweeping Flotilla, based in Norway, by May that year. The minesweeper was paid off on 24 October 1919.

Gretna, part of the Central Reserve based at Chatham, took part in the Royal Fleet Review at Spithead on 26 July 1924.

In February 1928, as part of a reduction of the numbers of obsolete minesweepers held in reserve, with the Central Reserve being merged with the ordinary reserve based at the Nore, Gretna was ordered to be placed on the sale list. Gretna was sold on 3 October 1928 to Alloa Shipbreaking Company to be broken up in Rosyth.

== See also ==
- Gretna, Scotland

== Bibliography ==
- Cocker, M. P. (1993). Mine Warfare Vessels of the Royal Navy: 1908 to Date. Airlife Publishing. ISBN 1-85310-328-4.
- Colledge, J. J.; Warlow, Ben & Bush, Steve (2020). Ships of the Royal Navy: The Complete Record of all Fighting Ships of the Royal Navy from the 15th Century to the Present (5th revised and updated ed.). Seaforth Publishing. ISBN 978-1-5267-9327-0.
- Dorling, Taprell (1938). Swept Channels: being an account of the work of the minesweepers in the Great War. London: Hodder and Stoughton Limited.
- Lenton, H. T. (1998). British & Empire Warships of the Second World War. Naval Institute Press. ISBN 1-55750-048-7.
- Preston, Antony (1985). "Great Britain and Empire Forces". In Gray, Randal (ed.). Conway's All the World's Fighting Ships 1906–1921. Naval Institute Press. pp. 1–104. ISBN 0-85177-245-5.
