= Clonmel (disambiguation) =

Clonmel is a county town in Ireland, home of:

- Clonmel Commercials, a Gaelic football club
- Clonmel GAA Ground, a GAA stadium, home of the Clonmel Commercials and other sporting clubs
- Clonmel Óg GAA, a Gaelic football club
- Clonmel Racecourse
- Clonmel (UK Parliament constituency) once a parliamentary district

Clonmel may also refer to:

- Clonmel, Kansas, a community in the United States
- HMS Clonmel (1918), a ship from World War I
- PS Clonmel, a paddle steamer wrecked on the coast of Victoria, Australia in 1841
