= HMS Forfar =

HMS Forfar has been the name of two Royal Navy ships:

- HMS Forfar (1918), a Hunt-class minesweeper launched 1918 and sold in 1922
- HMS Forfar (F30), formerly the liner SS Montrose, requisitioned as an armed merchant cruiser in 1939 and sunk in 1940
