= HMS Bloxham =

Minesweeper of the Royal Navy

History

United Kingdom
- Builder: Ayrshire Dockyard Company
- Launched: 11 September 1919
- Fate: Sold incomplete 23 October 1923 to Lithgow, Port Glasgow

General characteristics
- Class & type: Hunt-class minesweeper (1916), Aberdare sub-class
- Displacement: 710 tons
- Length: 231 ft (70 m)
- Beam: 28 ft (8.5 m)
- Draught: 8 ft (2.4 m)
- Propulsion: Yarrow-type boilers, Vertical triple-expansion engines, 2 shafts, 2,200 ihp
- Speed: max 16 knots
- Range: 140 tons coal
- Complement: 73 men
- Armament: 1 × QF 4-inch (102 mm) forward; 76 mm (3.0 in) aft; 2 × twin 0.303 inch machine guns

HMS Bloxham was a Hunt-class minesweeper of the Royal Navy from World War I. She was originally to be named Brixham, but this was changed to avoid any conflict between the vessel name and a coastal location.

== See also ==
- Bloxham, Oxfordshire
