= HMS Elgin (J39) =

Minesweeper of the Royal Navy

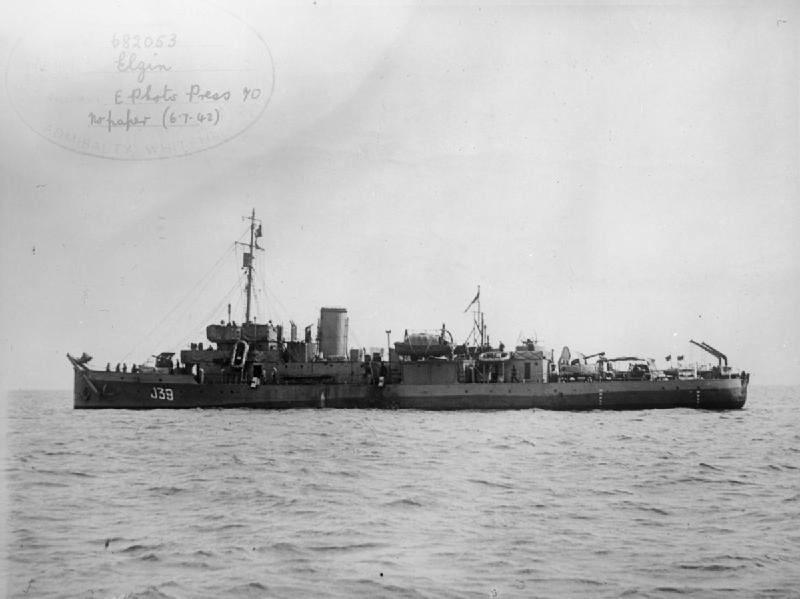

History

United Kingdom
- Builder: William Simons & Company, Renfrew
- Launched: 3 March 1919
- Identification: Pennant number: J39
- Fate: Sold 20 March 1945, broken up King, Gateshead

General characteristics
- Class & type: Hunt-class minesweeper, Aberdare sub-class
- Displacement: 800 long tons (813 t)
- Length: 213 ft (65 m) o/a
- Beam: 28 ft 6 in (8.69 m)
- Draught: 7 ft 6 in (2.29 m)
- Installed power: 2 × Yarrow boilers; 2,200 ihp (1,600 kW)
- Propulsion: 2 shafts; 2 vertical triple-expansion steam engines
- Speed: 16 knots (30 km/h; 18 mph)
- Range: 1,500 nmi (2,800 km; 1,700 mi) at 15 knots (28 km/h; 17 mph)
- Complement: 74
- Armament: 1 × QF 4-inch (102 mm) gun; 1 × 76 mm (3.0 in) anti-aircraft gun

HMS Elgin was a Hunt-class minesweeper of the Aberdare sub-class built for the Royal Navy during World War I. She was not finished in time to participate in the First World War. A mine badly damaged her in 1944; she was sold for scrap in 1945.

== Design and description ==
The Aberdare sub-class were enlarged versions of the original Hunt-class ships and carried more powerful armament. The ships displaced 800 long tons (810 t) at normal load. They had a length between perpendiculars of 220 feet (67.1 m), and measured 231 feet (70.4 m) long overall. The Aberdares had a beam of 26 feet 6 inches (8.1 m) and a draught of 7 feet 6 inches (2.3 m). The ships' complement consisted of 74 officers and ratings.

The ships had two vertical triple-expansion steam engines, each driving one shaft, using steam provided by two Yarrow boilers. The engines produced a total of 2,200 indicated horsepower (1,600 kW) and gave a maximum speed of 16 knots (30 km/h; 18 mph). They carried a maximum of 185 long tons (188 t) of coal which gave them a range of 1,500 nautical miles (2,800 km; 1,700 mi) at 15 knots (28 km/h; 17 mph).

The Aberdare sub-class was armed with a quick-firing (QF) four-inch (102 mm) gun forward of the bridge and a QF twelve-pounder (76.2 mm) anti-aircraft gun aft. Some ships were fitted with six- or three-pounder guns in lieu of the twelve-pounder.

== Construction and career ==
HMS Elgin was built by the William Simons & Company at their shipyard in Renfrew. She was originally to be named Troon, but was renamed before launch to avoid possible misunderstandings of having vessels named after coastal locations. On 4 May 1944, Elgin was nine miles east of the Isle of Portland, when she triggered an acoustic mine that damaged her severely. She was towed to Portsmouth where she was scrapped in 1945.

== See also ==
- Elgin, Moray, Scotland
