= HMS Swindon =

Minesweeper of the Royal Navy

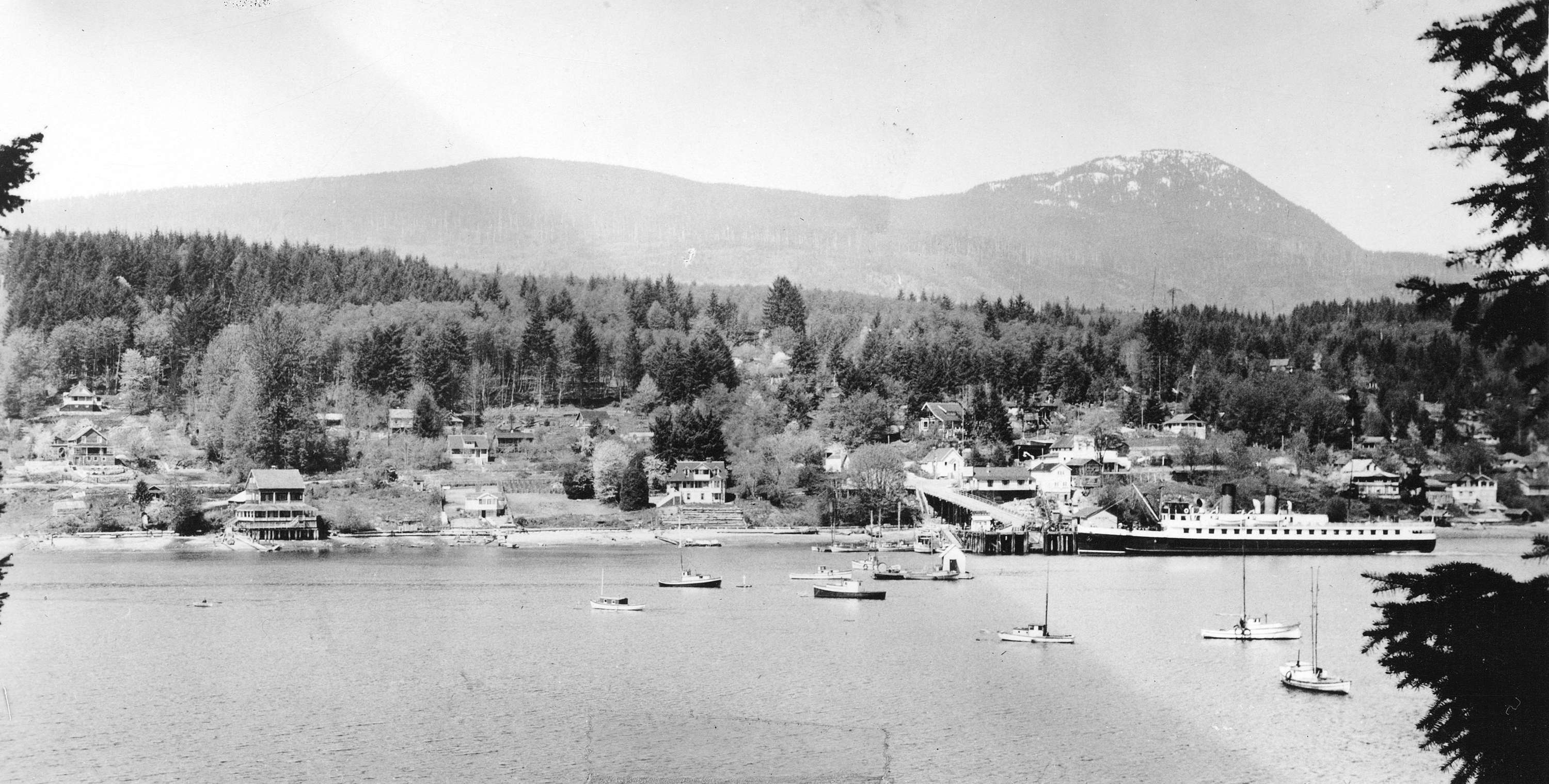
- As Lady Cecilia at Gibsons Landing, British Columbia, circa 1930

History

United Kingdom
- Builder: Ardrossan Dry Dock & Shipbuilding Company
- Launched: 25 December 1918
- Fate: Sold 1 December 1921; renamed Lady Cecilia

General characteristics
- Class & type: Hunt-class minesweeper, Aberdare sub-class
- Displacement: 800 long tons (813 t)
- Length: 213 ft (65 m) o/a
- Beam: 28 ft 6 in (8.69 m)
- Draught: 7 ft 6 in (2.29 m)
- Installed power: 2 × Yarrow boilers; 2,200 ihp (1,600 kW)
- Propulsion: 2 shafts; 2 vertical triple-expansion steam engines
- Speed: 16 knots (30 km/h; 18 mph)
- Range: 1,500 nmi (2,800 km; 1,700 mi) at 15 knots (28 km/h; 17 mph)
- Complement: 74
- Armament: 1 × QF 4-inch (102 mm) gun; 1 × 76 mm (3.0 in) anti-aircraft gun

HMS Swindon was a Hunt-class minesweeper of the Aberdare sub-class built for the Royal Navy during World War I. She was not finished in time to participate in the First World War and was sold into civilian service in 1921.

== Design and description ==
The Aberdare sub-class were enlarged versions of the original Hunt-class ships with a more powerful armament. The ships displaced 800 long tons (810 t) at normal load. They had a length between perpendiculars of 220 feet (67.1 m) and measured 231 feet (70.4 m) long overall. The Aberdares had a beam of 26 feet 6 inches (8.1 m) and a draught of 7 feet 6 inches (2.3 m). The ships' complement consisted of 74 officers and ratings.

The ships had two vertical triple-expansion steam engines, each driving one shaft, using steam provided by two Yarrow boilers. The engines produced a total of 2,200 indicated horsepower (1,600 kW) and gave a maximum speed of 16 knots (30 km/h; 18 mph). They carried a maximum of 185 long tons (188 t) of coal which gave them a range of 1,500 nautical miles (2,800 km; 1,700 mi) at 15 knots (28 km/h; 17 mph).

The Aberdare sub-class was armed with a quick-firing (QF) four-inch (102 mm) gun forward of the bridge and a QF twelve-pounder (76.2 mm) anti-aircraft gun aft. Some ships were fitted with six- or three-pounder guns in lieu of the twelve-pounder.

== Construction and career ==
Swindon was renamed from HMS Bantry in 1918 to avoid any conflict between the vessel name and a coastal location. In 1921 she was sold off and converted to a coastal passenger/freight steamer SS Lady Cecilia by the Coaster Construction Co of Montrose, Scotland for the Union Steamship Co of British Columbia. She was laid up and sold to Coast Ferries in 1951, then scrapped at Gambier Island, BC in 1952.

== See also ==
- Swindon, Wiltshire
