= HMS Fareham =

Minesweeper of the Royal Navy

History

United Kingdom
- Builder: Dunlop Bremmer, Port Glasgow
- Launched: 7 June 1918
- Identification: Pennant number J89 / N89
- Fate: Sold 24 August 1948. Broken up Thos. W. Ward, Hayle

General characteristics
- Class & type: Hunt-class minesweeper, Aberdare sub-class
- Displacement: 800 long tons (813 t)
- Length: 213 ft (65 m) o/a
- Beam: 28 ft 6 in (8.69 m)
- Draught: 7 ft 6 in (2.29 m)
- Installed power: 2 × Yarrow boilers; 2,200 ihp (1,600 kW)
- Propulsion: 2 shafts; 2 vertical triple-expansion steam engines
- Speed: 16 knots (30 km/h; 18 mph)
- Range: 1,500 nmi (2,800 km; 1,700 mi) at 15 knots (28 km/h; 17 mph)
- Complement: 74
- Armament: 1 × QF 4-inch (102 mm) gun; 1 × 76 mm (3.0 in) anti-aircraft gun

HMS Fareham was a Hunt-class minesweeper of the Aberdare sub-class built for the Royal Navy during World War I. She was not finished in time to participate in the First World War and survived the Second World War to be sold for scrap in 1948.

== Design and description ==
The Aberdare sub-class were enlarged versions of the original Hunt-class ships with a more powerful armament. The ships displaced 800 long tons (810 t) at normal load. They had a length between perpendiculars of 220 feet (67.1 m) and measured 231 feet (70.4 m) long overall. The Aberdares had a beam of 26 feet 6 inches (8.1 m) and a draught of 7 feet 6 inches (2.3 m). The ships' complement consisted of 74 officers and ratings.

The ships had two vertical triple-expansion steam engines, each driving one shaft, using steam provided by two Yarrow boilers. The engines produced a total of 2,200 indicated horsepower (1,600 kW) and gave a maximum speed of 16 knots (30 km/h; 18 mph). They carried a maximum of 185 long tons (188 t) of coal which gave them a range of 1,500 nautical miles (2,800 km; 1,700 mi) at 15 knots (28 km/h; 17 mph).

The Aberdare sub-class was armed with a quick-firing (QF) four-inch (102 mm) gun forward of the bridge and a QF twelve-pounder (76.2 mm) anti-aircraft gun aft. Some ships were fitted with six- or three-pounder guns in lieu of the twelve-pounder. Ships that served in the Second World War initially had two machine guns installed in the bridge wings. Later the four-inch gun was replaced by another twelve-pounder and the machine guns were replaced by Oerlikon 20 mm cannon. Later still another pair of Oerlikons was mounted in the stern.

== Construction and career ==
In 1944–45 she was named St Angelo II, acting as a minesweeping base ship.

== See also ==
- Fareham
