= HMS Ross =

Minesweeper of the Royal Navy

History

United Kingdom
- Name: HMS Ross
- Builder: Lobnitz, Renfrew
- Launched: 12 June 1919
- Fate: Sold for scrap 13 March 1947

General characteristics
- Class & type: Hunt-class minesweeper
- Displacement: 800 long tons (813 t)
- Length: 213 ft (65 m) o/a
- Beam: 28 ft 6 in (8.69 m)
- Draught: 7 ft 6 in (2.29 m)
- Installed power: 2 × Yarrow boilers; 2,200 ihp (1,600 kW)
- Propulsion: 2 shafts; 2 vertical triple-expansion steam engines
- Speed: 16 knots (30 km/h; 18 mph)
- Range: 1,500 nmi (2,800 km; 1,700 mi) at 15 knots (28 km/h; 17 mph)
- Complement: 74
- Armament: 1 × QF 4-inch (102 mm) gun; 1 × 76 mm (3.0 in) anti-aircraft gun

HMS Ross was a Hunt-class minesweeper of the Aberdare sub-class built for the Royal Navy during World War I. She was not finished in time to participate in the First World War and survived the Second World War to be sold for scrap in 1947.

== Design and description ==
The Aberdare sub-class were enlarged versions of the original Hunt-class ships with a more powerful armament. The ships displaced 800 long tons (810 t) at normal load. They had a length between perpendiculars of 220 feet (67.1 m) and measured 231 feet (70.4 m) long overall. The Aberdares had a beam of 26 feet 6 inches (8.1 m) and a draught of 7 feet 6 inches (2.3 m). The ships' complement consisted of 74 officers and ratings.

The ships had two vertical triple-expansion steam engines, each driving one shaft, using steam provided by two Yarrow boilers. The engines produced a total of 2,200 indicated horsepower (1,600 kW) and gave a maximum speed of 16 knots (30 km/h; 18 mph). They carried a maximum of 185 long tons (188 t) of coal which gave them a range of 1,500 nautical miles (2,800 km; 1,700 mi) at 15 knots (28 km/h; 17 mph).

The Aberdare sub-class was armed with a quick-firing (QF) four-inch (102 mm) gun forward of the bridge and a QF twelve-pounder (76.2 mm) anti-aircraft gun aft. Some ships were fitted with six- or three-pounder guns in lieu of the twelve-pounder.

== Construction and career ==
HMS Ross was built by the Lobnitz at their shipyard in Renfrew. She was originally called HMS Ramsey, but was renamed prior to launch. So far she has been the only ship of the Navy to bear the name Ross, in this case after the Ross hunt.

In 1940, Ross was serving with the 5th Minesweeping Flotilla. With the rest of her flotilla, she took part in Operation Dynamo, the evacuation of the British Expeditionary Force from Dunkirk, making a number of trips and taking off more than 1,000 men. In 1941, Ross had a narrow escape when attacked by a German bomber a few miles out of Aberdeen: a bomb passed through her bow without exploding, leaving its tail fin behind.

In 1941, during Warship Week, the Admiralty asked all the towns and counties in the country to adopt a ship. As a result, on 6 December 1941, Ross was formally adopted by Ross-on-Wye and the association remained until she was decommissioned in 1945. Ross was then finally sold for scrap on 13 March 1947.

An original Ship's Crest was presented to the town of Ross-on-Wye and it adorned the Mayor's chair in the Town Council Chamber for many years. More recently it has been loaned to TS Ross, the local Sea Cadet Unit, for safe keeping and it can be viewed by the public on their maindeck.
