= HMS Ford =

Minesweeper of the Royal Navy

History

United Kingdom
- Builder: Dunlop Bremner, Port Glasgow
- Launched: 19 October 1918
- Out of service: Sold October 1928 to Townsend Bros and resold 8 December 1928 to become Forde
- Fate: Scrapped, 1 May 1954 at Málaga

General characteristics
- Class & type: Hunt-class minesweeper, Aberdare sub-class
- Displacement: 800 long tons (813 t)
- Length: 213 ft (65 m) o/a
- Beam: 28 ft 6 in (8.69 m)
- Draught: 7 ft 6 in (2.29 m)
- Installed power: 2 × Yarrow boilers; 2,200 ihp (1,600 kW)
- Propulsion: 2 shafts; 2 vertical triple-expansion steam engines
- Speed: 16 knots (30 km/h; 18 mph)
- Complement: 74
- Armament: 1 × QF 4-inch (102 mm) gun; 1 × 76 mm (3.0 in) anti-aircraft gun

HMS Ford was a Hunt-class minesweeper of the Aberdare sub-class built for the Royal Navy during World War I.

== Design and description ==
The Aberdare sub-class were enlarged versions of the original Hunt-class ships with a more powerful armament. The ships displaced 800 long tons (810 t) at normal load. They measured 231 feet (70.4 m) long overall with a beam of 26 feet 6 inches (8.1 m). They had a draught of 7 feet 6 inches (2.3 m). The ships' complement consisted of 74 officers and ratings.

The ships had two vertical triple-expansion steam engines, each driving one shaft, using steam provided by two Yarrow boilers. The engines produced a total of 2,200 indicated horsepower (1,600 kW) and gave a maximum speed of 16 knots (30 km/h; 18 mph). They carried a maximum of 185 long tons (188 t) of coal which gave them a range of 1,500 nautical miles (2,800 km; 1,700 mi) at 15 knots (28 km/h; 17 mph).

The Aberdare sub-class was armed with a quick-firing (QF) four-inch (102 mm) gun forward of the bridge and a QF twelve-pounder (76.2 mm) anti-aircraft gun aft. Some ships were fitted with six- or three-pounder guns in lieu of the twelve-pounder.

== Construction and career ==
Ford was built by Dunlop Bremmer in their Port Glasgow shipyard. The ship was renamed from HMS Fleetwood prior to being launched in 1918.

== Service as Forde ==
In 1928 she was sold to Townsend Bros and converted into a car ferry between Dover and Calais, fitted with a stern door which folded down onto the quay. However, this was unusable, and the cars were craned on. She could carry 165 passengers and 26 cars. Two general saloons, a ladies’ saloon and three private state rooms were constructed.

During the Second World War, Forde served under the Admiralty as a salvage vessel. Afterwards she was refitted at Southampton and returned to Dover as a car ferry on 12 April 1947. She was withdrawn in October 1949, sold to Bland Line, renamed Gibel Tarik and finished her days as a car ferry between Gibraltar and Tangier, Morocco, finally being withdrawn in 1954.
