= HMS Badminton (1918) =

Minesweeper of the Royal Navy

History

United Kingdom
- Name: HMS Badminton
- Builder: Ardrossan Dry Dock & Shipbuilding Company
- Launched: 18 March 1918
- Fate: Sold 19 May 1928 to Thos. W. Ward, Inverkeithing

General characteristics
- Class & type: Hunt-class minesweeper, Aberdare sub-class
- Displacement: 800 long tons (813 t)
- Length: 213 ft (65 m) o/a
- Beam: 28 ft 6 in (8.69 m)
- Draught: 7 ft 6 in (2.29 m)
- Installed power: 2 × Yarrow boilers; 2,200 ihp (1,600 kW)
- Propulsion: 2 shafts; 2 vertical triple-expansion steam engines
- Speed: 16 knots (30 km/h; 18 mph)
- Range: 1,500 nmi (2,800 km; 1,700 mi) at 15 knots (28 km/h; 17 mph)
- Complement: 74
- Armament: 1 × QF 4-inch (102 mm) gun; 1 × 76 mm (3.0 in) anti-aircraft gun

HMS Badminton was a Hunt-class minesweeper of the Aberdare sub-class built for the Royal Navy during World War I. She was not finished in time to participate in the First World War and was sold for scrap in 1928.

== Design and description ==
The Aberdare sub-class were enlarged versions of the original Hunt-class ships with a more powerful armament. The ships displaced 800 long tons (810 t) at normal load. They had a length between perpendiculars of 220 feet (67.1 m) and measured 231 feet (70.4 m) long overall. The Aberdares had a beam of 26 feet 6 inches (8.1 m) and a draught of 7 feet 6 inches (2.3 m). The ships' complement consisted of 74 officers and ratings.

The ships had two vertical triple-expansion steam engines, each driving one shaft, using steam provided by two Yarrow boilers. The engines produced a total of 2,200 indicated horsepower (1,600 kW) and gave a maximum speed of 16 knots (30 km/h; 18 mph). They carried a maximum of 185 long tons (188 t) of coal which gave them a range of 1,500 nautical miles (2,800 km; 1,700 mi) at 15 knots (28 km/h; 17 mph).

The Aberdare sub-class was armed with a quick-firing (QF) four-inch (102 mm) gun forward of the bridge and a QF twelve-pounder (76.2 mm) anti-aircraft gun aft. Some ships were fitted with six- or three-pounder guns in lieu of the twelve-pounder.

== Construction and career ==
HMS Badminton was built by the Ardrossan Dry Dock & Shipbuilding Company and launched on 18 March 1918. Badminton was listed as part of the 7th (North Sea) Minesweeping Flotilla, based at Grimsby at the end of the war. After the war ended, the 7th Flotilla, including Badminton, was deployed to Ijmuiden in the Netherlands to help to clear the large German minefields off the Dutch coast. In the early 1920s, Badminton took part in coastal patrols off Ireland, mainly in supply and support role to Coastguard stations, but also targeting possible gun smuggling.
