= HMS Bagshot =

Minesweeper of the Royal Navy

History

United Kingdom
- Builder: Ardrossan Dry Dock & Shipbuilding Company
- Launched: 23 May 1918
- Commissioned: 1 May 1919
- Renamed: Temporarily became depot ship Medway II 1 April 1945 to 28 February 1946
- Identification: Pennant number: J57/N57
- Fate: Sold 1947 to Greek shipbreakers; sunk by a mine 1 September 1951 off Corfu while under tow

General characteristics
- Class & type: Hunt-class minesweeper, Aberdare sub-class
- Displacement: 800 long tons (813 t)
- Length: 213 ft (65 m) o/a
- Beam: 28 ft 6 in (8.69 m)
- Draught: 7 ft 6 in (2.29 m)
- Installed power: 2 × Yarrow boilers; 2,200 ihp (1,600 kW)
- Propulsion: 2 shafts; 2 vertical triple-expansion steam engines
- Speed: 16 knots (30 km/h; 18 mph)
- Range: 1,500 nmi (2,800 km; 1,700 mi) at 15 knots (28 km/h; 17 mph)
- Complement: 74
- Armament: 1 × QF 4-inch (102 mm) gun; 1 × 76 mm (3.0 in) anti-aircraft gun

HMS Bagshot was a Hunt-class minesweeper of the Aberdare sub-class built for the Royal Navy during World War I. She was not completed in time to participate in the First World War, but survived World War II, and was sold for scrap in 1947.

== Design and description ==
The Aberdare sub-class were enlarged versions of the original Hunt-class ships with a more powerful armament. The ships displaced 800 long tons (810 t) at normal load. They had a length between perpendiculars of 220 feet (67.1 m) and measured 231 feet (70.4 m) long overall. The Aberdares had a beam of 26 feet 6 inches (8.1 m) and a draught of 7 feet 6 inches (2.3 m). The ships' complement consisted of 74 officers and ratings.

The ships had two vertical triple-expansion steam engines, each driving one shaft, using steam provided by two Yarrow boilers. The engines produced a total of 2,200 indicated horsepower (1,600 kW) and gave a maximum speed of 16 knots (30 km/h; 18 mph). They carried a maximum of 185 long tons (188 t) of coal which gave them a range of 1,500 nautical miles (2,800 km; 1,700 mi) at 15 knots (28 km/h; 17 mph).

The Aberdare sub-class was armed with a quick-firing (QF) four-inch (102 mm) gun forward of the bridge and a QF twelve-pounder (76.2 mm) anti-aircraft gun aft. Some ships were fitted with six- or three-pounder guns in lieu of the twelve-pounder.

== Construction and career ==
HMS Bagshot was built by the Ardrossan Dry Dock & Shipbuilding Company and was launched on 23 May 1918. She temporarily became depot ship Medway II 1 April 1945 to 28 February 1946.

== See also ==
- Bagshot, Surrey
