= HMS Selkirk =

Minesweeper of the Royal Navy

History

United Kingdom
- Builder: Murdoch & Murray, Port Glasgow
- Laid down: 5 March 1918
- Launched: 2 December 1918
- Commissioned: 17 March 1919
- Identification: Pennant number: J18
- Motto: "Hold fast"
- Honours and awards: North Sea 1939-45; Atlantic 1939-45; Normandy 1944
- Fate: Sold 17 May 1947 to Dohmen & Habets, broken up in Liège
- Badge: On a field per fess black and white a Buckle, Silver piercing a scallop shell Gold.

General characteristics
- Class & type: Hunt-class minesweeper, Aberdare sub-class
- Displacement: 800 long tons (813 t)
- Length: 213 ft (65 m) o/a
- Beam: 28 ft 6 in (8.69 m)
- Draught: 7 ft 6 in (2.29 m)
- Installed power: 2 × Yarrow boilers; 2,200 ihp (1,600 kW)
- Propulsion: 2 shafts; 2 vertical triple-expansion steam engines
- Speed: 16 knots (30 km/h; 18 mph)
- Range: 1,500 nmi (2,800 km; 1,700 mi) at 15 knots (28 km/h; 17 mph)
- Complement: 74
- Armament: 1 × QF 4-inch (102 mm) gun; 1 × 76 mm (3.0 in) anti-aircraft gun

HMS Selkirk was a Hunt-class minesweeper of the Aberdare sub-class built for the Royal Navy during World War I. She was not finished in time to participate in the First World War and survived the Second World War to be sold for scrap in 1947.

== Design and description ==
The Aberdare sub-class were enlarged versions of the original Hunt-class ships with a more powerful armament. The ships displaced 800 long tons (810 t) at normal load. They had a length between perpendiculars of 220 feet (67.1 m) and measured 231 feet (70.4 m) long overall. The Aberdares had a beam of 26 feet 6 inches (8.1 m) and a draught of 7 feet 6 inches (2.3 m). The ships' complement consisted of 74 officers and ratings.

The ships had two vertical triple-expansion steam engines, each driving one shaft, using steam provided by two Yarrow boilers. The engines produced a total of 2,200 indicated horsepower (1,600 kW) and gave a maximum speed of 16 knots (30 km/h; 18 mph). They carried a maximum of 185 long tons (188 t) of coal which gave them a range of 1,500 nautical miles (2,800 km; 1,700 mi) at 15 knots (28 km/h; 17 mph).

The Aberdare sub-class was armed with a quick-firing (QF) four-inch (102 mm) gun forward of the bridge and a QF twelve-pounder (76.2 mm) anti-aircraft gun aft. Some ships were fitted with six- or three-pounder guns in lieu of the twelve-pounder.

== Construction and career ==
The ship was named after the Scottish town of Selkirk.

Following a successful Warship Week National Savings campaign in March 1942 she was adopted by the civil community of Thorne, near Doncaster in the West Riding of Yorkshire.
