= Dunlop Bremner & Company =

Defunct Scottish shipyard

Dunlop, Bremner & Company was a shipyard at Port Glasgow on the River Clyde, in Scotland, which was purchased by Lithgows in 1919 but continued to trade under its own name until 1926.

The company's Inch Yard was responsible for building both civil and naval vessels, some for the Royal Navy, including Hunt-class and Racecourse-class minesweepers.
