= Hunt-class minesweeper (1916) =

1917 class of British minesweepers

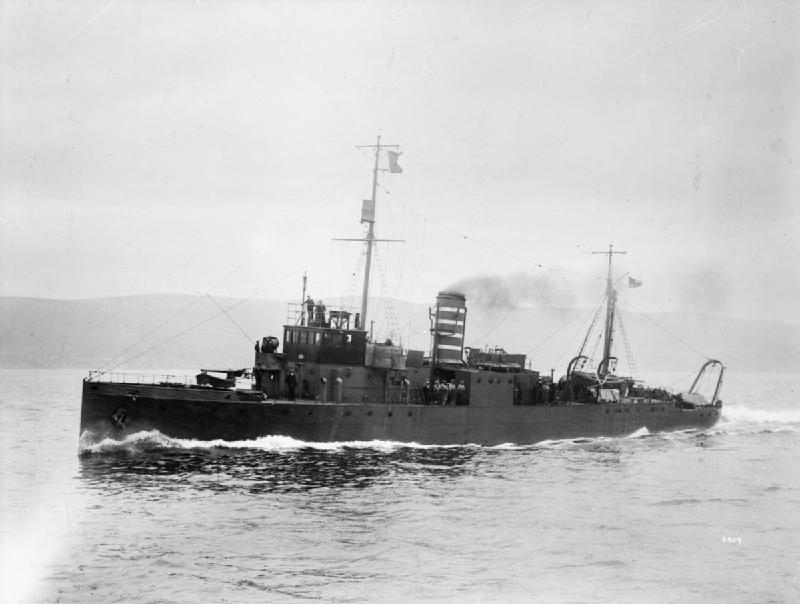
- HMS Belvoir c. 1917–1918

Class overview
- Operators: Royal Navy; Royal Australian Navy; Royal Thai Navy; Spanish Republican Navy; Spanish Navy; Kriegsmarine
- Built: 1916–1919
- In commission: 1917–1952
- Completed: 88
- Lost: 4

General characteristics (1939)
- Type: Minesweeper
- Displacement: 710 long tons (721 t)
- Length: 231 ft (70.4 m)
- Beam: 28 ft (8.5 m) (Belvoir group); 28 ft 6 in (8.7 m) (Aberdare group)
- Draught: 8 ft (2.4 m)
- Installed power: 1,800 ihp (1,340 kW) (Belvoir group) or 2,200 ihp (1,640 kW) (Aberdare group)
- Propulsion: 2 shafts; 2 Vertical triple-expansion steam engines; 2 Yarrow water-tube boilers
- Speed: 16 knots (30 km/h; 18 mph)
- Range: 1,500 nmi (2,780 km; 1,730 mi) at 10 knots (19 km/h; 12 mph)
- Complement: 74
- Armament: 1 × QF 4 in (102 mm) gun forward; 1 × QF 12 pounder aft; 2 × .303 inch machine guns

The Hunt-class minesweeper was a class of minesweeping sloop built between 1916 and 1919 for the Royal Navy. They were built in two discrete groups, the earlier Belvoir group designed by the Ailsa Shipbuilding Company and the subsequent (and slightly larger) Aberdare group designed by the Admiralty. They were classed as Fleet Minesweeping Sloops, that is ships intended to clear open water. The Belvoir group were named after British fox hunts. Those of the Aberdare group were originally named after coastal towns, watering places and fishing ports, some of which happened to be hunts by coincidence. However, all were soon renamed after inland locations to prevent confusion caused by the misunderstanding of signals and orders.

== Design ==
These ships had twin screws and had forced-draught coal burning boilers; that is they burned pulverised coal in an artificially augmented airstream. One consequence of this was that they produced a lot of smoke, so much so that they were more usually referred to as Smokey Joes. Another was that if they were fed anything other than the Welsh Steam Coal they were designed for then the fuel consumption was enormous—one ship was bunkered with soft brown Natal coal and burnt 20 long tons (20 t) in a day. The ships had a shallow draught [8 ft (2.4 m)]. Armament was one QF 4 in (100 mm) gun forward and a QF 12-pounder aft, plus two twin 0.303 inch machine guns. Their counter-mine equipment consisted of Oropesa floats to cut the cables of moored mines.

== Service ==
Six ships were completed as survey vessels, and the majority of the Aberdare group arrived too late to see service during the First World War. Thirty-five were cancelled after the armistice. Interwar, eight were sold out of service, one was sold to Siam, one was converted to an RNVR drillship and 52 were scrapped. The majority of the remainder spent the period from 1919 to 1939 in reserve around the world, with Malta and Singapore having most of them, so that on the outbreak of World War II there were still 27 available for service, to which a further two were added by requisition from mercantile service.

The 5th Minesweeping Flotilla, comprising Pangourne, Ross, Lydd, Kellet and Albury as well as the newer Halcyon-class Gossamer and Leda sailed from North Shields for Harwich late on 26 May 1940, reaching Harwich nearly 24 hours later. After coaling, the flotilla sailed for Dunkirk in the afternoon of 28 May, and was off the beach by about 21:30 hours the same day. At least two ships from the Flotilla (Ross and Lydd) were detailed to collect troops from the harbour mole. Ross alone took on board 353 men and one dog on this first night. The ships of the flotilla made a further three trips to Dunkirk in the following days, working at battle-stations virtually round the clock and returning to Margate for the last time from Dunkirk on Saturday, 1 June 1940. Sutton was also present at Dunkirk.

Five ships were lost during the war, and a further vessel, Widnes was beached in Suda Bay, Crete in May 1941 after being bombed by German aircraft. The Germans recovered and repaired the hull, pressing her into service as 12.V4. In October 1943, now known as Uj.2109, she was sunk by the destroyers HMS Eclipse, HMS Faulknor and the Greek destroyer Vasilissa Olga.

== Ships ==
The first group of twenty ships were ordered in 1916 and were part of the Belvoir group. One hundred and twenty-nine further ships were ordered to this Admiralty design between 1916 and November 1918 as the Aberdare group. Six of this group were completed as survey ships, while thirty-four of them were cancelled at the end of World War I. Among the cancelled ships, Battle and Bloxham had already been launched. Two more were projected to be ordered from Fleming & Ferguson, but these two were never actually ordered.

Many ships were originally assigned different names which were changed while building to avoid use of coastal locations as ship names.

=== Original Royal Navy service ===
RN service
Name	Pennant	Builder	Laid down	Launch	Commission	Disposed	Notes
Belvoir group (20 ships ordered in 1916)
Belvoir		Ailsa Shipbuilding Company, Troon		8 March 1917		July 1922	Sold for scrap
Bichester		Ailsa Shipbuilding Company, Troon		8 June 1917		8 January 1923	Sold for scrap
Blackmorevale		Ardrossan Dry Dock, Ardrossan		23 March 1917		1 May 1918	Sunk by a mine off Montrose, Angus
Cattistock		Clyde Shipbuilding Company, Port Glasgow		21 February 1917		22 February 1923	Sold for scrap
Cotswold		Bow, McLachlan and Company, Paisley		28 November 1916		18 January 1923	
Cottesmore		Bow, McLachlan and Company, Paisley		9 February 1917		18 January 1923	Sold for scrap
Croome		Clyde Shipbuilding Company, Port Glasgow		22 May 1917		July 1922	
Dartmoor		Dunlop Bremner & Company, Port Glasgow		30 March 1917		21 February 1923	Sold for scrap
Garth		Dunlop Bremner & Company, Port Glasgow		9 May 1917		21 February 1923	Sold for scrap
Hambledon		Fleming & Ferguson, Paisley		9 March 1917		July 1922	Sold for scrap
Heythrop		Fleming & Ferguson, Paisley		4 June 1917		July 1922	
Holderness		D. & W. Henderson and Company, Glasgow		9 November 1916		August 1924	Sold for scrap
Meynell		D. & W. Henderson and Company, Glasgow		7 February 1917		4 November 1922	Sold for scrap
Muskerry		Lobnitz and Company, Renfrew		28 November 1916		22 January 1923	Sold for scrap
Oakley		Lobnitz and Company, Renfrew		10 January 1917		18 January 1923	Sold for scrap
Pytchley		Napier and Miller, Old Kilpatrick		24 March 1917		July 1922	Sold for scrap
Quorn		Napier and Miller, Old Kilpatrick		4 June 1917		18 September 1922	Sold for scrap
Southdown		William Simons and Company, Renfrew		7 July 1917		16 December 1926	Sold for scrap
Tedworth		William Simons and Company, Renfrew		20 June 1917		November 1946	Became a diving tender in August 1923; Sold for scrap
Zetland		Murdoch and Murray, Port Glasgow		1917		18 January 1923	Sold for scrap
Aberdare group (129 ships ordered between 1916 and 1918)
Aberdare		Ailsa Shipbuilding Company, Troon	1 January 1917	29 April 1918	3 October 1918	13 March 1947	Sold for mercantile use
Abingdon	J23 / N23	Ailsa Shipbuilding Company, Troon	30 November 1917	11 June 1918	6 November 1918	5 April 1942	Beached after bombing; broken up
Albury	J41	Ailsa Shipbuilding Company, Troon		21 November 1918	17 February 1919	13 March 1947	Sold for mercantile use
Alresford	J06 / N06	Ailsa Shipbuilding Company, Troon		17 January 1919	25 May 1919	13 March 1947	Sold for scrap
Appledore		Ailsa Shipbuilding Company, Troon		15 August 1919		15 August 1920	Sold for civilian use as Kamlawti
Badminton		Ardrossan Dry Dock & Shipbuilding, Ardrossan		18 March 1918		19 May 1928	Sold for scrap
Bagshot	J57 / N57	Ardrossan Dry Dock & Shipbuilding, Ardrossan		23 May 1918	1 May 1919	1 April 1942	Converted to depot ship Medway II; sold 1947
Banchory		Ayrshire Shipbuilding Company, Irvine		15 May 1918		18 May 1922	Sold
Barnstaple		Ardrossan Dry Dock & Shipbuilding, Ardrossan		20 March 1919		1 December 1921	Sold for mercantile use as Lady Cynthia
Battle		Dundee Shipbuilding Company, Dundee		October 1919	Not taken up	March 1922	Sold incomplete
Blackburn (ex-Burnham)		Bow, McLachlan and Company, Paisley		13 August 1918		17 October 1922	Sold
Bloxham (ex-Brixham)		Ayrshire Shipbuilding Company, Irvine		11 September 1919	Not taken up	23 October 1923	Sold incomplete
Bootle (ex-Buckie)		Bow, McLachlan and Company, Paisley		11 June 1918		21 February 1923	Sold for scrap
Bradfield		Ayrshire Shipbuilding Company, Irvine		14 May 1919		October 1920	Sold for use as Champavati
Burslem (ex-Blakeney)		Ayrshire Shipbuilding Company, Irvine		5 March 1918		19 May 1928	Sold
Bury		Joseph R. Eltringham, South Shields		17 May 1919		20 January 1923	Sold
Caerleon		Bow, McLachlan and Company, Paisley		6 December 1918		April 1922	Sold
Camberley		Bow, McLachlan and Company, Paisley		28 December 1918		July 1923	Sold
Carstairs (ex-Cawsand, Dryad)		Bow, McLachlan and Company, Paisley		19 April 1919		26 April 1935	Sold
Caterham		Bow, McLachlan and Company, Paisley		6 March 1919		26 April 1935	Sold
Cheam		Joseph R. Eltringham, South Shields		2 July 1919		18 March 1922	Sold
Clonmel (ex-Stranraer)		William Simons and Company		14 May 1918		July 1922	Sold
Craigie		Clyde Shipbuilding		29 May 1918		18 May 1922	Sold
Cupar (ex-Rosslare)		A. McMillan & Son, Dumbarton		27 March 1918		5 May 1919	Sunk by mine
Derby (ex-Dawlish)	J90 / N90	Clyde Shipbuilding		9 August 1918		4 July 1945	Sold for scrap
Dorking				25 September 1918		26 April 1928	Broken up
Dundalk	J60	Clyde Shipbuilding		31 January 1919		17 October 1940	Foundered under tow after mined
Dunoon	J52	Clyde Shipbuilding		21 March 1919		30 April 1940	Sunk by mine
Elgin	J39	William Simons & Company, Renfrew		3 March 1919		20 March 1945	Sold for scrap
Fairfield		Clyde Shipbuilding		30 May 1919		3 March 1920	Sold for civilian use in Brazil
Fareham	J89 / N89	Dunlop Bremner & Company, Port Glasgow		7 June 1919		24 August 1948	Sold for scrap
Fermoy	J40 / N40	Dundee Shipbuilding Company		3 February 1919	July 1919	30 April 1941	Damaged beyond repair by air attack; broken up
Faversham		Dunlop Bremner & Company, Port Glasgow		19 July 1918		25 November 1927	Sold for scrap
Ford (ex-Fleetwood)		Dunlop Bremner & Company, Port Glasgow		19 October 1918		October 1928	Sold and renamed Forde
Forfar		Dundee Shipbuilding		20 August 1918		March 1922	Sold
Forres (ex-Fowey)		Clyde Shipbuilding		22 November 1918		26 April 1935	Sold
Gaddesden				30 November 1917		4 November 1922	Sold
Gainsborough (ex-Gorleston)		Joseph R. Eltringham, South Shields		12 February 1918		June 1928	Sold
Goole (ex-Bridlington)		Ayrshire Shipbuilding Company, Irvine		12 August 1919	April 1926	27 November 1962	Broken up
Gretna		Joseph R. Eltringham, South Shields		11 April 1918		3 October 1928	Sold for scrap
Harrow		Joseph R. Eltringham, South Shields		July 1918		1947	Sold for scrap
Havant		Joseph R. Eltringham, South Shields		24 March 1919		1922	Sold to Royal Thai Navy as Chao Phraya
Huntley (ex-Helmsdale)		Joseph R. Eltringham, South Shields		January 1919		31 January 1941	Sunk by German aircraft off Mersa Matruh
Instow (ex-Ilfracombe)		Joseph R. Eltringham, South Shields		April 1919		Inter-war	
Irvine		Fairfield Shipbuilding and Engineering Company, Govan		December 1917		Inter-war	
Kendal		Fairfield Shipbuilding and Engineering Company, Govan		February 1918		Inter-war	
Kinross		Fairfield Shipbuilding and Engineering Company, Govan		4 July 1918		18 June 1919	Sunk by mine
Leamington (ex-Aldborough)		Ardrossan Dry Dock, Ardrossan		26 August 1918		19 May 1928	Sold for scrap
Longford (ex-Minehead)		John Harkness and Sons, Middlesbrough		March 1919		Inter-war	
Lydd (ex-Lydney)		Fairfield Shipbuilding and Engineering Company, Govan		December 1918		1947	Sold for scrap
Mallaig		Fleming & Ferguson, Paisley		October 1918		Inter-war	
Malvern		Fleming & Ferguson, Paisley		February 1919		Inter-war	
Marazion		Fleming & Ferguson, Paisley		15 April 1919		March 1933	Sold in Hong Kong
Marlow		Harkness		August 1918		Inter-war	
Mistley (ex-Maryport)		Harkness		October 1918		Inter-war	
Monaghan (ex-Mullion)		Harkness		May 1919		Inter-war	
Munlochy (ex-Macduff)		Fleming & Ferguson, Paisley		June 1918		Inter-war	
Nailsea		A and J Inglis, Pointhouse		August 1918		Inter-war	
Newark (ex-Newlyn)		Inglis		June 1919		Inter-war	
Northolt		Joseph R. Eltringham, South Shields		June 1918		Inter-war	
Pangbourne (ex-Padstow)		Lobnitz and Company, Renfrew		March 1918		1947	Sold for scrap
Penarth		Lobnitz and Company, Renfrew				1919	Lost
Petersfield (ex-Portmadoc)	T8 / T21	Lobnitz and Company, Renfrew		3 March 1919		11 November 1931	Wrecked
Pontypool (ex-Polperro)		Lobnitz and Company, Renfrew		June 1918		Inter-war	
Prestatyn (ex-Porlock)		Lobnitz and Company, Renfrew		November 1918		Inter-war	
Repton (ex-Wicklow)		Inglis		1919		Inter-war	
Ross (ex-Ramsey)	J45	Lobnitz and Company, Renfrew		12 June 1919		13 March 1947	Sold for scrap
Rugby (ex-Filey)		Dunlop Bremner & Company, Port Glasgow		September 1919		25 November 1927	Sold
Salford (ex-Shoreham)		Murdoch and Murray, Port Glasgow		April 1919			
Saltash		Murdoch and Murray, Port Glasgow	5 September 1917	25 June 1918		January 1945	Sold for scrap
Saltburn		Murdoch and Murray, Port Glasgow	29 January 1918	9 October 1918	31 December 1918	16 November 1946	Sold for scrap and wrecked
Selkirk	J18	Murdoch and Murray, Port Glasgow	5 March 1918	2 December 1918	17 March 1919	17 May 1947	Sold for scrap
Sherborne (ex-Tarbert)		William Simons and Company, Renfrew		June 1918		Inter-war	
Shrewsbury		Napier and Miller		February 1918		Inter-war	
Sligo		Napier and Miller		March 1918		Inter-war	
Stafford (ex-Staithes)		Charles Rennoldson, South Shields		February 1918		Inter-war	
Stoke (ex-Southwold)		Charles Rennoldson, South Shields		June 1918		7 May 1941	Sunk by German aircraft off Tobruk
Sutton (ex-Salcombe)		Archibald McMillan and Son, Dumbarton		March 1918		1947	Sold
Swindon		Ardrossan Dry Dock, Ardrossan		25 December 1918		1 December 1921	Sold for civilian use as Lady Cecille
Tiverton		William Simons and Company, Renfrew		September 1918		Inter-war	
Tonbridge		William Simons and Company, Renfrew		November 1918		19 May 1928	Sold
Tralee		William Simons and Company, Renfrew		17 December 1918		2 July 1929	Sold
Tring (ex-Teignmouth)		William Simons and Company, Renfrew		August 1919		Inter-war	
Truro		William Simons and Company, Renfrew		April 1919		19 May 1928	Sold
Wem (ex-Walmer)		William Simons and Company, Renfrew		12 September 1919		22 April 1922	Sold for civilian use as Deshalpur
Wexford		William Simons and Company, Renfrew		10 October 1919	1919	1921	Sold for mercatile use as Doomba
Weybourne		Inglis		February 1919		Inter-war	
Widnes (ex-Withernsea)		Napier and Miller		June 1918		May 1941	Bombed by German aircraft in Suda Bay, beached, captured as Uj.2109
Yeovil		Napier and Miller		August 1918		Inter-war	
Aberdare group completed as survey ships
Beaufort (ex-Ambleside)				1919		Inter-war	
Collinson (ex-Amersham)		Ailsa Shipbuilding Company		1919		Inter-war	
Crozier (ex-Verwood, ex-Ventnor)		William Simons and Company, Renfrew		1 July 1919	1 July 1919	28 November 1921	Transferred to South Africa as HMSAS Protea
Fitzroy (ex-Pinner, ex-Portreath)		Lobnitz and Company, Renfrew		1919		27 May 1942	Sunk by mine off Great Yarmouth
Flinders (ex-Radley)		Lobnitz and Company, Renfrew		1919		1945	Converted to accommodation ship 1940; Sold for scrap
Kellet (ex-Uppingham)				1919		1945	Sold for scrap

=== Follow-on service ===
Several examples passed on from Royal Navy service for use by other civil and military operators.

Name	Previous name	Operator	In service	Disposed	Status	Ref
Champavati	ex-Bradfield		October 1920			
Chao Phraya	ex-Havant	Royal Thai Navy	1922			
Deshalpur	ex-Wem	The Cutch SN Company	22 April 1922	1927	Scrapped	
Doomba	ex-Wexford	Royal Australian Navy	25 September 1939	13 March 1946	Converted to an oil lighter; scuttled	
Doomba	ex-Wexford	Doomba Shipping Company	1921	4 September 1939	Requisitioned by the Royal Australian Navy	
Forde	ex-Ford	Townsend Brothers	8 December 1928	1 May 1954	Scrapped	
Kamlawti	ex-Appledore	Civilian	15 August 1920			
Lady Cecile	ex-Swindon	Union Steamship Company, British Columbia	1 December 1921	1951	Scrapped	
Lady Cynthia	ex-Barnstaple	Merchant	1 December 1921			
Lieutenant Captain Remigio Verdia	ex-Queen of the Bay	Spanish Republican Navy	1938	1939	Grounded, captured by Spanish Nationalist forces as	
Medway II	ex-Bagshot	Depot ship	1 April 1942	1947	Sold	
Protea	ex-Crozier	Royal Navy	30 April 1933	1935	Sold for merchant service as Queen of the Bay	
Protea	ex-Crozier	South African Naval Service	1 April 1922	30 April 1933	Returned to Royal Navy as HMS Protea	
Queen of the Bay	ex-Protea	Blackpool Steam Navigation Company	1935	1938	Sold to Spanish Republican Navy as Lieutenant Captain Remigio Verdia	
Uj.2109	ex-Widnes	Kriegsmarine	May 1941	17 October 1943	Sunk by destroyers	
Virgen de la Caridad	ex-Lieutenant Captain Remigio Verdia	Spanish Nationalist forces	1945	1960		
