= Henry Trevor Lenton =

British naval historian (1924–2009)

- Born: 8 February 1924; Rangoon, Burma, British India
- Died: 7 May 2009 (aged 85)
- Resting place: Mortlake Cemetery
- Occupation: Naval historian
- Spouse: Daphne
- Writing career
- Genre: Naval History
- Notable works: British and Empire Warships of the Second World War

Henry Trevor Lenton (8 February 1924 – 7 May 2009) was an English naval historian, specialising in the area of 20th-century naval history and warship design. He served in the Merchant Navy and the Royal Navy during World War II before becoming a journalist and author.

== Life ==
Born in Rangoon, Burma in 1924, Lenton and his family returned to Britain in 1930. He joined the Merchant Navy at age 15 in 1939 and transferred to the Royal Navy Reserve in 1941 as a midshipman. Lenton was promoted to sub-lieutenant by the end of that year and he was a lieutenant aboard the light cruiser HMS Mauritius in 1944. That same year he volunteered for service in the Royal Indian Navy and was commanding the auxiliary patrol vessel Oostkapelle in 1945. He was a lieutenant commander when World War II ended and was discharged in 1947.

He returned to the Merchant Navy and eventually was rated as Master. Lenton joined the journal Shipbuilding and Shipping Record in 1960 and began writing books and articles. He launched Naval Record Magazine in 1963 which became the leading publication on current naval production at that time. Lenton published his famous "Construction Tables" which were widely sought after each month. The Duke of Edinburgh was a subscriber to the magazine. His life's work led to his magnum opus British and Empire Warships of the Second World War (1998), published by Greenhill Books, which followed on from a series of books on the American, German and Royal Navies of World War II.
