= List of ship names of the Royal Navy (D–F) =

This is a list of Royal Navy ship names starting with D, E, and F.

== D ==
- D1
- D2
- D3
- D4
- D5
- D6
- D7
- D8
- D9
- D10
- Dacres
- Daedalus
- Daedalus II
- Daffodil
- Dagger
- Dahlia
- Dainty
- Daisy
- Dakins
- Dalhousie
- Dalrymple
- Dalswinton
- Dame de Grace
- Damerham
- Dampier
- Danae
- Daneman
- Dangereuse
- Daniel
- Dannemark
- Danube
- Danube III
- Daphne
- Dapper
- Daring
- Darlaston
- Darsham
- Dart
- Dartington
- Dartmoor
- Dartmouth
- Dasher
- Date Tree
- Dauntless
- Dauphin Royal
- Davenham
- David
- Dawlish
- De Ruyter
- Deal Castle
- Deale Castle
- Deale
- Deane
- Decade
- Decibel
- Decouverte
- Decoy
- Dedaigneuse
- Dee
- Deepwater
- Defence
- Defender
- Defiance
- Defiance II
- Defiance III
- Defiance IV
- Dego
- Delaware
- Delft
- Delhi
- Delight
- Deliverance
- Delphinen
- Delphinium
- Delta
- Demerara
- Demir Hisar
- Demon
- Denbigh Castle
- Dennis
- Dependence
- Deptford
- Deptford Prize
- Deptford Transport
- Derby
- Derby Haven
- Derbyshire
- Derg
- Derrington
- Dervish
- Derwent
- Desford
- Desire
- Desiree
- Despatch
- Desperante
- Desperate
- Destiny
- Destruction
- Determinee
- Detroit
- Deux Amis
- Deux Freres
- Devanha
- Devastation
- Deveron
- Devizes Castle
- Devonia
- Devonshire
- Dexterous
- Dextrous
- Dhyfe Castle
- Diable à Quatre
- Diadem
- Diamond
- Diana
- Diane
- Dianella
- Dianthus
- Dictator
- Dido
- Didon
- Dieppe
- Digby
- Diligence
- Diligent
- Diligente
- Dilston
- Dingley
- Diomede
- Dipper
- Director
- Dirk
- Discoverer
- Discovery
- Discovery II
- Disdain
- Dispatch
- Dittany
- Dittisham
- Diver
- Dixmunde
- Dodman Point
- Dodo
- Dogstar
- Dolphin
- Dolphins Prize
- Dolwen
- Domett
- Dominica
- Dominion
- Don
- Doncaster
- Donegal
- Donovan
- Doon
- Dordrecht
- Doris
- Dorking
- Dornoch
- Dorothea
- Dorset
- Dorsetshire
- Doterel
- Dotter
- Douglas
- Dove
- Dover
- Dover Castle
- Dover Prize
- Dovey
- Dowgate
- Downham
- Downley
- Dragon
- Dragon Prize
- Dragonfly
- Drake
- Dreadful
- Dreadnought
- Dreadnought Prize
- Driver
- Drochterland
- Dromedary
- Dromio
- Droxford
- Drudge
- Druid
- Drury
- Dryad
- Dubford
- Dublin
- Dublin Castle
- Duc d'Aquitaine
- Duc de Chartres
- Duc de la Vauginon
- Duc d'Estissac
- Duchess
- Duchess of Cornwall
- Duchess of Cumberland
- Duchess of Devonshire
- Duchess of Fife
- Duchess of Montrose
- Duchess of Norfolk
- Duchess of Richmond
- Duchess of Rothesay
- Duchess of York
- Duckworth
- Duddon
- Dudley Castle
- Due Repulse
- Duff
- Dufferin
- Dufton
- Duguay-Trouin
- Duke
- Duke II
- Duke of Albany
- Duke of Argyll
- Duke of Clarence
- Duke of Cornwall
- Duke of Edinburgh
- Duke of Kent
- Duke of Lancaster
- Duke of Rothesay
- Duke of Wellington
- Duke of York
- Duke William
- Dullisk Cove
- Dulverton
- Dumbarton
- Dumbarton Castle
- Dumbleton
- Dunbar
- Duncan
- Duncansby Head
- Dundalk
- Dundas
- Dundee
- Dundrum Bay
- Dunedin
- Dunera
- Dungeness
- Dunira
- Dunkerton
- Dunkirk
- Dunkirk Prize
- Dunluce Castle
- Dunmore
- Dunnottar Castle
- Dunoon
- Dunster Castle
- Dunvegan Castle
- Dunwich
- Duplex
- Duquesne
- Durban
- Durham
- Dursley Galley
- Durweston
- Dusky Queen
- Duthies
- Dwarf

== E ==
- E1
- E2
- E3
- E4
- E5
- E6
- E7
- E8
- E9
- E10
- E11
- E12
- E13
- E14
- E15
- E16
- E17
- E18
- E19
- E20
- E21
- E22
- E23
- E24
- E25
- E26
- E27
- E28
- E29
- E30
- E31
- E32
- E33
- E34
- E35
- E36
- E37
- E38
- E39
- E40
- E41
- E42
- E43
- E44
- E45
- E46
- E47
- E48
- E49
- E50
- E51
- E52
- E53
- E54
- E55
- E56
- E57
- E58
- Eagle
- Eagle Shallop
- Eaglet
- Earl
- Earl of Chatham
- Earl of Denbigh
- Earl of Egmont
- Earl of Halifax
- Earl of Inchquin
- Earl of Loudon
- Earl of Northampton
- Earl of Peterborough
- Earl Roberts
- Earnest
- Eastbourne
- Easton
- Eastway
- Ebani
- Echo
- Eclair
- Eclipse
- Edderton
- Eden
- Edgar
- Edgeley
- Edinburgh
- Edlingham
- Edward
- Edward and Eve
- Effingham
- Egeria
- Eggesford
- Eglantine
- Eglinton
- Egmont
- Egremont
- Egremont Castle
- Egret
- Egyptienne
- Eideren
- Ekins
- El Corso
- El Nil
- El Vivo
- Eleanor
- Electra
- Elephant
- Elf
- Elfin
- Elfreda
- Elgin
- Elias
- Eling
- Elizabeth
- Elizabeth & Sarah
- Elizabeth Bonaventure
- Elizabeth Jonas
- Elk
- Ellinor
- Ellinore
- Elphinstone
- Elsenham
- Eltham
- Elven
- Embleton
- Emerald
- Emersham
- Emilia
- Emilien
- Emily
- Emperor
- Emperor of India
- Emperor of India II
- Empire
- Empire Anvil
- Empire Arquebus
- Empire Audacity
- Empire Battleaxe
- Empire Broadsword
- Empire Cedric
- Empire Celtic
- Empire Comfort
- Empire Crossbow
- Empire Cutlass
- Empire Cymric
- Empire Dace
- Empire Gauntlet
- Empire Halberd
- Empire Javelin
- Empire Lance
- Empire Mace
- Empire Peacemaker
- Empire Rapier
- Empire Rest
- Empire Shelter
- Empire Spearhead
- Empress
- Empress Mary
- Empress of Asia
- Empress of Britain
- Empress of France
- Empress of India
- Empress of Japan
- Empress of Russia
- Empress Queen
- Ems
- Emsworth
- Emulous
- Enard Bay
- Enchantress
- Encounter
- Endeavour
- Endeavour Bark
- Endeavour Transport
- Endurance
- Endymion
- Engadine
- Engageante
- England
- Englishman
- Enterprise
- Enterprize
- Entreprenante
- Epervier
- Ephira
- Ephraim
- Epinal
- Epreuve
- Epsom
- Erebus
- Erica
- Eridanus
- Eridge
- Erin
- Erne
- Errant
- Eruption
- Escapade
- Escort
- Esk
- Eskdale
- Eskimo
- Esperance
- Esperance Bay
- Esperanza
- Espiegle
- Espion
- Espoir
- Essequibo
- Essex
- Essex Prize
- Essex Queen
- Essington
- Esther
- Estridge
- Etchingham
- Ethalion
- Etna
- Etrusco
- Ettrick
- Eugenie
- Euphrates
- Euphrosyne
- Europa
- Eurotas
- Eurus
- Euryalus
- Eurydice
- Eustatia
- Evadne
- Evenlode
- Everingham
- Example
- Excalibur
- Excellent
- Exchange
- Exe
- Exertion
- Exerton
- Exeter
- Exmoor
- Exmouth
- Expedition
- Experiment
- Exploit
- Explorer
- Explosion
- Express
- Extravagant
- Eyderen
- Eyebright

== F ==
- F1
- F2
- F3
- Fagons
- Fair Rhodian
- Fair Rosamond
- Fairfax
- Fairfield
- Fairlight
- Fairplay II
- Fairy
- Fairy Queen
- Faislane
- Faith
- Faithful
- Fal
- Falcon
- Falcon Flyboat
- Falcon in the Fetterlock
- Falcon of the Tower
- Falkland
- Falkland Prize
- Falmouth
- Fama
- Fame
- Fancy
- Fandango
- Fanfan
- Fanny
- Fantome
- Fara Numa
- Fareham
- Farndale
- Farnham Castle
- Farragut
- Fastnet
- Faulknor
- Faversham
- Favorite
- Favourite
- Fawkner
- Fawn
- Fearless
- Felicidade
- Felicite
- Felicity
- Felix
- Felixstowe
- Fellowship
- Felmersham
- Fencer
- Fenella
- Fennel
- Fenton
- Fermoy
- Fernie
- Feroze
- Ferret
- Ferreter
- Fertile Vale
- Fervent
- Feversham
- Fidelity
- Fidget
- Fierce
- Fife
- Fife Ness
- Fifi
- Fighter
- Fiji
- Filey
- Finch
- Findhorn
- Finisterre
- Finwhale
- Fiona
- Fireball
- Firebrand
- Firedrake
- Firefly
- Firequeen
- Firm
- Firme
- Fisgard
- Fisgard II
- Fisgard III
- Fisgard IV
- Fisher Boy
- Fisher Girl
- Fishguard
- Fiskerton
- Fittleton
- Fitzroy
- Flambeau
- Flamborough
- Flamborough Head
- Flamborough Prize
- Flame
- Flamer
- Flamingo
- Flash
- Flax
- Fleche
- Fleetwood
- Fleur de la Mer
- Fleur de Lys
- Flewende Fische
- Flight
- Flinders
- Flint
- Flint Castle
- Flintham
- Flirt
- Flockton
- Flora
- Florentina
- Florida
- Floriston
- Florizel
- Flotta
- Flower de Luce
- Fly
- Flying Fish
- Flying Fox
- Flying Greyhound
- Foam
- Foley
- Folkeston
- Folkestone
- Force
- Ford
- Forerunner
- Fordham
- Foresight
- Forester
- Forfar
- Formidable
- Forres
- Fort Dee
- Fort Diamond
- Fort Royal
- Fort York
- Forte
- Forth
- Fortitude
- Fortituud
- Fortune
- Fortune Prize
- Fortunée
- Forward
- Fotheringay Castle
- Foudre
- Foudroyant
- Fougueux
- Fountain
- Fowey
- Fox
- Foxglove
- Foxhound
- Foyle
- Foylebank
- Franchise
- Francis
- Franklin
- Fraserburgh
- Fratton
- Frederick
- Frederick William
- Frederickstein
- Frederickswaern
- Freesia
- French Ruby
- French Victory
- Frere
- Frettenham
- Freya
- Friendship
- Friezland
- Fritham
- Fritillary
- Frobisher
- Frog
- Frolic
- Frome
- Fubbs
- Fuerte
- Fuh Wo
- Fulmar
- Fulminate
- Furieuse
- Furious
- Furnace
- Fury
- Fuze
- Fyen
- Fylla

== See also ==
- List of aircraft carriers of the Royal Navy
- List of amphibious warfare ships of the Royal Navy
- List of pre-dreadnought battleships of the Royal Navy
- List of dreadnought battleships of the Royal Navy
- List of battlecruisers of the Royal Navy
- List of cruiser classes of the Royal Navy
- List of destroyer classes of the Royal Navy
- List of patrol vessels of the Royal Navy
- List of frigate classes of the Royal Navy
- List of monitors of the Royal Navy
- List of mine countermeasure vessels of the Royal Navy (includes minesweepers and mine hunters)
- List of Royal Fleet Auxiliary ship names
- List of submarines of the Royal Navy
- List of survey vessels of the Royal Navy
- List of Royal Navy shore establishments
