= Eastbourne (disambiguation) =

Eastbourne is a town in East Sussex, United Kingdom. It may also refer to:

- Eastbourne, County Durham, England
- Eastbourne, East Sussex, England
  - Eastbourne (UK Parliament constituency)
- Eastbourne, New Zealand
- HMS Eastbourne, the name of two ships of the Royal Navy
