= Dainty =

Dainty may refer to:

- 9758 Dainty, asteroid
- HMS Dainty, four ships of the Royal Navy
- Dainty, a street ball game played in Schnitzelburg, Louisville

== People with the surname ==
- Bert Dainty (1879–1957), an English footballer and manager
- Billy Dainty (1927–1986), a British comedian
- Christopher Dainty, American physicist
- Harold Dainty (1892–1961), an English cricketer
