= Flamborough (disambiguation) =

Flamborough may refer to:

- Flamborough, East Riding, Yorkshire, England, UK
- Flamborough, Ontario, Canada
- HMS Flamborough, a British Royal Navy ship name
- Empire Flamborough, the Empire ship Flamborough
- Ancaster—Dundas—Flamborough—Westdale, a Canadian federal electoral district in Ontario
- Flamborough—Glanbrook, a planned Canadian federal electoral district in Ontario
- Ancaster—Dundas—Flamborough—Aldershot, a former Canadian federal electoral district in Ontario
- Ancaster—Dundas—Flamborough—Westdale (provincial electoral district), a Canadian provincial electoral district of Ontario
- Ancaster—Dundas—Flamborough—Aldershot (provincial electoral district), a former Canadian provincial electoral district of Ontario
- Flamborough railway station, a former rail station in Marton, Yorkshire, England, UK

== See also ==
- Flamborough Head (disambiguation)
- HMS Flamborough Prize (1757), the former General Lally
