= Essington (disambiguation) =

Essington is a village and civil parish in South Staffordshire, England.

Essington may also refer to:

Films

- Essington (film), a film directed by Julian Pringle

People

- John Essington (disambiguation)
- Thurlow Essington (1886–1964), American lawyer and politician
- William Essington (c. 1753 – 1816), Royal Navy admiral
- Essington Lewis (1881–1961), Australian industrialist

Places

- Essington, Pennsylvania, a community in the United States
- Port Essington, a former settlement in the Northern Territory in Australia
- Port Essington, British Columbia, a town in Canada
- Essington Hall, a former plantation in Maryland, United States
- Essington, Westmead, a former homestead in a suburb of Sydney, New South Wales, Australia

Ships

- HMS Essington, more than one British ship of the Royal Navy

Sports

- Essington Rugby Union Football Club, an English rugby union team
- A tongue-in-cheek nickname for the Essendon Football Club, a team in the Australian Football League.
