= French ship Dauphin Royal =

Five ships of the French Navy have borne the name Dauphin Royal in honour of the Dauphin of France:

== Ships named Dauphin Royal ==
- Dauphin Royal (1664), a 12-gun fluyt better known as Éléphant
- Dauphin Royal (1668), a 110-gun ship of the line that fought at Beachy Head
- Dauphin Royal (1738), a 74-gun ship of the line that fought at Quiberon Bay and Ushant
- Dauphin Royal (1791), a 118-gun ship of the line (launched 1791 at Toulon), renamed Sans Culotte in September 1792 and then Orient in May 1795 - flagship of the French fleet at the Battle of the Nile
- Fleurus (1853), a 90-gun Hercule-class ship of the line, was originally Brianée and then Dauphin Royal before being renamed in 1830 during construction; she was not launched until 1853
Ships of the French Navy named Dauphin Royal
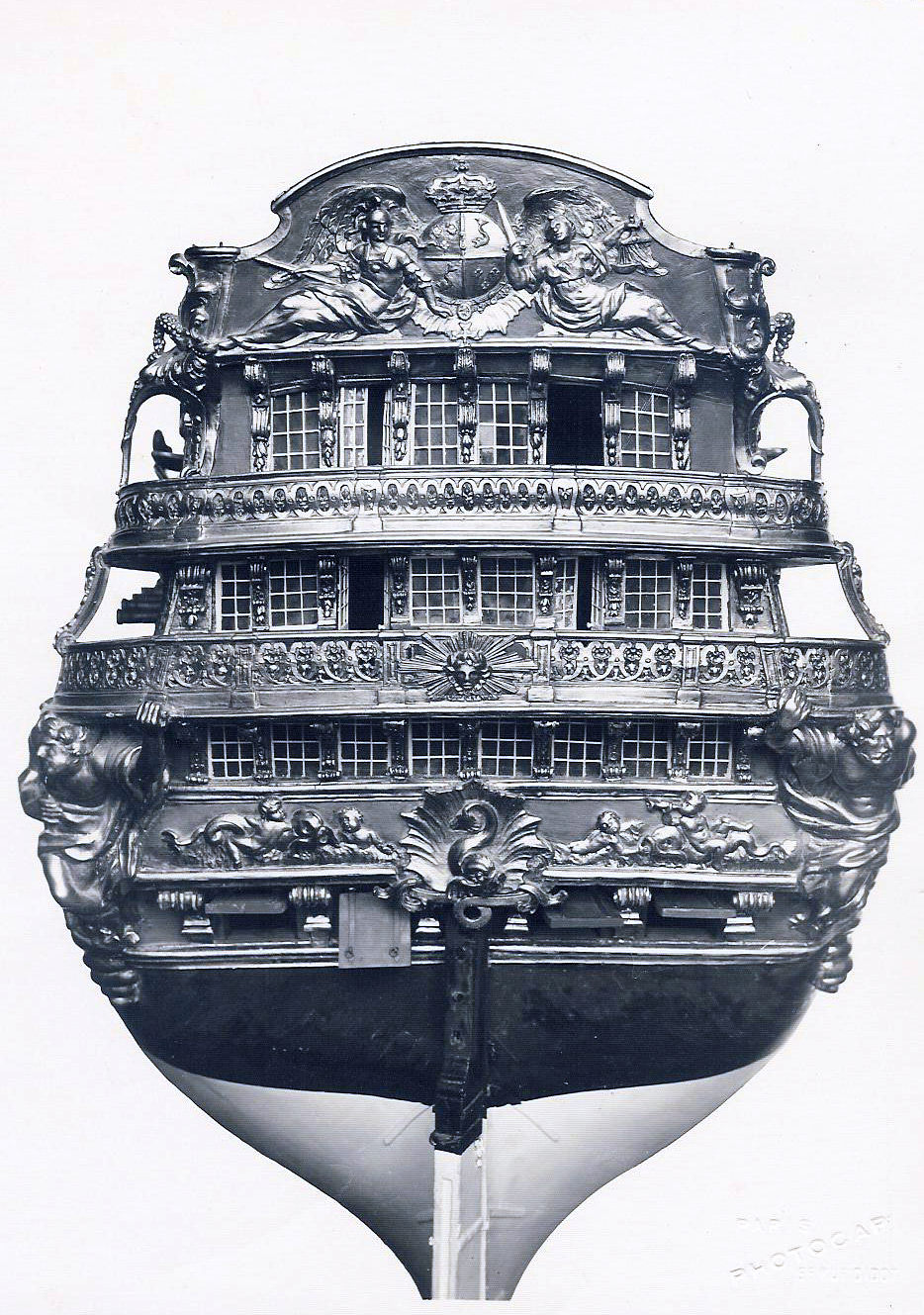
Aft of Dauphin Royal (1668)

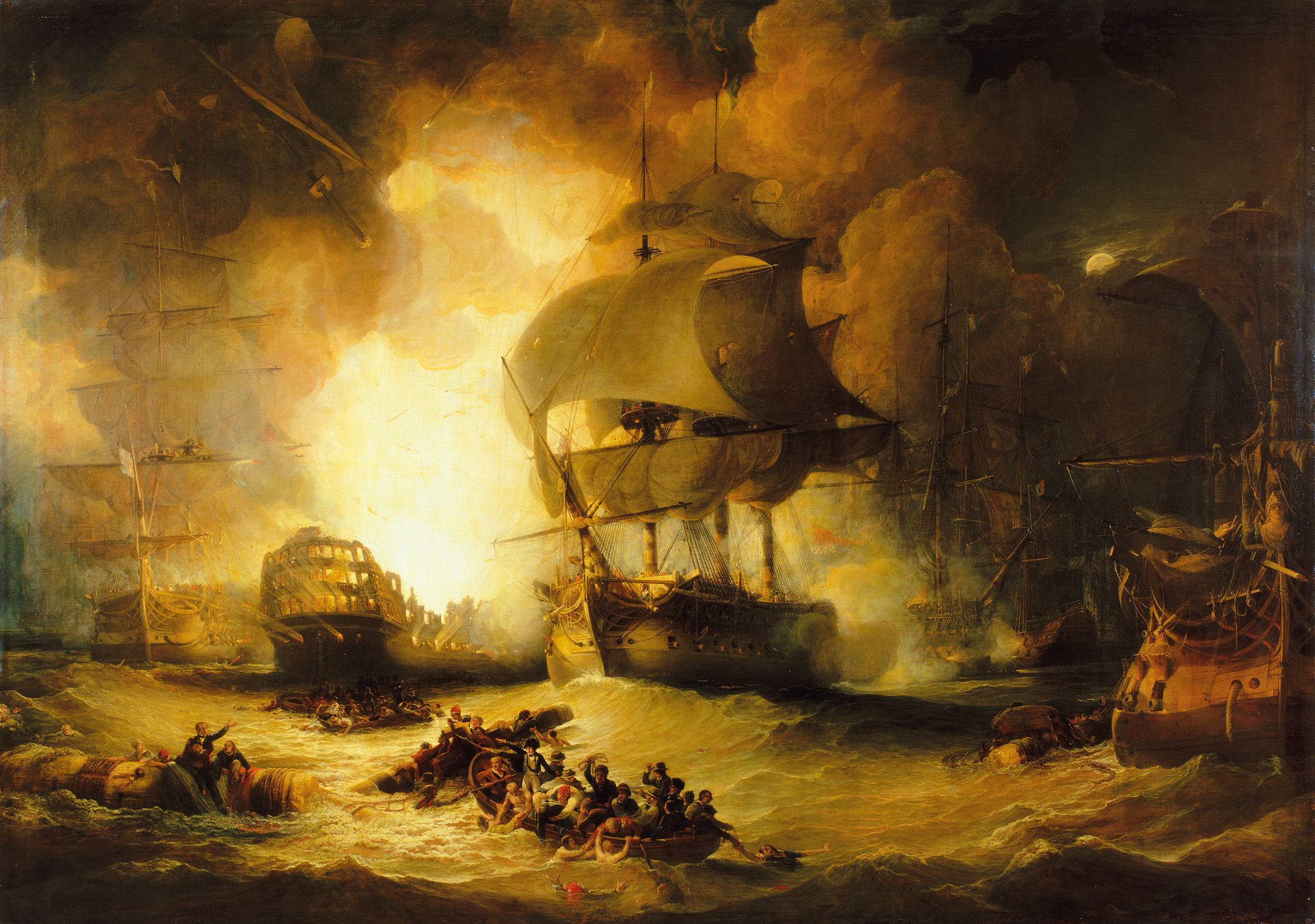
Orient, ex-Dauphin Royal (1791), exploding during the Battle of the Nile

== See also ==
- HMS Dauphin Royal (1796)

== Notes and references ==
=== Bibliography ===
- Roche, Jean-Michel (2005). Dictionnaire des bâtiments de la flotte de guerre française de Colbert à nos jours. Vol. 1. Group Retozel-Maury Millau. pp. 142–143. ISBN 978-2-9525917-0-6. OCLC 165892922.
