= Deptford (disambiguation) =

Deptford is an area in the London Borough of Lewisham and London Borough of Greenwich.

Deptford also may refer to:

== Geography ==
- Relating to the area of London
  - Deptford (electoral division) (1973–1986)
  - Deptford (London County Council constituency) (1889–1965)
  - Deptford (UK Parliament constituency) (1885–1974)
  - Deptford (ward)
  - Lewisham Deptford (UK Parliament constituency) (1974–2024)
  - Deptford St Nicholas, former parish
  - Deptford St Paul, former parish
  - Metropolitan Borough of Deptford (1900–1965)
  - Deptford railway station
  - Deptford Bridge DLR station
  - Deptford Dockyard, former naval dockyard
  - Deptford Wharf
  - Deptford Market
  - Deptford Green School
  - Deptford Park
- Elsewhere in the United Kingdom
  - Deptford, Sunderland, a location
  - Deptford, Wiltshire, a hamlet
- New Jersey, United States
  - Deptford Township
  - West Deptford Township
  - Deptford Township High School
  - West Deptford High School
  - Deptford Mall
- Deptford, Victoria, Australia

== People ==
- Sir Richard Browne, 1st Baronet, of Deptford

== Media ==
- "The Adventure of the Deptford Horror", by Adrian Conan Doyle
- A Dead Man in Deptford, by Anthony Burgess
- The Deptford Mice cycle, by Robin Jarvis
- Deptford Fun City Records, defunct record sub-label
- The Deptford Trilogy, novels by Robertson Davies set in the fictional village of Deptford, Ontario

== Other uses ==
- HMS Deptford, nine ships of the Royal Navy
- Deptford (1781 EIC ship)
- Deptford culture, Native American archaeological culture (2500–100 BCE) of southeast United States
- Deptford Pink, flowering plant Dianthus armeria
- Battle of Deptford Bridge, 1497

== See also ==
- Deptford Bridge (disambiguation)
