= Ettrick =

Ettrick may refer to:

== Places ==
=== Australia ===
- Ettrick, New South Wales, administered by Kyogle Council
- Ettrick, South Australia, a locality in the Rural City of Murray Bridge
- Ettrick Station, pastoral lease and former sheep station in northwest Western Australia
- Ettrick (homestead), a property in western Victoria

=== Canada ===
- Ettrick, Ontario, Canada, a community in Middlesex Centre

=== New Zealand ===
- Ettrick, New Zealand, in Otago

=== Scotland ===
- Ettrick, Scotland, in the Scottish Borders
  - Ettrick Water, a river in Ettrick
- Ettrick Bay, a coastal bay on the west coast of the Isle of Bute
- Ettrick Forest, a Royal forest that covered broad swathes of the Scottish Borders
- Ettrick, Roxburgh and Berwickshire (Scottish Parliament constituency)
- Ettrick and Lauderdale, a local government districts in the Borders region from 1975 to 1996
- Loch Ettrick, a body of water in the Southern Uplands

=== United States ===
- Ettrick, Virginia
- Ettrick (town), Wisconsin
  - Ettrick (village), Wisconsin, the village in the town of Ettrick

== Ships ==
- HMS Ettrick, four different ships of the Royal Navy
- SS Ettrick, a British ship that was part of Operation Aerial in June 1940, sunk in August 1942

== Aircraft ==
- Ettrick, an Armstrong Whitworth Ensign aircraft

== Other ==
- Ettrick (homestead), a historic homestead in Victoria, Australia
- Baron Ettrick, a title in the Peerage of the United Kingdom

== See also ==
- Ettrich, a surname
