= HMSAS Protea =

HMSAS Protea can refer to:

- HMSAS Protea (1922) - hydrographic ship of the South African Naval service, formerly the Hunt-class minesweeper HMS Crozier , later returning to British service as HMS Protea in 1933 before sale in 1935
- HMSAS Protea - formerly the whaler Terje VII hired and renamed in 1941 for anti-submarine operations in World War II. Returned to her original owners in 1946
- HMSAS Protea (1947) -a hydrographic ship, formerly the World War II Flower-class corvette HMS Rockrose (K51), acquired in 1947

== See also ==
- SAS Protea
