= List of ships named Duchess of York =

A number of ships have been named Duchess of York, after the title or title holder of the Duchess of York, including:

== Sailing ships ==
- Duchess of York was a lugger of 12 tons (bm), two 1-pounder guns and six swivel guns, and 20 men, whose captain, Nicholas Du Frocq, received a letter of marque on 10 June 1793.
- Duchess of York was built as Asia (1798 ship) in Philadelphia. New owners in 1805 renamed her Duchess of York. Under that name she traded with the West Indies and South America until she wrecked in 1826.
- Duchess of York (1807 ship) was a Spanish prize that started on a voyage as a slave ship. She was cut off on the coast of Africa in 1807 on her first slave trading voyage.

== Steamships ==
- SS Duchess of York (1895), a South Eastern Railway passenger ferry
- SS Duchess of York (1928), a Canadian Pacific Railway ocean liner

== See also ==
- HMS Duchess of York
