= HMS Diligent =

A number of ships of the Royal Navy have borne the name HMS Diligent (or Diligente).

- HMS Diligent (1770) was an 8-gun schooner purchased in March 1770 that the Americans captured in 1775.
- HMS Diligent (1776) was the mercantile schooner Byfield purchased in 1776 and wrecked in the Bay of Fundy in May 1777.
- HMS Diligent (1777) was a 10-gun sloop purchased in North America in 1777. The Americans captured her in 1779, scuttling her at the end of the disastrous Penobscot Expedition.
- HMS Diligente was a Spanish third rate of 68 guns, launched in 1763 that the Royal Navy captured at the battle of Cape St Vincent (1780); she was sold in 1794 for breaking up.
- HMS Diligent (1781) was a schooner of eight guns that served between 1781 and 1790.
- HMS Diligent (1790) was a schooner of four guns purchased locally in 1790 for the Halifax station, decommissioned in 1795, and converted to harbour duties.
- HMS Diligent was the storeship HMS Porpoise, renamed HMS Diligent in 1799 and sold in 1802.
- HMS Diligente was a French corvette of 12 guns that HMS Crescent captured in the Antilles in 1800. The Royal Navy took her into service as a 14-gun transport and sold her in 1814.
- HMS Diligent (1806) was a French brig-sloop of 16 guns that HMS Renard captured in the West Indies in 1806. The Navy renamed her Prudente in 1806, and Wolf in 1807. She was broken up in 1811.
- HMS Diligent (1813) was the French lugger Diligente that HMS Cephalus captured in 1813. The Royal Navy sold her in December 1814.
- HMS Diligent was a tug mentioned in 1903.
- HMS Diligente was a French patrol boat launched at Brest in 1916 that served the Royal Navy during World War II as a depot ship for auxiliary patrol craft.

== See also ==
- HMS Diligence
- HM hired armed cutter Diligent
