= Fisgard =

Fisgard is an English name derived from Fishguard, a coastal town in Pembrokeshire, southwest Wales.

Fisgard may also refer to:

- Fisgard Lighthouse, an historic lighthouse near Victoria, British Columbia, Canada and named after HMS Fisgard (1819)
- Fisgard Street, a historic street in Chinatown, Victoria, British Columbia, Canada
- HMS Fisgard, any of several ships of the British Royal Navy
