= E26 =

E26 or E-26 may refer to:

- The chassis designation for the Nissan Caravan van from 2012 to present
- BMW E26
- European route E26
- E26 screw, a type of Edison light bulb socket screw
- HMS E26, a British submarine
- Nimzo-Indian Defense, Sämisch variation, Encyclopedia of Chess Openings code
- Kinki Expressway and Hanwa Expressway (between Matsubara JCT and Wakayama JCT), route E26 in Japan
- South Klang Valley Expressway, route E26 in Malaysia
