= Flamborough Head (disambiguation) =

Flamborough Head may refer to:

- Flamborough Head, a promontory in Yorkshire, England, UK
- RAF Flamborough Head, a British Royal Air Force base
- HMS Flamborough Head, a British Royal Navy ship
- Battle of Flamborough Head, a naval battle
- Flamborough Head Lighthouse

== See also ==
- Flamborough (disambiguation)
- HMS Flamborough Prize
- Empire Flamborough
