= Ettrich =

Ettrich is a surname. Notable people with the surname include:

- Antonín Ettrich (fl. 1920s), Czechoslovak cross country skier
- Matthias Ettrich (born 1972), German computer scientist

== See also ==
- Ettrick (disambiguation)
