= HMS Dove =

Nine ships of the Royal Navy have been named HMS Dove after the bird family Columbidae:

- Dove (1672 dogger) was an 8-gun dogger captured from the Dutch in 1672 and wrecked in 1674.
- Dove (1672 ketch) was a 4-gun ketch built at Deptford in 1672 and sold in 1683.
- HMS Dove (1805) was a 4-gun schooner purchased in May 1805 and captured by the French in August the same year.
- HMS Ariadne (1805) was the mercantile Ariadne, launched at Cowes in 1803, and purchased in 1805 as an advice boat. She was renamed HMS Dove, and then renamed HMS Flight in 1806 but foundered in September 1806.
- HMS Dove (1823) was a 6-gun packet brig purchased in 1823 and sold in 1829.
- HMS Kangaroo (1852), a 12-gun Acorn-class brig-sloop, was ordered as HMS Dove in 1839, renamed Kangaroo in 1843, and eventually launched in 1852. She was sold in 1897.
- HMS Dove (1855) was an Albacore-class wooden screw gunboat launched in 1855 and sold at Shanghai in 1873.
- HMS Dove (1893) was a 20-ton paddle gunboat built in sections at Yarrows in Poplar, London in 1893 and assembled in East Africa. She was transferred to the government of British Central Africa in 1895.
- HMS Dove (1898) was a three-funnel, 30-knot destroyer (later classified as a C-class destroyer) launched in 1898 and sold in 1920.

== See also ==
- The Royalist ketch English ship Fortune (1644) was captured by the Parliamentarians in 1644, renamed Dove and lost in 1650.
- HMS Ringdove, the name of seven Royal Navy vessels.
