= Dickenson (1770 ship) =

History

Thirteen Colonies
- Name: Dickenson
- Launched: 1770, Philadelphia
- Renamed: Saint Joseph (1776)
- Fate: Last listed in 1779

General characteristics
- Tons burthen: 180 (bm)

Dickenson (or Dickinson), was launched at Philadelphia in 1770. Missing volumes online and missing pages in extant volumes means she first appeared in Lloyd's Register (LR) in 1776.

Year	Master	Owner	Trade	Source & notes
1776	Js.Johnson; W.Meston	W.Halliday	Philadelphia–Bristol	LR; Now the Joseph Y.Barra

The Lieutenant commanding the British tender Earl of Inchiquin seized the snow Dickinson (or Dickenson), William Meston, master, on 7 April 1776 at King Road, off Avonmouth in the Bristol Channel. Dickinson had been on her way to Nantes when Dickinson's crew brought her into Bristol. She carried documents describing all the vessels the American rebels were sending to France.

In 1776 a new owner purchased Dickenson and renamed her Saint Joseph.

On 25 September 1776 St Joseph, Y.Barra, master, arrived at Bristol from Bilbao. On 5 December she sailed for St. Andero.

Year	Vessel	Master	Owner	Trade	Source
1779	Saint Joseph	Ig y Barra	Captain	Bristol–Bilbao	LR

St Joseph was last listed in 1779.
