= HMS Elk =

Four ships of the Royal Navy have borne the name HMS Elk, another name for the European moose:

- HMS Elk (1804) was an 18-gun Cruizer-class brig-sloop launched in 1804 and broken up in 1812.
- HMS Elk (1813) was an 18-gun Cruizer-class brig-sloop launched in 1813 and sold in 1836.
- HMS Elk (1847) was a 16-gun brig-sloop launched in 1847. She was renamed WV 13 when she was transferred to the Coastguard in 1863, being renamed WV 28 later that year. She was sold in 1893.
- HMS Elk (1868) was a composite screw sloop launched in 1868, used as a tug from 1890 and sold in 1905 for use as a dredger.

== See also ==
- HMCS Elk
- HMT Elk
