= HMSAS Protea (1922) =

1922 Survey ship of the South African Navy

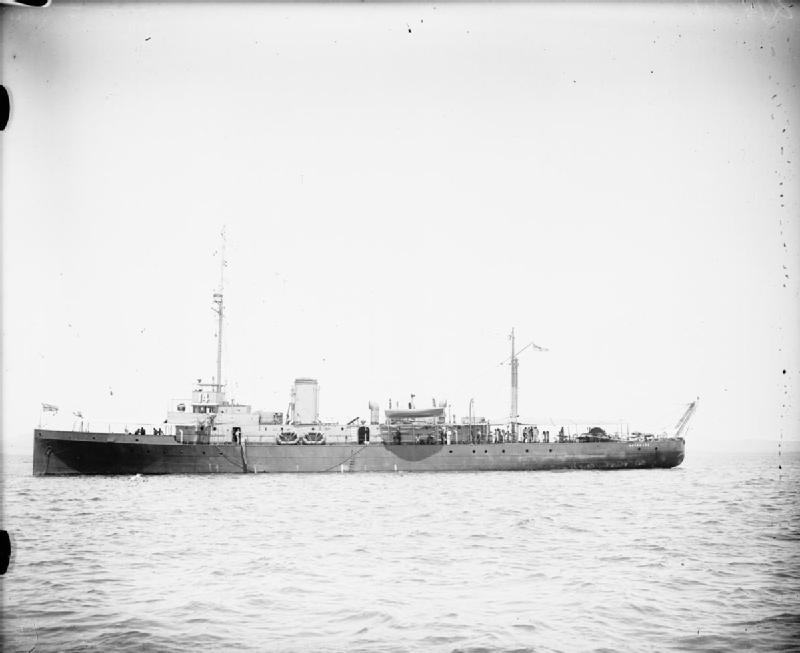
- Sister-ship to HMS Crozier, HMS Aberdare was a Hunt-class minesweeper of the same Aberdare sub-class before being refitting as a survey vessel and renamed HMSAS Protea.

United Kingdom
- Name: HMS Crozier
- Namesake: Polar explorer Captain Francis Crozier
- Commissioned: 1 July 1919
- Decommissioned: 1921
- Fate: converted to hydrographic survey vessel and transferred to South African Naval forces on 28 November 1921

South Africa
- Name: HMSAS Protea
- Namesake: Protea - a genus of South African flowering plants.
- Acquired: 28 November 1921
- Commissioned: 1 April 1922
- Decommissioned: 30 April 1933
- Fate: Returned to Royal Navy 30 April 1933
- Notes: Commissioned into South African forces as HMS 'Crouzier' on 1 April 1922, renamed HMSAS Protea 2 December 1922.

United Kingdom
- Name: HMS Protea
- Acquired: 30 April 1933
- Stricken: 1935
- Fate: Sold to Blackpool Steam Navigation Co. in 1935 for £1,000

United Kingdom
- Name: SS Queen of the Bay
- Owner: Blackpool Steam Navigation Co
- Port of registry: Blackpool
- Acquired: 1935
- Fate: Sold to Spanish Navy

Spain (Second Republic)
- Name: Lieutenant Captain Remigio Verdia
- Owner: Spanish Navy
- Acquired: 1938
- Fate: Ran aground Cartagena in Spain in 1939
- Notes: blockade runner during the Spanish Civil War (1936-1939) to supply to the anti-fascist forces.

General characteristics (as built)
- Class & type: Hunt-class minesweeper (1916)
- Displacement: 800 long tons (813 t) (standard)
- Length: 70.4 m (231 ft) o/a
- Beam: 8.71 m (28.6 ft)
- Draught: 2.29 m (7.5 ft)
- Installed power: 2× 3 cyl cylindrical boilers
- Propulsion: 2× shaft
- Speed: 16 knots (30 km/h; 18 mph)
- Range: 1,500 nmi (2,800 km; 1,700 mi) at 10 knots (19 km/h; 12 mph)
- Complement: 85 (7 officers and 78 other ranks)
- Armament: 1x QF 3-pounder Vickers (47 mm / L50) gun. Later removed when converted to survey vessel.

HMSAS Protea was the first hydrographic survey ship used by the South African Naval Service (which later became the South African Navy). The ship was laid down as a minesweeper to be named HMS Ventnor in 1917 but was renamed HMS Verwood in 1918 while under construction. She was again re-named and launched as HMS Crozier on 1 July 1919. The vessel was converted from a minesweeper to a hydrographic survey vessel in 1921 and transferred to the South African forces in 1922, where she was commissioned as HMSAS Protea. She served as a survey vessel until 1933 when she was returned to the Royal Navy. Protea was eventually sold by the Royal Navy and renamed MV Queen of the Bay where she went on to operate as a pleasure craft out of Blackpool. She was subsequently sold to the Spanish Navy and renamed Lieutenant Captain Remigio Verdia, and used as supply vessel to run blockades, smuggling supplies to the anti-fascists in Spain during the civil war. She ran aground and sunk off Cartagena in Spain in 1939.

== Royal Navy history ==
Whilst named HMS Crozier (and commanded by Cdr D.E. St M. Delius OBE) the ship was re-assigned from the Royal Navy to the South African Naval Service and was to sail to South Africa, together with two minesweeper trawlers (HMS Eden and HMS Foyle). They ships became the first vessels of what was later to become the South African Navy. and these three ships were to be transferred to South Africa under the terms of an Imperial Conference held in London in 1921. Under these clauses, South Africa would assume responsibility for hydrographic survey of its own waters, create a permanent sea-going navy, and expand the dockyard in Simonstown. To assist the South Africans, the British Government agreed to donate a survey ship and two minesweepers to South Africa, with Crozier, Eden and Foyle being the nominated ships. (Note: Once in South African service, these three ships were named after prominent South African flowers. Crozier became Protea with Eden becoming Immortelle and Foyle was renamed Sonneblom) They sailed from Devonport, Plymouth on 15 December 1921

The three ship convoy reached Madeira on 23 December 1921 and stopped in Sierra Leone to take on coal, drinking water and provisions. They next called at Lagos and Luanda and then Walvis Bay in South West Africa after a 14-day voyage and reached Simon's Bay on 11 January 1922, after a voyage of 50 days. There was no official welcome for the first ships of the new navy, but there was a report in the Cape Times that read "His Majesty's Surveying Vessel Crozier, which with the trawlers Eden and Foyle, have been acquired by the Union Government to form the nucleus of the South African Navy, arrived here last night from England, calling en route at Gibraltar, Las Palmas, Sierra Leone, Lagos, St Paul de Loanda and Walfisch Bay. SM."

== South African Naval Service history ==
Although being commissioned on 1 April 1922, she retained the name Crozier for a year after arriving in South Africa and was renamed HMSAS Protea on 2 December 1922.

HMSAS Protea was refitted as a pleasure craft and renamed SS Queen of the Bay circa. 1935.

== Notes and references ==
=== Bibliography ===
- Du Toit, Allan (1992). South Africa's Fighting Ships: Past and Present. Rivonia, South Africa: Ashanti Publishing. ISBN 1-874800-50-2.
- Monick, Dr. S. (1990). "A man who knew men: The memoirs of Maj. J.G. Ind". Scientia Militaria: South African Journal of Military Studies. 20 (1).
- Wessels, Andre (2012). "(EN: Hydrographic survey ships in the service of the South African navy, 1922-2012) Hidrografiese opmetingskepe in diens van die Suid-Afrikaanse vloot, 1922-2012". Kovsie Scholar Repository, University of Free State. 37 (1): 232–250.
