= HMS Eugenie =

Two vessels of the Royal Navy have borne the name HMS Eugenie:

- HMS Eugenie (1797) was the French razee privateer Nouvelle Eugenie that HMS Indefatigable captured on 19 May 1797. The Navy sold her on 3 January 1803.
- HMS Eugenie (1804) was launched at Ipswich in 1800 as the mercantile Friends. She sailed as a West Indiaman between London and Jamaica until the British Royal Navy purchased her in 1804. By 1807 the Navy had withdrawn her from service, and in 1810 it sold her. She then returned to mercantile service.

== See also ==
- HSwMS Eugenie
