= French ship Espoir =

Four ships of the French Navy have borne the name of Espoir, in honour of hope.

== French ship named Espoir ==
- Espoir (1788), a Hasard-class brig-aviso
- Espoir (1795), a storeship
- Espoir (1939), a police patrol boat
- L'Espoir (Q167, 1931), a Redoutable-class submarine
Ships of the French Navy named Espoir
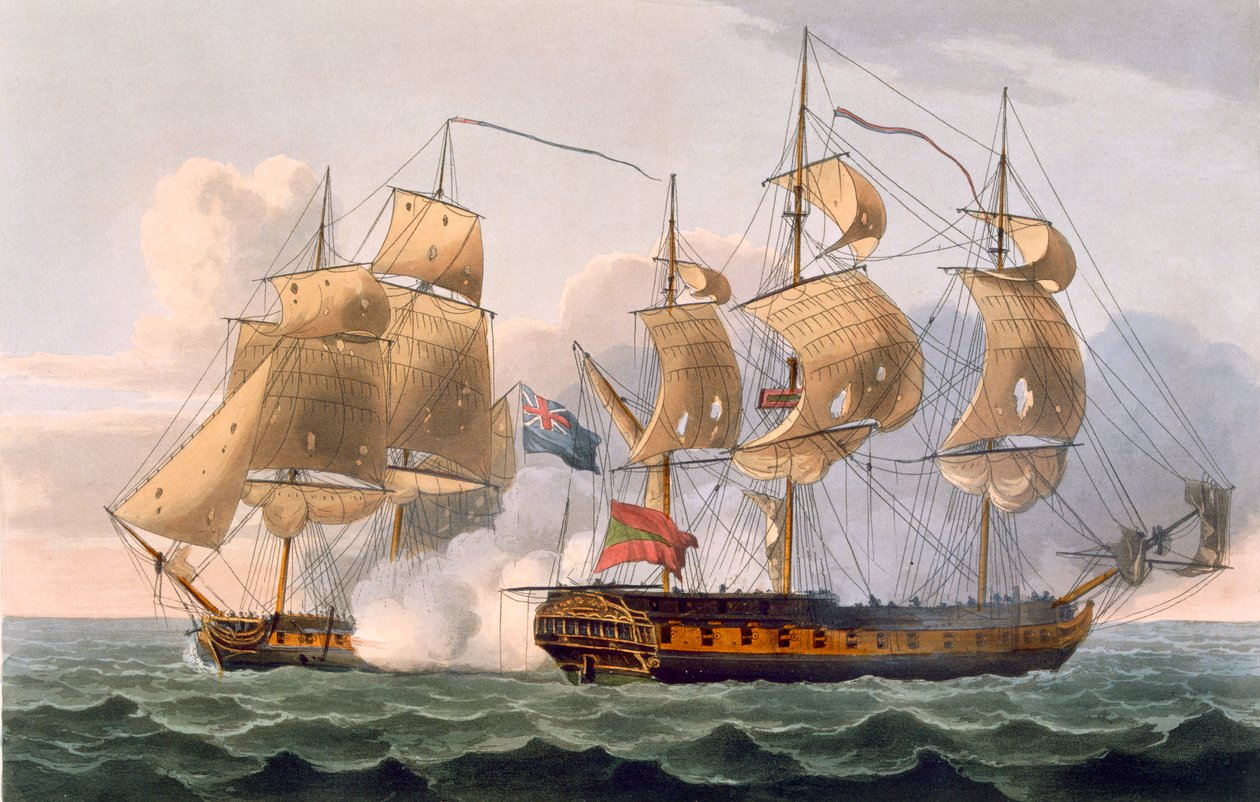
Espoir and Liguria, with Gibraltar in the background. Aquatint by Nicholas Pocock, 1801

== See also ==
- French ship Espérance
- HMS Espoir and HMS Hope

== Notes and references ==
=== Bibliography ===
- Roche, Jean-Michel (2005). Dictionnaire des bâtiments de la flotte de guerre française de Colbert à nos jours. Vol. 1. Group Retozel-Maury Millau. p. 183. ISBN 978-2-9525917-0-6. OCLC 165892922.
- Roche, Jean-Michel (2005). Dictionnaire des bâtiments de la flotte de guerre française de Colbert à nos jours. Vol. 2. Group Retozel-Maury Millau. p. 197. ISBN 978-2-9525917-0-6. OCLC 165892922.
