= Exploitation =

Exploitation may refer to:

- Exploitation of natural resources
- Exploitation of labour
  - Forced labour
- Exploitation colonialism
- Slavery
  - Sexual slavery and other forms
- Oppression
- Psychological manipulation

== In arts and entertainment ==
- Exploitation fiction
- Exploitation film

== As a proper name ==
- Exploitation (film), a 2012 film

== See also ==
- Exploit (disambiguation)
- Overexploitation
