= Exploit =

Exploit means to take advantage of something (a person, situation, etc.) for one's own end, especially unethically or unjustifiably.

Exploit can mean:

- Exploitation of natural resources
- Exploit (computer security)
- Video game exploit
- Exploitation of labour, Marxist and other sociological aspects

== Geography ==
- Exploits River, the longest river on the island of Newfoundland
- Bay of Exploits, a bay of Newfoundland

== Other ==
- Exploit (video game), a browser video game by Gregory Weir
- Exploit, episode of documentary Dark Net (TV series) 2016
- HMS Exploit, ships of the Royal Navy

== See also ==
- The Exploited, a Scottish punk band
- Overexploitation
- Exploitation (disambiguation)
