= British F-class submarine =

Class of British submarines

Class overview
- Operators: Royal Navy
- Built: 1913-1916
- In service: 1915–1922
- Planned: 10
- Completed: 3
- Retired: 3

General characteristics
- Type: Submarine
- Displacement: 353 long tons (359 t) surfaced; 525 long tons (533 t) submerged
- Length: 151 ft (46.0 m)
- Beam: 16 ft 1.25 in (4.91 m)
- Draught: 10 ft 7 in (3.23 m)
- Propulsion: 2 shaft diesels, 2 electric motors, 900bhp/400shp
- Speed: 14.5 knots (26.9 km/h; 16.7 mph) surfaced; 8.75 knots (16.21 km/h; 10.07 mph) submerged
- Range: 3,000 nmi (5,600 km) at 9 kn (17 km/h; 10 mph)
- Complement: 19
- Armament: 3 × 18 in (45 cm) torpedo tubes (2 bow/1 stern), 6 torpedoes; 1 × 2-pounder deck gun

The F-class submarine was built for the Royal Navy as a coastal submarine based on the doubled hulled V-class submarine (World War I) with very few minor improvements. The only important improvement was the addition of a stern torpedo tube. The F class were ordered as a successor to the E-class submarine, but only three were built out of the ten ordered, the first F1 at Chatham.

During World War I, the F-class submarines were primarily used for coastal defence. All three survived the war and ended their service as training boats at Campbeltown. F1 and F3 were scrapped in 1920, F2 was sold in 1922.

== Boats ==
- HMS F1, launched 1915
- HMS F2, launched 1917
- HMS F3, launched 1916
