= RFA Engadine =

1967 Helicopter support ship of the Royal Fleet Auxiliary

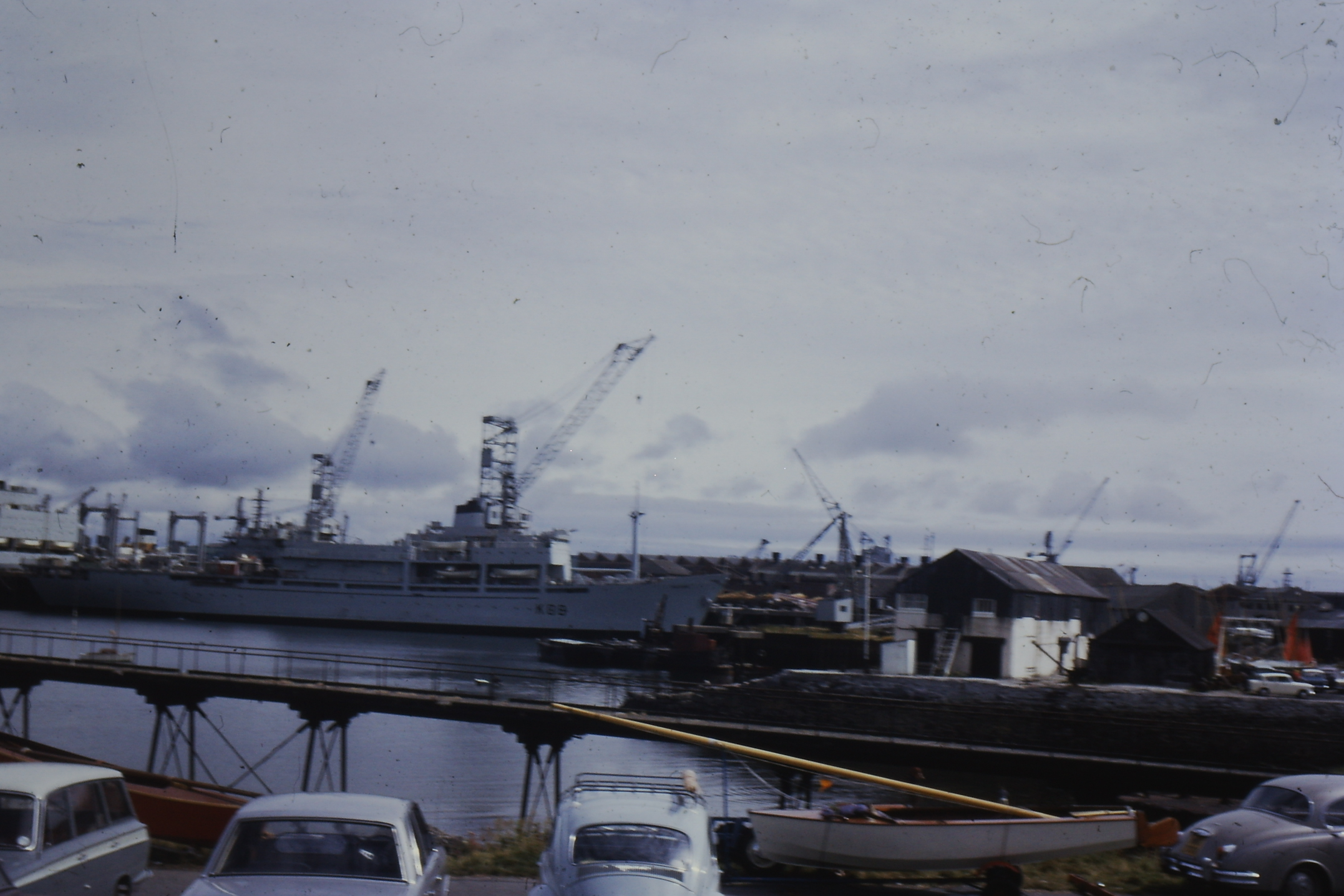
- Engadine, somewhere between 1969 and 1973, Falmouth, on the south coast of Cornwall (Falmouth Submarine pier in foreground).

History

United Kingdom
- Name: RFA Engadine
- Ordered: 18 August 1964
- Builder: Henry Robb Ltd, Leith
- Laid down: 9 August 1965
- Launched: 16 September 1966
- Commissioned: 15 December 1967
- Decommissioned: March 1989. Laid up at Devonport.
- Identification: IMO number: 6800684; Pennant number: K08
- Fate: Scrapped 23 September 1996
- Badge: Two crossed alphorns surrounded by 12 edelweiss flowers on a dark blue background.

General characteristics
- Type: Helicopter Support Ship
- Displacement: 8,950 tons (full load)
- Length: 129.31 metres (424 ft 3 in)
- Beam: 17.86 metres (58.6 feet)
- Draught: 7 metres (22 ft 6 in)
- Installed power: 5,500 bhp
- Propulsion: 1 × 5 cylinder Sulzer marine diesel. One shaft.
- Speed: 16 knots (30 km/h)
- Complement: 63 RFA + 32 RN + 131 under training
- Aircraft carried: 4 × Westland Wessex Or 2 × Westland Sea King and 2 × Westland Wasp helicopters

RFA Engadine (K08) was a helicopter support ship of the Royal Fleet Auxiliary.

The need for Engadine was seen in the mid-1960s as more and more helicopters were deployed from Royal Navy aircraft carriers and surface combatants. The ship was ordered in August 1964, from Henry Robb of Leith, and commissioned in December 1967, replacing HMS Lofoten. She was the third British ship named HMS Engadine the previous two being a seaplane carrier and an aircraft transport ship. Engadine comes from the Engadin valley in south-east Switzerland, which is represented by the alphorns and edelweiss on her badge.

In 1968 she was designated as one of the PYTHON locations for the dispersal and continuity of government in the event of nuclear war.

Engadine's homeport throughout her career was Portland, Dorset. During the 1976 crisis in Lebanon she was deployed as part of contingency planning to evacuate British citizens.

At the Silver Jubilee fleet review in 1977 she followed the royal yacht HMY Britannia.

In the Falklands War she was a helicopter support and refuelling ship in San Carlos Water.

By the mid-1980s Engadine was becoming obsolescent so the container ship MV Contender Bezant was bought for conversion, becoming RFA Argus. Engadine was decommissioned in 1989 and sold to new owners in Greece. She arrived at Piraeus on 18 February 1990 after being bought by Greek owners for a new service which never materialised and the ship was laid up, name unchanged. She was sold for scrap and arrived at Alang for demolition on 7 May 1996 which commenced on 23 September 1996.

== Bibliography ==
- Adams, Thomas A. (August 2021). Osborne, Richard (ed.). "RFA Engadine (1967-1989) Helicopter Support Ship". Warships: Marine News Supplement. 75 (8): 392–398. ISSN 0966-6958.
