= HMS Fame =

Nine ships of the Royal Navy have been named HMS Fame, whilst another was planned:

- HMS Fame (1646) was a 20-gun Irish Royalist ship. She was captured by the Parliamentarians in 1649 and was blown up in 1658.
- HMS Fame (1655) was a 30-gun ship, previously the French ship Renommee. She was captured in 1655 and expended as a fireship in 1665.
- HMS Fame (1709) was a 24-gun sixth rate captured from the French in 1665. She was retaken by the French in 1710.
- HMS Fame (1744) was a 14-gun sloop captured in 1744. She foundered in the Atlantic Ocean in 1745.
- HMS Fame (1759) was a 74-gun third rate launched in 1759. She became a prison ship in 1799 and was renamed HMS Guildford. She was sold in 1814.
- HMS Fame (1805) was a 74-gun third rate launched in 1805 and broken up in 1817.
- HMS Fame was a 74-gun third rate launched in 1798 as HMS Dragon. She was on harbour service from 1824, and was renamed HMS Fame when hulked in 1842. She was broken up in 1850.
- HMS Fame was to have been a wooden Rosario-class screw sloop. She was laid down in 1861 but was cancelled in 1863.
- HMS Fame (1896) was a D-class destroyer launched in 1896 and sold in 1921.
- HMS Fame (H78) was F-class destroyer launched in 1934. She was sold to the Dominican Republic in 1949 and renamed Generalissimo. She was renamed Sanchez in 1962 and was discarded in 1968.

== See also ==
- HMS Fama
- Fame - a former French privateer which saw brief service as a British privateer frigate in 1804-05
