= Dartmouth =

Dartmouth may refer to:

== Places ==
- Dartmouth, Devon, England
  - Dartmouth Harbour
  - Dartmouth (UK Parliament constituency)
- Dartmouth, Massachusetts, United States
- Dartmouth, Nova Scotia, Canada
  - Dartmouth (electoral district)
- Dartmouth, Victoria, Australia

== Institutions ==
- Dartmouth College, a private Ivy League university in Hanover, New Hampshire, United States
  - Dartmouth Big Green, athletic teams representing the college
  - The Dartmouth, a newspaper of Dartmouth College
- Dartmouth University, a defunct university (1817–1819) in New Hampshire
- University of Massachusetts Dartmouth, a university in Dartmouth, Massachusetts, United States
- Dartmouth–Hitchcock Medical Center, a research hospital in Lebanon, New Hampshire
- Britannia Royal Naval College or Dartmouth, a college in Dartmouth, Devon, England

== Ships ==
- HMS Dartmouth, ships of the Royal Navy
- Dartmouth, a ship that had its tea dumped into the Boston Harbor during the Boston Tea Party

== Other uses ==
- The Dartmouth (Indianapolis, Indiana), a historic apartment building

== See also ==
- Earl of Dartmouth, a title in the Peerage of Great Britain
- Port of Dartmouth Royal Regatta
- RCAF Station Dartmouth, now CFB Shearwater, a Canadian military aerodrome
