= HMS Daffodil =

A number of Royal Navy ships have been named Daffodil.

- HMS Daffodil (1906), a Mersey ferry requisitioned for the Zeebrugge Raid in 1918
- HMS Daffodil (1915) was an Acacia-class sloop launched in 1915 and sold for breaking up in 1935.
- HMS Daffodil (1940), former TF3 train ferry converted into a Landing Ship Sternchute (LSS) during World War II and sunk in 1945
- HMS Dianella (K07), a Flower-class corvette, was to have been called HMS Daffodil but was renamed on 26 October 1940
