= HMS Delphinium =

Two ships of the Royal Navy have been named HMS Delphinium:

- HMS Delphinium (1915) was an Arabis-class sloop launched in 1915 and sold in 1933
- HMS Delphinium (K77) was a Flower-class corvette, launched in 1940 and scrapped in 1949
