= English ship Fairfax =

English ship Fairfax may refer to the following ships:

- English ship Fairfax (1650), a Speaker-class frigate, accidentally burned in 1653
- English ship Fairfax (1653), a Speaker-class frigate

== See also ==
- Fairfax (disambiguation)
