= HMS Favourite =

Seven ships of the Royal Navy have borne the name HMS Favourite, or HMS Favorite:

- HMS Favourite (1740) may have been a 14-gun sloop launched in 1740.
- HMS Favorite (1757) was a 14-gun sloop launched in 1757 and sold in 1784.
- HMS Favourite (1794) was a 16-gun sloop launched in 1794. The French captured her in 1806 and renamed her Favorite, but the British recaptured her in 1807 and renamed her HMS Goree. She became a prison ship in 1814 and was broken up in 1817.
- HMS Favorite (1805) was a survey cutter purchased in 1805 and sold c. 1813.
- HMS Favorite (1806) was an 18-gun Cormorant-class ship-sloop broken up in 1821.
- HMS Favourite (1829) was an 18-gun sloop launched in 1829. She became a coal hulk in 1859 and was sold in 1905. She bore the name Favorite between 1836 and 1856, and was designated C3 and later C77 while in use as a coal hulk.
- HMS Favorite (1864) was an ironclad screw corvette launched in 1864 and sold in 1886.

== Other ==
On 10 March 1806 the Principal Officers and Commissioners of His Majesty's Navy offered "His Majesty's Schooner Favorite", "lying at Portsmouth", for sale. It is not clear what vessel this was.
