= HMS Folkestone =

Six ships of the Royal Navy have borne the name HMS Folkestone or the archaic HMS Folkeston, after the town of Folkestone in Kent:

- HMS Folkeston (1299) was a cog, part of the Cinque Ports Fleet in 1299.
- HMS Folkeston (1703) was a 44-gun fourth rate launched in 1703 and broken up in 1727.
- HMS Folkeston (1741) was a 44-gun fifth rate launched in 1741 and sold in 1749.
- HMS Folkestone (1764) (or Folkestone), was an 8-gun cutter launched in 1764. On 24 June 1778 the French frigate Surveillante captured her off Ushant. The French navy purchased Folkestone for Lt12,405 and took her into service under her existing name. She was struck off the lists in 1782 or early 1783.
- HMS Folkestone (1914) was a World War I minesweeper. A mercantile conversion, M.33 (1914). Built 1903, 496 GRT. Armament was two 12 pdr guns. In service from 9 October 1914 to 31 January 1920.
- HMS Folkestone (L22) was a Folkestone-class sloop launched in 1930, sold in 1947 and broken up later that year.
