= HMS Dispatch =

Seventeen ships of the Royal Navy have borne the name HMS Dispatch, or the variant HMS Despatch:

- HMS Despatch (1691) was a 2-gun brigantine launched in 1691 and sold in 1712.
- HMS Despatch (1745) was a 14-gun sloop launched in 1745 and sold in 1763.
- HMS Dispatch (1772) was a 14-gun sloop that foundered in a hurricane in 1772. She may have been salved and sold in 1773.
- HMS Dispatch (1776) was an 8-gun sloop captured in 1776 by the American privateer Tyrannicide.
- HMS Despatch was a transport purchased in 1774 as the 6-gun armed ship HMS Cherokee. She was renamed HMS Despatch in 1777 and sold in 1783.
- HMS Dispatch was a 16-gun sloop launched in 1777. She capsized in 1778.
- HMS Dispatch was an 8-gun schooner purchased in 1780 and sold in 1795.
- HMS Dispatch was a 14-gun sloop launched in 1779 as HMS Zephyr. She was renamed HMS Navy Transport in 1782, HMS Dispatch in 1783 and was sold in 1798.
- HMS Dispatch (1790) was a sloop captured from the French in 1790 and sold in 1801.
- Dispatch (1795 ship) was a 16-gun Albatross-class brig-sloop launched in 1795 and never commissioned but instead sold to the Russian Navy that year, and transferred in 1796. She was wrecked in 1805.
- HMS Dispatch (1797) was a 6-gun tender in service between 1797 and 1801.
- HMS Dispatch (1799) was an 18-gun sloop, previously the French privateer Indefatigable. She was captured in 1799 and sold in 1801.
- HMS Dispatch (1804) was an 18-gun Cruizer-class brig-sloop launched in 1804 and broken up in 1811.
- HMS Despatch (1812) was an 18-gun Cruizer-class brig-sloop launched in 1812 and sold in 1836. She burnt at sea on 11 March 1839.
- HMS Dispatch (1816) was a 6-gun brig-storeship transferred from the Transport Office c. 1816. She was hulked in 1820, used as a sheer hulk from 1826 and wrecked in 1846. She was ordered to be broken up, but remained listed until 1865.
- HMS Despatch (1851) was a 12-gun brig launched in 1851. She became Watch Vessel No. 24 under the name HMS Cadmus in 1863, and was sold in 1901.
- HMS Despatch (D30) was a Danae-class light cruiser launched in 1919 and sold in 1946.
