= HMS Ethalion =

Two ships of the Royal Navy have been named HMS Ethalion after Ethalion, a mythical Greek sailor transformed into a dolphin for attempting to abduct Dionysus, whilst another was planned:

- HMS Ethalion (1797) was a fifth-rate frigate launched in 1797 which served in the French Revolutionary Wars but was wrecked in 1799.
- HMS Ethalion (1802) was a fifth-rate frigate launched in 1802 which served in the Napoleonic Wars. She was used for harbour service from 1823, was lent to the Harwich Corporation as a breakwater in 1835 and was on navy lists until 1877.
- HMS Ethalion was to have been a Colossus-class aircraft carrier. She was renamed HMS Mars in 1942, but was then renamed HMS Pioneer before her launch in 1944.
