= HMS Elgin =

HMS Elgin has been the name of two Royal Navy vessels:

- HMS Elgin, also known as Countess of Elgin, an armed ship in service 1811–1814
- HMS Elgin (1919), a Hunt-class minesweeper launched in 1919
