= HMS Expedition =

Six vessels of the Royal Navy have been named HMS Expedition:

- English ship Expedition (1618) was a 20-gun French ship captured in 1618 and last listed in 1652
- English ship Expedition (1637) was a 30-gun ship launched in 1637 and sold in 1667
- HMS Expedition (1679) was a 70-gun ship of the line launched in 1679. She was renamed Prince Frederick in 1715 and sold in 1784
- HMS Expedition (1747) was a 44-gun frigate launched in 1747 and broken up in 1764
- HMS Expedition (1778) was a 14-gun cutter launched in 1778 and listed until 1801
- HMS Expedition (1784) was a 44-gun frigate launched in 1784. She became a 26-gun troopship in 1798 and was broken up in 1817
