= HMT Elk =

British trawler sunk off Plymouth in 1940

History

United Kingdom
- Name: HMT Elk
- Builder: Cook, Welton & Gemmell, Beverley
- Yard number: 329
- Launched: 21 August 1902
- Commissioned: 1914
- Decommissioned: 1918
- Recommissioned: 1939
- Fate: Sunk by mine, 27 November 1940

General characteristics
- Type: Naval trawler
- Tonnage: 181 GRT; 70 NRT
- Length: 33.1 m (109 ft)
- Beam: 6.4 m (21 ft)
- Propulsion: Triple expansion steam engine, 62 hp (46 kW), single screw
- Sail plan: Ketch-rigged
- Complement: 10
- Armament: 1 × 6-pounder gun

HMT Elk was a 181-ton former fishing trawler built in 1902. She served in the Royal Navy in World War II, until sunk without loss of life having hit a mine off Plymouth in November 1940.

== Ship history ==
Elk was built by Cook, Welton & Gemmell at Beverley, Yorkshire, launched on 21 August 1902, and first operated from Grimsby. During World War I she was hired by the Admiralty and served as a minesweeper from 1914 until 1918. She was then operated commercially by various owners at Grimsby, Hakin, and Plymouth. Elk was hired by the Admiralty in November 1939 to serve as a danlayer (laying buoys in channels cleared by minesweepers) and was armed with one 6-pounder gun. HMT Elk was sunk by a mine south-east of Penlee Point, Plymouth on 27 November 1940. There were no casualties.

The Elk was re-discovered by divers in 1981 upright on a sandy bed at 50°17.800′N 4°10.600′W in 30 metres (98 ft) of water with a drop-off in excess of 40 metres (130 ft).

== See also ==
- Trawlers of the Royal Navy – List of trawlers of the Royal Navy
