= French brig Duc de Chartres (1780 Le Havre) =

History

France
- Name: Duc de Chartres
- Builder: Le Havre
- Launched: 1780
- Captured: Spring 1781

Great Britain
- Name: HMS Duc de Chartres
- Commissioned: 7 October 1781
- Out of service: Paid off in May 1784
- Fate: Sold July 1784

General characteristics
- Tons burthen: Privateer: 220 (French; of load); HMS: 4267/94 (bm)
- Length: 109 ft 2 in (33.3 m) (overall); 86 ft 5 1/2 in (26.4 m) (keel)
- Beam: 30 ft 5 1/4 in (9.3 m)
- Depth of hold: 11 ft 11 1/2 in (3.6 m) (overall)
- Propulsion: Sail
- Complement: HMS:125
- Armament: At capture: 18 guns; HMS; Upperdeck:18 × 6-pounder guns; QD:4 × 12-pounder carronades

The French brig Duc de Chartres was built between 1779 and 1780 at Le Havre as a 24-gun privateer. As a privateer she captured one British warship before in 1781 the Royal Navy captured her. The Royal Navy took her into service as HMS Duc de Chartres. She then captured several American privateers and armed merchant vessels, and one French naval corvette in a noteworthy single-ship action. The Navy sold Duc de Chartres in 1784.

== Privateer ==
Duc de Chartres captured HMS Pluto, a 16-gun sloop, on 30 November 1780. Pluto, under the command of Commander Thomas Geary, was about 140 miles south west of the Scilly Isles in drifting fog when she sighted a ship. Cautious, Pluto prepared for action and when the two vessels passed each other, they exchanged broadsides. Duc de Chartres turned and gave chase, catching up with her quarry. Unable to escape, and outgunned, Pluto struck. (Note: Pluto's subsequent fate is unknown.)

Duc de Chartres also captured the hired brig Earl of Inchquin on 15 March 1781. Earl of Inchquin, of six guns and under the command of Lieutenant William Robertson, was in the Channel when she encountered Duc de Chartres, which gave chase. The French privateers Bougainville (24 or 32 guns), and Tartare (12 guns), joined the chase. Unable to escape, Robertson struck.

In March 1781 Lloyd's List reported that Duc de Chartres had captured the Bristol privateer Chance, Webb, master.

In spring 1781, Admiral George Darby sailed a fleet to Gibraltar to relieve the siege for a second time. On the way the fleet captured Duc de Chartres, the Spanish frigate Santa Leucadia, and the French brig Trois Amis. Although HMS Cumberland executed the actual capture of Duc de Chartres, the entire British fleet of 42 vessels shared in the resulting prize money.

At the time of her capture Duc de Chartres was under the command of Jean-Baptiste l'Écolier. The Royal Navy took her into service as HMS Duc de Chartres. The capture of Leocadia took place in the action of 1 May 1781, off Brest. The Royal Navy took her into service as HMS Leocadia.

== HMS Duc de Chartres ==
Between 26 May and 17 September Duc de Chartres was at Portsmouth undergoing coppering and fitting. The Royal Navy commissioned Duc de Chartres under Commander John Child Purvis on 7 October 1781 and he immediately sailed her for North America.

Around August 1782 Duc de Chartres captured the Connecticut letter of marque schooner Turn of Times. She was armed with four guns and had a crew of 25 men under the command of John Cook. She had sailed to Demerara and was on her return voyage when the British captured her and sent her into Bermuda.

On 9 August 1782, Duc de Chartres encountered the French navy's corvette Aigle, of 22 guns and 136 men. In the subsequent hour-long action, Aigle lost 13 men killed, including her captain, and 15 wounded; Duc de Chartres had no casualties. (Note: This is probably the ex-British privateer brig Eagle captured in March 1780 at Saint Eustache in the Antilles. Arrived at Lorient in January 1782 and listed as a corvette with twenty 6-pounder guns. A French source mis-identifies Aigle as HMS Eagle, and gives her dates of service as 1780-1783. It describes her as having sixteen 6-pounder guns and six swivel guns.)

On 15 March 1783 the British frigates Astraea and Vestal, and Duc de Chartres captured the Massachusetts letter of marque Julius Caesar. Julius Caesar was a privateer of eighteen 9-pounder guns and carried a crew of 100 men under the command of Captain Thomas Benson, of Salem. Her captors sent her into New York City where the Vice admiralty court condemned her.

Duc de Chartres captured the Connecticut armed brig Thetis on 2 April. Thetis, of 100 tons (bm) and six guns, had a crew of 21 men under the command of Robert Colfax. She was tried and condemned at New York.

The highly successful action against Aigle led, on 1 September 1783, to Purvis receiving promotion to post-captain.

Commander John Shairp replaced Purvis. Then in 1784 Captain William Afleck replaced Shairp for the purpose of sailing Duc de Chartres back to Britain.

== Fate ==
Duc de Chartres was paid off in May 1784. The Navy sold her on 1 July for £700.
