= HMS Duckworth =

HMS Duckworth can refer to:

- HMS Duckworth (BDE-19) a destroyer escort under construction in the US but completed in May 1943 for the USN as USS Burden R. Hastings.
- HMS Duckworth (K351) a destroyer escort laid down as USS Gary (DE-61) but transferred on completion in August 1943 to the RN as a Captain-class frigate.
