= HMS Firedrake =

Six ships of the Royal Navy have borne the name HMS Firedrake after the fire-breathing dragon of Anglo-Saxon mythology.

- HMS Firedrake (1688) was a 12-gun bomb vessel launched in 1688 and captured by the French in 1689.
- HMS Firedrake (1693) was a 12-gun bomb vessel launched in 1693. She foundered in 1710.
- HMS Firedrake (1741) was a 12-gun bomb vessel launched in 1741 and sold in 1763.
- HMS Firedrake (1794) was a fireship purchased in 1794 and sold in 1807.
- HMS Firedrake (1912) was an Acheron-class destroyer launched in 1912 and sold in 1921.
- HMS Firedrake (H79) was an F-class destroyer launched in 1934 and sunk in 1942.
