= HMS Engadine =

Two warships of the Royal Navy have been called HMS Engadine. A third was commissioned as part of the Royal Fleet Auxiliary as RFA Engadine.

- HMS Engadine (1911) was a seaplane tender which served in the First World War and was present at the Battle of Jutland. She was originally a merchant ship named after the Engadine valley in Switzerland, and the name was retained.
- HMS Engadine (1941) was an aircraft transport ship launched in May 1941.
- RFA Engadine was a Royal Fleet Auxiliary helicopter support ship that took part in the Falklands War.

== Battle honours ==
- Jutland, 1916
- Atlantic 1943
- Falkland Islands, 1982
