= HMS Diligence =

A number of ships of the Royal Navy have borne the name HMS Diligence.

- HMS Diligence (1756) was an eight-gun sloop built in 1756, renamed Comet and converted to a fireship in 1779, but sold that year.
- HMS Diligence (1795) was an 18-gun brig sloop. Originally HMS Spencer, she was renamed HMS Diligence before being launched in 1795. She was lost in 1800.
- HMS Diligence (1801) was the former mercantile Union, purchased in 1801 and sold in 1812.
- HMS Diligence (1814) was part of Inglefield’s 1854 Arctic expedition.
- HMS Diligence was a 17-gun Camelion-class sloop laid down in 1861 but cancelled on 12 December 1863.
- HMS Diligence (1915) was a destroyer depot ship, formerly the civilian Tabaristan, purchased in October 1915. She was scrapped in 1926.
- HMS Diligence (F174) was a repair ship, formerly USS Diligence (BAR-18) was transferred under terms of the Lend-lease Act to the Royal Navy and returned to the US Navy in 1946.
- HMS Diligence (shore establishment) was a base at Hythe, Hampshire for the minesweepers and motor torpedo boats of the reserve fleet, which opened in 1953.
- RFA Diligence (A132) fleet repair ship of the Royal Fleet Auxiliary, formerly the civilian MV Stena Inspector, purchased in October 1983.

== See also ==
HMS Diligent
