= HMS Falkland =

Two ships of the Royal Navy have borne the name HMS Falkland, probably after the former Royal burgh of Falkland, Fife:

- HMS Falkland (1696) was a 54-gun fourth-rate ship of the line, purchased in 1696. She was the first warship to be built in what would become the United States. She was rebuilt several times and transferred out of the Royal Navy in 1768.
- HMS Falkland (1853) was an 18-gun sloop launched in 1853 and sold in 1862.

There was also HMS Falkland Prize, formerly the 44-gun French fluyt Seine. She was captured by the first HMS Falkland and HMS Dreadnought in 1704 and renamed. She was wrecked in 1705, salvaged and then sold in 1706.
