= HMS Dexterous =

Two ships of the Royal Navy have borne the name HMS Dexterous or HMS Dextrous:

- HMS Dexterous (1805) (or Dextrous) was a gun-brig launched at Buckler's Hard in 1805. Between 1805 and 1807, Dexterous was operating out of Gibraltar, where she captured two small armed vessels, one naval and one a privateer. Thereafter Dexterous operated in the Channel, where she recaptured several British merchant vessels that French privateers had captured. The Navy sold Dexterous in 1816.
- HMS Dextrous was a screw frigate ordered in 1861, with the order being cancelled in 1863.
