= French ship Dauphin Royal (1668) =

Ship of the line of the French Navy

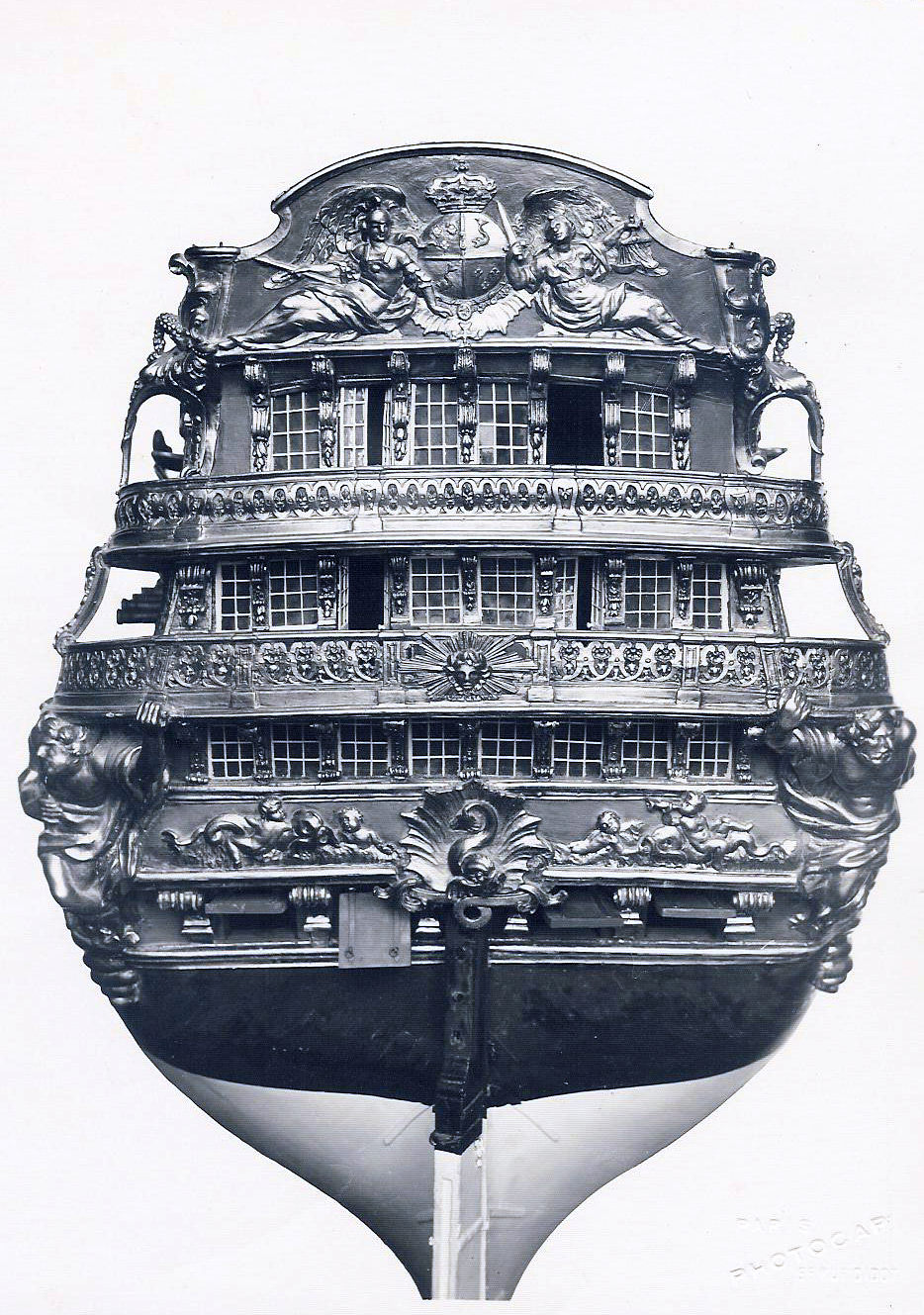
- Aft of Dauphin Royal

History

France
- Name: Dauphin Royal
- Namesake: The Dauphin of France, heir to the French throne
- Builder: François Pomet, in Toulon
- Laid down: March 1667
- Launched: 29 March 1668
- Completed: April 1670
- Out of service: November 1699
- Stricken: Sold June 1700
- Fate: Broken up 1700

General characteristics
- Class & type: ship of the line
- Tonnage: 1,800 tons
- Length: 159½ French feet (Note: The (pre-metric) French foot was 6.575% longer than the equivalent English foot.)
- Beam: 43½ French feet
- Draught: 24 French feet
- Depth of hold: 20 French feet
- Decks: 3 gun decks
- Complement: 640, +9 officers; later 750 then 780
- Armament: 100 (later 104) guns: 12 × 24-pounder long guns + 14 × 18-pounder long guns on lower deck, later replaced by 26 × 36-pounder long guns; 14 × 18-pounder long guns + 12 × 12-pounder long guns on middle deck, later replaced by 28 × 18-pounder long guns; 24 × 8-pounder long guns on upper deck, later increased to 28 × 8-pounder long guns; 18 × 6-pounder long guns on quarterdeck and forecastle
- Armour: Timber

Dauphin Royal was a 104-gun ship of the line of the French Royal Navy. She was built at Toulon Dockyard, designed and constructed by François Pomet. She took part in the Battle of Beachy Head on 10 July 1690 (N.S.) and the Battle of Lagos on 28 June 1693, both times as flagship of Lieutenant-Général Louis-François de Rousselet, Comte de Châteaurenault, under Vice-Admiral Tourville. She was decommissioned in 1698 or 1699, and broken up in 1700.
