= HMS Dagger =

Three ships of the British Royal Navy have been named HMS Dagger after the weapon:

- HMS Dagger, a Casa Grande-class dock landing ship built under Lend-Lease in the United States and renamed HMS Oceanway in August 1943 before completion. The vessel served in the Royal Navy until 1947 when it was lent to the Greek Navy. Returned to the United States in 1952, it was loaned to France and later purchased by the French Government. It was expended as a target in 1970.
- HMS Dagger (G23), a Weapon-class destroyer laid down in March 1945 but cancelled before completion.
- HMS Dagger (P296) one of the new Gibraltar fast patrol boats.
