= HMS Desperate =

Three ships of the Royal Navy have borne the name HMS Desperate, the adjective having the sense of "having reckless abandon in the pursuit of an extreme desire":

- HMS Desperate (1805), a 12-gun gun brig launched in 1805, (Note: Colledge has "White, Broadstairs, 2.1.1905", but given the sale date of 1814, this is an obvious typographical error.) converted to a mortar brig in 1811 and sold in 1814.
- HMS Desperate (1849), a wooden Conflict-class screw sloop launched in 1849 and broken up in 1865.
- HMS Desperate (1896), a Thornycroft two funnel, 30-knot destroyer (classified as a D-class destroyer in 1912) launched in 1896 and sold for breaking in 1920.

A further two vessels were ordered and later cancelled:

- HMS Desperate (1918), a Danae-class light cruiser ordered in March 1918 and cancelled in November the same year.
- HMS Desperate (1945), a Daring-class destroyer ordered in March 1945 and cancelled in January 1946.

== See also ==
- HMS Desperante (1799), an 8-gun schooner in service from 1799 to 1811.
