= HMS Fame (1709) =

History

France
- Name: La Renommee
- Captured: By Royal Navy, July 1709

History

Great Britain
- Name: HMS Fame
- Acquired: 6 July 1709
- Commissioned: 15 July 1709
- Captured: 21 September 1710
- Fate: Retaken by three French ships off Port Mahone

General characteristics
- Type: 24-gun Sixth Rate
- Tons burthen: 316 24/94 bm
- Length: 106 ft 0 in (32.3 m) gundeck; 88 ft 0 in (26.8 m) keel for tonnage
- Beam: 26 ft 0 in (7.9 m) for tonnage
- Depth of hold: 11 ft 0 in (3.4 m)
- Armament: 22 × guns on wooden trucks (UD)

HMS Fame was a 24-gun French privateer, La Renommee taken in the Mediterranean in July 1709. She was surveyed at Port Mahone 6 July 1709 and fitted out as per Admiral Byng's order. She was commissioned into the Royal Navy in July 1709 for service in the Mediterranean. She was retaken by three French ships off Port Mahone 21 September 1710.

Fame was the third named ship since it was used for a 24-gun sixth rate launched by Ellis of Shoreham on 29 November 1695, renamed Newport on 3 September 1698, and sold in 1714.

== Specifications ==
She was captured in July 1709 and surveyed on 6 July 1709. Her gundeck was 106 feet 0 inches (32.3 metres) with her keel for tonnage calculation of 88 feet 0 inches (26.8 metres). Her breadth for tonnage was 26 feet 0 inches (7.9 metres) with the depth of hold of 11 ft 0 in (3.4 m). Her tonnage calculation was 316 24/94 tons. Her armament was twenty-four, reduced to twenty-two guns.

== Commissioned service ==
She was commissioned on 15 July 1709 under the command of Commander Strensham, RN for service in the Mediterranean.

== Disposition ==
She was retaken by the 56-gun La Toulouse, the 40-gun La Vestal and the 30-gun La Meduse off Port Mahone on 21 September 1710 on 27 May 1709. She resumed her French name La Gaillarde.
