= Deptford Bridge =

Deptford Bridge may refer to:

- Deptford Bridge, an area of Deptford, London
  - Deptford Bridge DLR station
- Cornish Rebellion of 1497 which included the Battle of Deptford Bridge
