= HMS Eglantine =

Two ships of the Royal Navy have been named HMS Eglantine :

- HMS Eglantine (1917) an Anchusa-class sloop launched in 1917 and sold in 1921
- HMS Eglantine (K197), a Flower-class corvette launched and transferred to the Royal Norwegian Navy in 1941
