= HMS Deal Castle =

A number of ships of the Royal Navy were named Deal Castle, after the castle of the same name.

- HMS Deal Castle (1697), a sixth rate
- HMS Deal Castle (1706), a sixth rate
- HMS Deal Castle (1727), a fourth rate
- HMS Deal Castle (1746), a sixth rate
- HMS Deal Castle (1756), a sixth rate
