= HMS Dove (1805) =

United Kingdom
- Name: HMS Dove
- Acquired: 21 May 1805 by purchase
- Fate: Captured 5 August 1805

General characteristics
- Type: Schooner
- Tons burthen: 103 (bm)
- Length: 68 ft 0 in (20.7 m)
- Beam: 19 ft 4 1/2 in (5.9 m)
- Depth of hold: 6 ft 0 in (1.8 m)
- Propulsion: Sail
- Complement: 17
- Armament: 4 × 12-pounder carronades

HMS Dove was a mercantile vessel of unknown name or origin. The Admiralty purchased her on 21 May 1805 and registered her on 28 May. She underwent fitting at Deptford for foreign service between 21 May and 3 July. Lieutenant Alexander Boyack commissioned her.

== Capture ==
Boyack was in command on 5 August when Dove was in the Bay of Biscay, bound for Gibraltar. At 3 a.m. Dove sighted a large vessel ahead. As Dove tried to escape she lost one man overboard. Dove was unable to escape and when the enemy vessel came alongside and prepared to fire a broadside Dove struck her colours. Her captor proved to be the 22-gun Gloire.
