= HMS Dieppe =

HMS Dieppe was the name of two ships of the British Royal Navy.

- HMS Dieppe (1905), a steamship converted as a troopship, hospital ship, yacht (Rosaura) and RN armed boarding craft (HMS Rosaura); sunk 1941
- LST 3016, an LST Mark 3 later renamed HMS Dieppe; built by Hawthorn Leslie & Co. (Hebburn-on-Tyne, U.K.) in 1944 and sold in 1980
