= HMS Eridge =

Two ships of the Royal Navy have borne the name HMS Eridge:

- HMS Eridge (1916) was a Racecourse-class paddle minesweeper launched in 1916 and sold in 1922.
- HMS Eridge (L68) was a Hunt-class destroyer launched in 1940. She was disabled in 1942 by an Italian motor torpedo boat off Egypt and used as a base ship, before being scrapped in 1946.
