= HMS Dominica =

Four vessels of Britain's Royal Navy have borne the name HMS Dominica, named for the island of Dominica.

- HMS Dominica (1805) was a schooner purchased in 1805, whose crew mutinied in 1806 and turned her over to the French who sent her out as the privateer Napoleon. Within four days of the mutiny Wasp had recaptured her; she was taken back into service under her original name and broken up in 1808.
- HMS Dominica (1807) was the privateer schooner Tape a L’Oeil, which HMS Superieure captured in 1807. Dominica was lost in a hurricane off Tortola in August 1809.
- HMS Dominica (1810) was the French privateer schooner Duc de Wagram, which the Royal Navy captured in 1809 and purchased the next year. The American privateer Decatur captured her in 1813, but Majestic recaptured her in 1814. She was recommissioned and was wrecked on the Bermuda Reefs off Bermuda in 1815 while escorting a convoy.
- HMS Dominica (K507) was a Colony-class frigate of the United Kingdom during World War II, launched in 1943 and scrapped in 1947.
