= HMS Foam =

Five ships of the Royal Navy have borne the name HMS Foam, a figurative term for the sea:

- HMS Foam (1856), a wooden Albacore-class gunboat launched in 1856 and sold for breaking in 1867.
- HMS Foam (1871), a composite Ariel-class gunboat launched in 1871 and sold for breaking in 1887.
- HMS Foam (1896), a Thornycroft two funnel, 30-knot destroyer (classified as a D-class destroyer in 1912) launched in 1896 and sold for breaking in 1914.
- HMS Foam (1919), an Admiralty steel drifter, launched in 1919, sold in 1921, and renamed Starwort.
- HMS Foam (1943), J405 a Lend-Lease Catherine-class minesweeper launched in 1943 and returned to the US Navy in 1946.

See also

- HMS Northern Foam a 655-ton trawler hired in 1939 and returned to her owners in 1945.
