= Earl of Inchiquin (ship) =

History

Great Britain
- Name: Earl of Inchiquin
- Namesake: Baron Inchiquin
- Launched: 1764, Swansea
- Captured: 15 March 1781

General characteristics
- Tons burthen: 130 (bm)
- Armament: 6 guns

Earl of Inchiquin (or Earl of Inchquin) was launched at Swansea in 1764. She sailed between Cork and Swansea and then became a Portsmouth tender. The British Royal Navy hired her in 1776 or earlier. A French privateer captured her in the Channel in 1781.

Missing volumes or missing pages in extant volumes of Lloyd's Register (LR) have resulted in her first appearing in Lloyd's Register in 1776, and in missing information for some subsequent years.

Year	Master	Owner	Trade	Source
1776	G.Irwin	Button & Co.	Cork–Swansea	LR
1778	G.Irwin	Button & Co.	Portsmouth tender	LR
1781	G.Irwin	Button & Co.	Portsmouth tender	LR

The Lieutenant commanding the British tender Earl of Inchiquin seized the snow Dickenson (or Dickinson), William Meston, master, on 7 April 1776 at King Road, off Avonmouth in the Bristol Channel. Dickinson had been on her way to Nantes when Dickinson's crew brought her into Bristol. She carried documents describing all the vessels the American rebels were sending to France.

The French privateer Duc de Chartres captured Earl of Inchquin on 15 March 1781. Earl of Inchquin, of six guns and under the command of Lieutenant William Robertson, was in the Channel when she encountered Duc de Chartres, which gave chase. The French privateers Bougainville (24 or 32 guns), and Tartare (12 guns), joined the chase. Unable to escape, Robertson struck.

Earl of Inchiquin was no longer listed in Lloyd's Register for 1782.
