= HMS Eugenie (1804) =

Sloop of the Royal Navy

History

Great Britain
- Name: Friends
- Builder: Ipswich
- Launched: 1800
- Fate: Sold in 1804

United Kingdom
- Name: HMS Eugenie
- Acquired: in 1804 by purchase
- Fate: Sold in 1810

United Kingdom
- Name: Friends
- Owner: 1810:Stevenson; 1825:Taylor
- Acquired: in 1810 by purchase
- Fate: Last listed in 1830

General characteristics
- Tons burthen: 24126/94 (bm)
- Length: Overall:90 ft 6 in (27.6 m); Keel:73 ft 1 in (22.3 m)
- Beam: 26 ft 6 in (8.1 m)
- Depth of hold: 17 ft 0 in (5.2 m)
- Sail plan: Brig
- Complement: 65
- Armament: Royal Navy:14 × 18-pounder carronades + 2 × 9-pounder chase guns; 1815:10 × 9-pounder carronades

HMS Eugenie was launched at Ipswich in 1800 as the mercantile Friends. She sailed as a West Indiaman between London and Jamaica until the British Royal Navy purchased her in 1804. By 1807 the Navy had withdrawn her from service, and in 1810 it sold her. She then returned to mercantile service having resumed the name Friends. She was last listed in 1830.

== Career ==
Friends appeared in Lloyd's Register in 1801 with T. Read, master, W. Thurlby, owner, and trade London. Thereafter her trade became London–Jamaica. Lloyd's Register carried the same information even after the Royal Navy purchased her.

Royal Navy: The Admiralty purchased Friends in June 1804 and renamed her HMS Eugenie. She underwent fitting in May–June by Tibbott & Co., Thames, and then Woolwich between 15 June and 4 August.

Commander Charles Webb commissioned her in June for convoys and cruising. She made several voyages to the Channel Islands ferrying troops.

Then on 31 January 1805 she sailed from Spithead for the coast of Africa carrying the Scottish explorer Mungo Park. By 25 August 1805 she was at Deal, having come from Africa via Portsmouth. She then sailed on to Sheerness.

By 1807 Eugenie was in ordinary at Sheerness. The "Principal Officers and Commissioners of His Majesty's Navy" offered the "Eugenie sloop" for sale on 22 December 1810. She was sold there on that day.

Friends appeared in Lloyd's Register with new data in 1811. Her master was Stevenson, her owner Sherwood, and her trade London–Honduras.

Year	Master	Owner	Trade	Notes & Source
1815	Stevenson	Sherwood	London–Buenos Aires	Small repairs in 1812; Register of Shipping (RS)
1820	R. Goodland	Sherwood	London–Quebec	RS

Incident: Lloyd's List reported on 6 January 1824 that Friends, Smithson, master, had gone onshore at Holm Sand (in the Thames Estuary), while sailing from Wyborg. She was gotten off and arrived at Hull on 31 December 1823.

Year	Master	Owner	Trade	Notes & Source
1825	Smithson	Sherwood	Hull–America	Damages repaired and "good repair" 1824; RS
1829	White; J. Taylor	Sherwood	Hull–Murmansk	Repairs 1823 and damages repaired 1824; Lloyd's Register
1830	Taylor	Capt. & Co.	Hull–America	"Good repair" 1829; RS

== Fate ==
Friends was last listed in 1830.
