= HMS Euryalus =

Several ships of the Royal Navy have been named HMS Euryalus after Euryalus, one of Argonauts - the mythical band of heroes who accompanied Jason in his search for the Golden Fleece.

- HMS Euryalus (1803), launched 1803, was a frigate. Captained by Henry Blackwood, she was at the Battle of Trafalgar, where she was Collingwood's flagship after the death of Nelson. She was broken up in Gibraltar in 1860.
- HMS Euryalus (1853), launched at Chatham in 1853, was a 2,371-ton wooden screw frigate of 35 guns and crew of 515.
- HMS Euryalus (1877), launched in 1877, was a Bacchante-class iron screw corvette, sold in 1897.
- HMS Euryalus (1901), launched 1901, was a Cressy-class armoured cruiser that fought at the Dardanelles in World War I. She was scrapped in 1920.
- HMS Euryalus (42), launched 1939, was a Dido-class cruiser. In World War II she was damaged at the Second Battle of Sirte in 1942.
- HMS Euryalus (F15), launched 1963, was a Leander-class frigate, scrapped in 1990.
