= HMS Faversham =

Three vessels of the Royal Navy have been named HMS Faversham after Faversham:

- HMS Faversham (1712) was a 40-gun 1706 Establishment frigate launched in 1712. She was broken up at Portsmouth in 1730.
- HMS Faversham (1741) was a 44-gun 1733 Establishment frigate launched in 1741. She was sold in 1749.
- HMS Faversham (1918) was a Hunt-class minesweeper launched in 1918. She was sold in 1927 and broken up at Charlestown in 1928.

== See also ==
HMS Feversham (1696)
