= HMS Exmoor =

Two ships of the Royal Navy have borne the name HMS Exmoor, after the Exmoor fox hunt:

- HMS Exmoor (L61) was a Hunt-class destroyer launched in 1940 and sunk in 1941.
- HMS Exmoor (L08) was a Hunt-class destroyer, planned as HMS Burton, but renamed HMS Exmoor in 1941 after the sinking of the first HMS Exmoor. She was launched in 1941, transferred to the Royal Danish Navy in 1952 as HDMS Valdemar Sejr and sold for breaking up in 1966.
