= HMS Dundee =

A number of ships of the Royal Navy have been named Dundee, after the city in Scotland.

- HMS Dundee (1911), an armed boarding steamer of the First World War
- HMS Dundee (L84), a sloop of the Second World War
