= HMS Dianthus =

Two ships of the Royal Navy have borne the name HMS Dianthus, after the flower:

- HMS Dianthus (1917) was an Anchusa-class sloop launched in 1917 and sold in 1921 becoming the mercantile Guerrero..
- HMS Dianthus (K95) was a Flower-class corvette launched in 1940 and sold in 1947 becoming the mercantile Thorslep.
