= HMS Duguay-Trouin =

Two vessels have served the British Royal Navy as HMS Duguay-Trouin, both captured French privateers named for René Duguay-Trouin:

- HMS Duguay-Trouin was an 18-gun French privateer sloop launched in 1779 at Le Havre. HMS Surprise captured her in 1780 and the British Royal Navy took her into service under her existing name. It sold Duguay Trouin on 30 October 1783. She then became the West Indiaman Christopher, and later a slaver. She was lost at Charleston in September 1804.
- HMS Duguay-Trouin was the schooner that HMS Ferret and Hussar captured on 30 March 1809. This letter of marque was commissioned in April to carry eight guns. She then served in Sir John Borlase Warren's squadron.
