= HMS Donegal =

Three ships of the Royal Navy have been named HMS Donegal, after the failed French attempt to land in County Donegal in 1798:

- HMS Donegal (1798) was a 76-gun third rate, previously the French ship Hoche. She was captured in 1798 and commissioned into the Navy as HMS Donegal. She was broken up in 1845.
- HMS Donegal (1858) was a 101-gun first rate Conqueror-class ship of the line launched in 1858. She became part of the torpedo and mining school ship HMS Vernon in 1886 and was sold in 1925.
- HMS Donegal (1902) was a Monmouth-class armoured cruiser launched in 1902. She served in the First World War and was sold for scrap in 1920.
