= HMS Delft =

Several ships of the Royal Navy have borne the name Delft:

- HMS Delft (1665), captured in 1665 during the Battle of Lowestoft. She was sold in 1668.
- HMS Delft (1797), formerly the Dutch ship Hercules captured in 1797 during the Battle of Camperdown. She was sunk as a breakwater in 1822. Because Delft served in the navy's Egyptian campaign between 8 March 1801 and 2 September, her officers and crew qualified for the clasp "Egypt" to the Naval General Service Medal, which the Admiralty issued in 1847 to all surviving claimants.
