= HMS Fama =

Two ships of the Royal Navy have borne the name HMS Fama:

- HMS Fama (1804) was a 36-gun fifth rate. She was captured from the Spanish in 1804 by HMS Medusa and HMS Lively and sold in 1812.
- HMS Fama (1808) was an 18-gun brig-sloop captured from the Danes in 1808 and wrecked in December.

== See also ==
- HMS Fame
