= HMS Escort =

Four ships of the Royal Navy have borne the name HMS Escort:

- HMS Escort (1757) was a 14-gun sloop, formerly a French privateer. She was captured in 1757 and sold in 1768.
- HMS Escort (1801) was a 12-gun gun-brig launched in 1801 and transferred to Customs in 1815.
- HMS Escort (1856) was an Albacore-class wooden screw gunboat launched in 1856 and broken up in 1865.
- HMS Escort (H66) was an E-class destroyer launched in 1934. She was torpedoed in 1940 and foundered three days later.

See also:

- Escort (1873) was an iron paddle dockyard tug, built by John Laird, Sons & Co., Birkenhead, and wrecked on 20 April 1887 while target towing.
- Escort (1896) was a steel paddle dockyard tug, built by W H Potter, Liverpool and Fawcett, Preston & Co; she was sold to J A White on 31 May 1922 for demolition at St David's, Fife.
- Escort (1897) was a 165 GRT fishing trawler built by Mackie & Thomson, Govan, and purchased in 1915 to serve as a boom defence vessel; she was sold in 1920 and returned to fishing.
