= HMS Dahlia =

Two ships of the Royal Navy have been named HMS Dahlia:

- HMS Dahlia (1915) was an Acacia-class sloop launched in 1915 and sold in 1932
- HMS Dahlia (K59) was a Flower-class corvette, launched in 1940 and sold in 1948
