= HMS Eskimo =

Two ships of the British Royal Navy have been named HMS Eskimo:

- HMS Eskimo (1914) was an armed merchant cruiser, built in 1910 for Wilson Line, commissioned into service in 1914, and returned to mercantile service in 1915.
- HMS Eskimo (F75) was a Tribal-class destroyer that served in World War II.
- HMS Eskimo (F119) was a Tribal-class frigate. She was sunk as a target vessel in 1986.
