= Loch Ettrick =

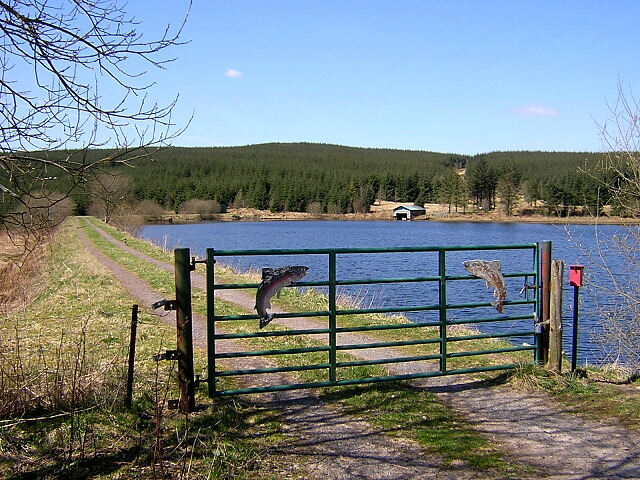

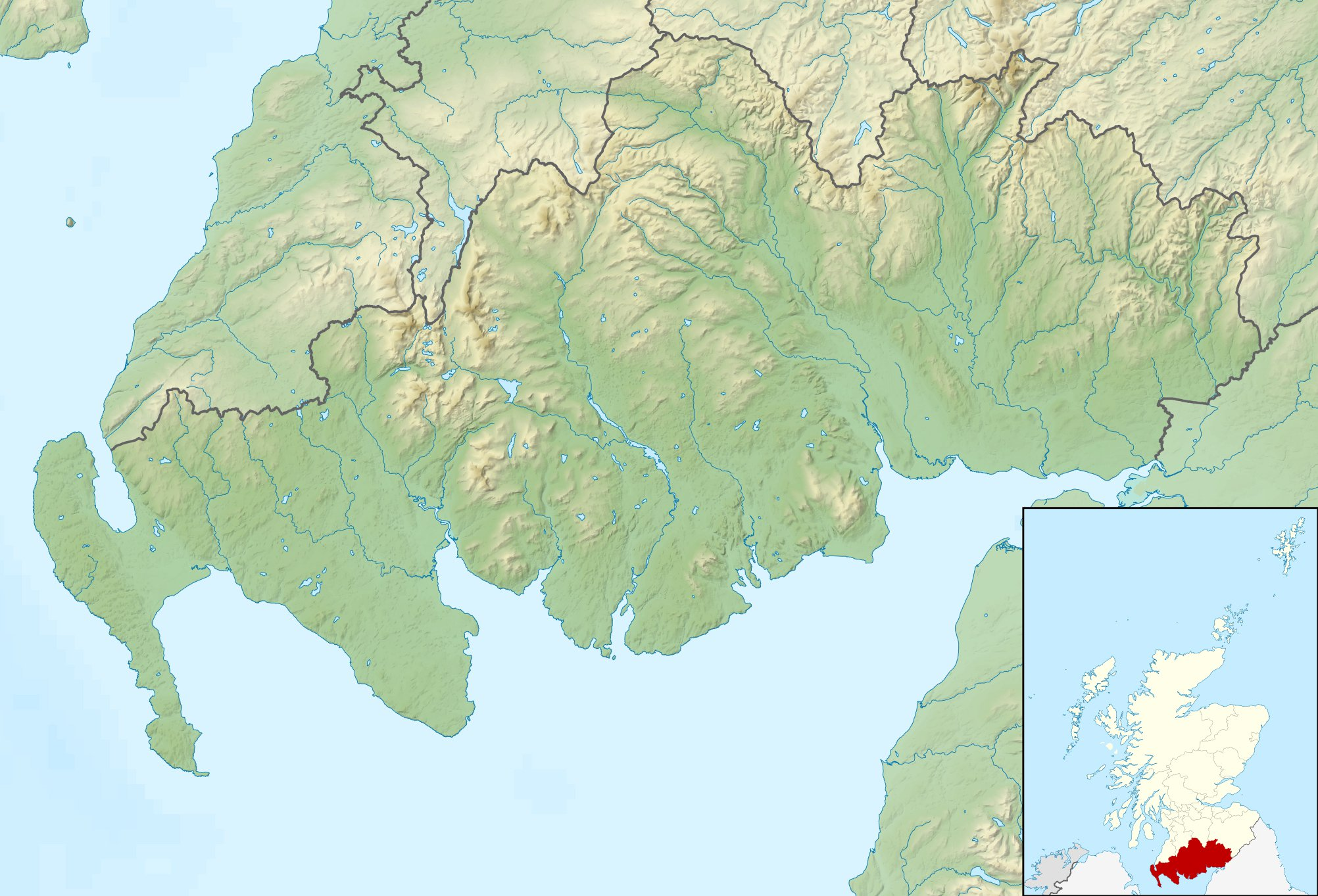
- Location within Dumfries and Galloway
- Location: Dumfries and Galloway, Scotland
- Coordinates: 55°13′35″N 3°39′35″W
- Basin countries: United Kingdom

Loch Ettrick is a body of water near Thornhill and Ae, Dumfries and Galloway, in the Southern Uplands of Scotland.
