= HMS Dulverton =

Two ships of the Royal Navy have been named HMS Dulverton after the Dulverton hunt:

- HMS Dulverton (L63), launched in 1941, was a Type II Hunt-class destroyer. She served in World War II and was scuttled in 1943 after being severely damaged by German air attack.
- HMS Dulverton (M35), launched in 1982, was a Hunt-class mine countermeasures vessel. In 1997 she was converted to serve as a patrol vessel. She was decommissioned in 2004 and in 2008 she was bought by Lithuania, entering service in 2011 as Kuršis.
