= HMS Dover =

Eight ships of the Royal Navy have borne the name HMS Dover, after the English town and seaport of Dover, although the 1654 ship was named after the Battle of Dover (1652):

- English ship Dover (1649) was a pink captured from the Royalists in 1649 and sold in 1650.
- English ship Dover (1654) was a 48-gun ship launched in 1654, rebuilt in 1695 and 1716 and broken up in 1730.
- HMS Dover (1672) was an 8-gun dogger captured from the Dutch in 1672 and given away in 1677.
- HMS Dover (1740) was a 44-gun fifth rate launched in 1740 and sold in 1763.
- HMS Dover (1786) was a 44-gun fifth rate launched in 1786, converted to an armed transport by 1799, and burnt by accident in 1806. Because Dover served in the navy's Egyptian campaign between 8 March 1801 and 2 September, her officers and crew qualified for the clasp "Egypt" to the Naval General Service Medal, which the Admiralty issued in 1847 to all surviving claimants.
- HMS Dover (1798) was a sailing barge of 57 tons (bm), built at Woolwich that the Navy purchased.
- HMS Dover was a 38-gun fifth rate, previously the East Indiaman Carron. The Navy purchased her in 1804, named her HMS Duncan, and renamed her HMS Dover in 1807; she was wrecked in 1811.
- HMS Dover (1811) was a 38-gun troopship, previously the Italian Royal Marine corvette Bellona, launched at Venice in 1808. She was captured in 1811, used for harbour service from 1825, and sold in 1836.
- HMS Dover (1840) was an iron paddle packet launched in 1840. She was the first iron ship in the Royal Navy, and was sold in 1866.

== See also ==
- HM hired armed vessel Dover
- HMS Dover Prize
- HMS Dover Castle was a planned Castle-class corvette, cancelled in 1943.
