= HMS Forester =

Ten ships of the Royal Navy have borne the name HMS Forester:

- English ship Forrester (1657) was a 22-gun ship launched in 1657 and blown up in 1672.
- HMS Forester (1693) was a 7-gun hoy launched in 1693 and wrecked in 1752.
- HMS Forester (1748) was a 4-gun hoy launched in 1748 and transferred to the coastguard as a hulk in 1828.
- HMS Forester (1794) was a 3-gun gunvessel, formerly a Thames sailing barge, purchased in 1794 and sold on 29 December 1801 for £210.
- HMS Forester (1806) was an 18-gun Cruizer-class brig-sloop launched in 1806. She was used for harbour service from 1816 and was sold in 1819.
- HMS Forester was to have been a 10-gun brig. She was ordered in 1824, but the order was either cancelled in 1830, or otherwise transferred to become the next HMS Forester.
- HMS Forester (1832) was a 10-gun Cherokee-class brig-sloop launched in 1832, wrecked in 1833 and sold in 1843.
- HMS Forester (1856) was an Albacore-class wooden screw gunboat launched in 1856. She was renamed YC7 as a yard craft in 1868, and was lost in a typhoon in 1871.
- HMS Forester (1877) was a composite screw gunboat launched in 1877. She became a coal hulk in 1894 and was sold in 1904.
- HMS Forester (1911) was an Acheron-class destroyer launched in 1911 and sold in 1921.
- HMS Forester (H74) was an F-class destroyer launched in 1934. She was sold for scrapping in 1946.
