= HMS Egret =

Two ships of the Royal Navy have borne the name Egret, after the bird, the Egret:

- HMT Egret (1918) was a trawler hired between 1918 and 1919.
- HMS Egret (L75) was an Egret-class sloop launched in 1938 and sunk in 1943.
