= John Essington =

John Essington may refer to:

- John Essington (MP for Aylesbury) (c. 1667–1740)
- John Essington (MP for New Romney) (1689–1729)
