= HMS Decouverte =

Two ships captured from the French have served the British Royal Navy under the name HMS Decouverte.

- HMS Decouverte (1803) was a French navy schooner launched in 1800, captured in 1803, decommissioned in 1806, and sold in 1808.
- HMS Decouverte (1806) was the French schooner Eclipse, launched in 1804, captured in 1806, commissioned as the gun-brig Decouverte, and sold in 1816.
