= HMS Flamborough =

Three vessels of the British Royal Navy have been named HMS Flamborough, after the English town:

- HMS Flamborough (1697) was a 24-gun post ship launched at Chatham Dockyard in 1697 and captured by the French ship Jason near Cape Spartel on 10 October 1705.
- HMS Flamborough (1707) was a 24-gun post ship launched at Woolwich Dockyard on 29 January 1707. It was rebuilt as a 20-gun post ship in 1727 at Portsmouth and sold on 10 January 1748.
- HMS Flamborough (1756) was a 20-gun post ship launched at Limehouse on 14 May 1756 and sold on 23 September 1772.

== See also ==
- HMS Flamborough Head
- HMS Flamborough Prize
- Empire Flamborough, the Empire ship Flamborough
