= HMS Dartmouth =

Six ships and one shore establishment of the Royal Navy have borne the name HMS Dartmouth, after the port of Dartmouth, whilst another two were planned:

- English ship Dartmouth (1655) was a 22-gun ship launched in 1655. She was converted to a fireship in 1688, and rebuilt as a fifth rate in 1689. She was wrecked in the Sound of Mull in 1690.
- HMS Dartmouth (1672) was a 4-gun fireship captured in 1672 and sold in 1674.
- HMS Dartmouth (1693) was a 48-gun fourth rate launched in 1693. She was captured by France in 1695, recaptured in 1702, and renamed HMS Vigo. She was wrecked in 1703.
- HMS Dartmouth (1698) was a 50-gun fourth rate launched in 1698. She was rebuilt in 1741 and sunk in action with the Spanish ship Glorioso in 1747.
- HMS Dartmouth (1746) was to have been a 50-gun fourth rate. She was ordered in 1746, but was cancelled in 1748.
- HMS Dartmouth (1813) was a 36-gun fifth rate launched in 1813. She was used for harbour service from 1831 and was broken up in 1854.
- HMS Dartmouth (1860) was to have been a wood screw frigate. She was laid down in 1860 but was cancelled in 1864.
- HMS Dartmouth (1911) was a Town-class cruiser of the Weymouth subgroup launched in 1911. She served in the First World War and was sold for scrap in 1930.
- HMS Dartmouth (shore establishment) is the name of the Britannia Royal Naval College naval shore establishment

== See also ==
- Dartmouth (disambiguation)
