= HMS Diligent (1813) =

History

United Kingdom
- Name: HMS Diligent
- Acquired: 22 February 1813 by capture
- Fate: Sold 15 December 1814

General characteristics
- Tons burthen: 100, or 105 (bm)
- Sail plan: Lugger
- Complement: 89 (at capture)
- Armament: 6 × 12-pounder carronades + 2 × 6-pounder guns (privateer)
- Notes: Winfield describes Diligente as a cannonière (gunboat) possibly launched at Corfu in 1810, and gives the date of capture as 6 January 1813. However, those details apply to the gunboat Diligente that HMS Bacchante and Weazel had captured between Otranto and Corfu. Demerliac appears to conflate the Dilgente launched at Corfu with the Diligente of Marseilles, the vessel of the present article.

HMS Diligente was the French privateer Diligente that HMS Cephalus captured on 22 February 1813.

Capture: On 22 February 1813 Cephalus, after a nine-hour chase, captured the French privateer lugger Diligente, Bonet, master, in the Mediterranean. Diligente, of Marseilles, was pierced for fourteen guns but only had eight mounted; she threw four of her 12-pounder carronades overboard during the chase. She was 26 days out of Marseilles but had captured nothing. (Note: The letter announcing the capture gives the location of the capture as 38°2′N 7°19′W, but these are clearly incorrect as these put the capture inland, rather than in the Mediterranean.) (Note: Prize money for Diligent's hull and stores was paid in 1817. A first-class share was worth £534 6s 1d; a sixth-class share was worth £13 4s 5d.)

Diligente arrived at Plymouth on 20 August 1814. The "Principal Officers and Commissioners of His Majesty's Navy" offered the "Diligent lugger, of 105 tons", lying at Plymouth, for sale on 15 December. She sold there, on that date, for £200.
