= HMS Demerara =

Two vessels of the British Royal Navy have been named Demerara for Demerara:

- HMS Demerara (1804) was the mercantile schooner Anna that the British Royal Navy purchased in 1804. A French privateer captured her that same year and Demerara became the French privateer Hebe. She had an unsuccessful single-ship action in 1806. The Royal Navy recaptured her and she returned to service that year as HMS Anna. She was broken up in 1809.
- HMS Demerara (1806) was the French privateer Cosmopoli, launched, captured, and purchased in 1806. She spent her entire career in the West Indies. In 1809 she participated in the capture of Martinique. Demerara was sold in 1813.
