= HMS Espoir =

Seven vessels of the British Royal Navy have been named HMS Espoir, after the French word for "hope":

- The first HMS Espoir was a sloop sold on 23 March 1784, origin unknown.
- HMS Espoir (1797) was a French brig-sloop of fourteen 6-pounder guns that Tahlia captured in the Mediterranean. She was sold in September 1804.
- HMS Espoir (1804) was a Cruizer-class brig-sloop launched on 22 September and broken up in April 1821.
- HMS Espoir (1826) was Cherokee-class brig-sloop launched on 9 May, and sold in 1857.
- HMS Espoir (1860) was a Philomel-class gunvessel launched 6 January, and armed with one 68-pounder and four 24-pounder howitzers. In 1869 she was converted to a dredger with the designation YC19. She was broken up in Bermuda in June 1881.
- HMS Espoir (1880) was a Banterer-class gunboat launched on 2 November and armed with two 64-pounder guns and two 20-pounder smoothbores. She was converted to a tug in 1895 and on the sale list in 1903.
- The last HMS Espoir was laid down for the Royal Navy on 23 October 1942 in Seattle as HMS Espoir (BAM-23), a Catherine-class minesweeper. However she was retained by the United States Navy as USS Triumph.

== See also ==
- French ship Espoir
