= Eastbourne, County Durham =

Former village in County Durham, England

Coordinates: 54.5223°N 1.52817°W

Eastbourne
- Location within County Durham
- OS grid reference: NZ306142
- Unitary authority: Darlington
- Ceremonial county: County Durham
- Region: North East
- Country: England
- Sovereign state: United Kingdom
- Post town: DARLINGTON
- Postcode district: DL1
- Dialling code: 01325
- Police: Durham
- Fire: County Durham and Darlington
- Ambulance: North East
- UK Parliament: Darlington

'Eastbourne' is a former village in the borough of Darlington and the ceremonial county of County Durham, England. It is situated immediately to the east of the town centre of Darlington of which it is now an area.
