= HMS Dover Prize =

Two ships of the Royal Navy have borne the name HMS Dover Prize, indicating they were ships taken as prizes by one of the ships named HMS Dover. Both ships in this case were captured by the same HMS Dover.

- HMS Dover Prize (1689) was a hulk captured in 1689 and wrecked that same year.
- HMS Dover Prize (1693) was a 32-gun fifth rate, previously the French ship Legere. She was captured in 1693 and was sold in 1698.
