= HMS Esther =

Two vessels of the Royal Navy have been named HMS Esther:

- HMS Esther (1763) was a 6-gun cutter purchased in 1763 and sold in 1779.
- HMS Esther (1911) was a trawler purchased in 1911 and used as a survey vessel. She was sold in 1919 and later became HMRC Vigilant.
