= HMS Dwarf =

Seven vessels of the Royal Navy have been named Dwarf:

- HMS Dwarf (1810) was a Decoy-class cutter. She participated in the capture of a French privateer, and in operations in the Gironde. After the end of the Napoleonic Wars she captured some smuggling vessels. She was wrecked in March 1824.
- HMS Dwarf (1826) was a cutter launched at Cowes. She performed dockyard service and then was transferred to the Coast Guard She was sold in 1862.
- HMS Dwarf (1843) was an iron screw vessel, the mercantile Mermaid that the Admiralty purchased in 1843. She was the Royal Navy's first screw vessel. She was sold in September 1853.
- HMS Dwarf (1856) was a wood screw Cheerful-class gunboat launched at Blackwall. She was broke up in 1863 at Haslar.
- HMS Dwarf (1867) was a composite screw gunvessel launched at Woolwich in 1867. She was sold at Devonport in 1886.
- HMS Dwarf (1898) was the first Bramble-class gunboat to see service. She was broken up in 1926.
- HMS Dwarf (1936) was launched at Dartmouth as a submarine tender. She was hulked in 1963.
