= HMS Exe =

Three ships of the Royal Navy have borne the name HMS Exe, after the River Exe:

- HMS Exe (1903) was a River-class destroyer launched in 1903 and sold in 1920.
- HMS Exe (1918) was a fishery protection gunboat launched in 1918 as the trawler HMS Thomas Jarvis and renamed Exe in September 1920. She was sold in 1928.
- HMS Exe (K92) was a River-class frigate launched in 1942 and scrapped in 1956.
