= HMS Emulous =

Three vessels of the Royal Navy have borne the name HMS Emulous, meaning "Eager or ambitious to equal or surpass another":

- HMS Emulous (1806) was a Cruizer-class brig-sloop launched in 1806 and wrecked in 1812.
- HMS Emulous (1812) was the American schooner USS Nautilus, which the British captured in 1812; she was sold in 1817.
- HMS Emulous (1819) was a Cherokee-class brig-sloop launched in 1819. In 1823 she became a packet when the Royal Navy took over the Post Office Packet Service. In 1843 she was turned over to the Coast Guard. In 1864 she was renamed WV13. She was sold in 1865 for breaking up.
