= Harold Dainty =

English cricketer

Personal information
- Full name: Harold William Dainty
- Born: 2 June 1892; Rushton, Northamptonshire, England
- Died: 17 April 1961 (aged 68); Kettering, Northamptonshire, England
- Batting: Right-handed
- Bowling: Right-arm fast

Domestic team information
- Years: Team
- 1922: Northamptonshire

Career statistics
Competition	First-class
Matches	3
Runs scored	20
Batting average	6.66
100s/50s	–/–
Top score	8
Balls bowled	78
Wickets	–
Bowling average	–
5 wickets in innings	–
10 wickets in match	–
Best bowling	–
Catches/stumpings	–/–
- Source: Cricinfo, 18 November 2011

Harold William Dainty (2 June 1892 – 17 April 1961) was an English cricketer. Dainty was a right-handed batsman who bowled right-arm fast. He was born at Rushton, Northamptonshire.

Dainty made three first-class appearances for Northamptonshire in the 1922 County Championship against Lancashire, Yorkshire and Essex. In his three first-class matches, he scored 20 runs at an average of 6.66, with a high score of 8. With the ball he bowled a total of thirteen overs, though without taking any wickets.

He died at Kettering, Northamptonshire on 17 April 1961.
