= HMS F1 =

Submarine of the Royal Navy

History

United Kingdom
- Name: HMS F1
- Builder: Chatham Dockyard
- Laid down: 1 December 1913
- Launched: 31 March 1915
- Commissioned: 14 August 1915
- Fate: Broken up, 1920

General characteristics
- Class & type: F-class submarine
- Displacement: 353 long tons (359 t) surfaced; 525 long tons (533 t) submerged
- Length: 151 ft (46.0 m)
- Beam: 16 ft 1.25 in (4.91 m)
- Draught: 10 ft 7 in (3.23 m)
- Propulsion: 2 shaft diesels, 2 electric motors, 900bhp/400shp
- Speed: 14.5 knots (26.9 km/h; 16.7 mph) surfaced; 8.75 knots (16.21 km/h; 10.07 mph) submerged
- Range: 3,000 nmi (5,600 km) at 9 kn (17 km/h; 10 mph)
- Complement: 19
- Armament: 3 × 18 in (45 cm) torpedo tubes (2 bow/1 stern), 6 torpedoes; 1 × 2-pounder deck gun

HMS F1 was a British F-class submarine of the Royal Navy. She was built at Chatham Dockyard, laid down on 1 December 1913 and launched on 31 March 1915.

F1 was broken up in Portsmouth in 1920.
