= HMS Diligent (1776) =

History

Great Britain
- Name: HMS Diligent
- Acquired: 1776 by purchase
- Fate: Wrecked May 1777

General characteristics
- Type: Schooner
- Armament: 6 guns

HMS Diligent was the mercantile schooner Byfield, which the Royal Navy purchased in 1776. She was wrecked in the Bay of Fundy in May 1777.

The Royal Navy commissioned Diligent under the command of Lieutenant Edmund Dod in July 1776. On 18 May 1777 Dod went aboard Scarborough, Captain Andrew Barkley, that Diligent "was beat to pieces upon the Gannet Rock Ledges". Barkley took Diligent's officers and crew aboard Scarborough at noon. A report, in the Independent Chronicle of 19 June 1777, dated Halifax 27 May, stated that Diligent was lost on the Gannet Rocks in the Bay of Fundy, and that the transport brig Berry had carried officers and crew to Annapolis Royal.

Diligent had been leading a convoy on 16 May towards the Bay of Fundy in poor weather. Fog gave way to rain, and visibility was highly limited. No sooner had lookouts sighted breakers than she ran aground. Measures to free her failed. She ended up on her side and her crew spent the night holding on to her upturned hull. Next morning Berry took off her crew; no lives had been lost.
