= HMS Exploit =

HMS Exploit is the name of the following ships of the Royal Navy:

- HMS Exploit (BAM-24), an Auk-class minesweeper, commissioned in the U.S. Navy as USS Vigilance
- HMS Exploit (P167), an Archer-class patrol vessel

== See also ==
- Exploit (disambiguation)
