= HMS Essington =

HMS Essington may refer to more than one British ship of the Royal Navy:

- HMS Essington (BDE-21), a frigate laid down in 1942 in the United States for the Royal Navy which was retained by the United States Navy, in which she was in commission as the destroyer escort USS Harold C. Thomas (DE-21) from 1943 to 1945
- HMS Essington (K353), a frigate in commission from 1943 to 1945
- HMS Essington (M1134), a coastal minesweeper launched in 1954 and transferred to the Malaysian Navy in 1964

See also

- Captain-class frigate
- Ton-class minesweeper
