= HMS E26 =

Submarine of the Royal Navy

History

United Kingdom
- Name: E26
- Ordered: 29 April 1914
- Builder: William Beardmore, Dalmuir
- Laid down: November 1914
- Launched: 11 November 1915
- Commissioned: 3 October 1915
- Fate: Lost, 3 July 1916

General characteristics
- Class & type: E-class submarine
- Displacement: 662 long tons (673 t) surfaced; 807 long tons (820 t) submerged
- Length: 181 ft (55 m)
- Beam: 15 ft (4.6 m)
- Propulsion: 2 × 800 hp (597 kW) diesel; 2 × 420 hp (313 kW) electric; 2 screws
- Speed: 15 knots (28 km/h; 17 mph) surfaced; 10 knots (19 km/h; 12 mph) submerged
- Range: 3,000 nmi (5,600 km) at 10 kn (19 km/h; 12 mph) surfaced; 65 nmi (120 km) at 5 kn (9.3 km/h; 5.8 mph) surfaced
- Complement: 31
- Armament: 5 × 18 inch (450 mm) torpedo tubes (2 bow, 2 beam, 1 stern); 1 × 12-pounder gun

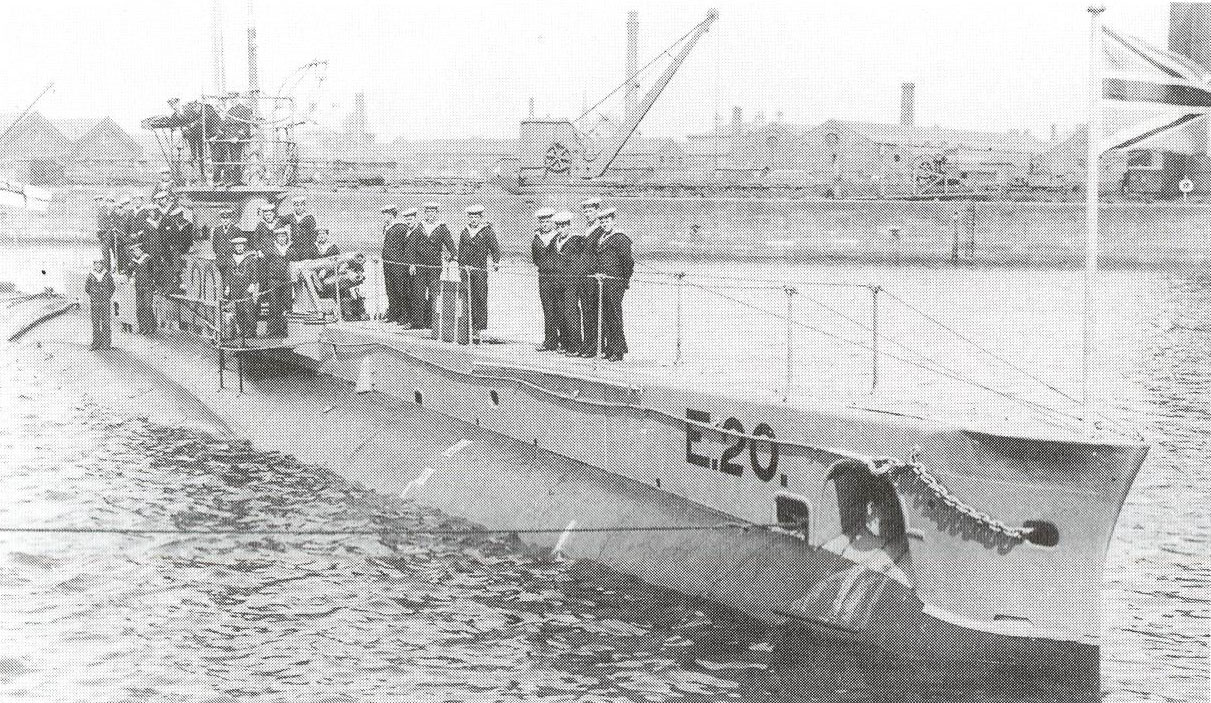
HMS E20 in 1915

HMS E26 was a British E-class submarine built by William Beardmore and Company, Dalmuir. She was, along with the future E25, one of a pair of submarines ordered by the Ottoman Navy on 29 April 1914, but was taken over by the Royal Navy and assigned the E26 name. She was laid down in November 1914, launched on 11 November 1915, and was commissioned on 3 October 1915.

HMS E26 was lost with all hands in the North Sea, probably in the vicinity of the eastern Ems, on or about 3 July 1916. Her wreck has been found by a group of Dutch divers in 2006.

== Design ==
Like all post-E8 British E-class submarines, E26 had a displacement of 662 long tons (673 t) at the surface and 807 long tons (820 t) while submerged. She had a total length of 180 feet (55 m) and a beam of 22 feet 8.5 inches (6.922 m). She was powered by two 800 horsepower (600 kW) Vickers eight-cylinder two-stroke diesel engines and two 420 horsepower (310 kW) electric motors. The submarine had a maximum surface speed of 16 knots (30 km/h; 18 mph) and a submerged speed of 10 knots (19 km/h; 12 mph). British E-class submarines had fuel capacities of 50 long tons (51 t) of diesel and ranges of 3,255 miles (5,238 km; 2,829 nmi) when travelling at 10 knots (19 km/h; 12 mph). E26 was capable of operating submerged for five hours when travelling at 5 knots (9.3 km/h; 5.8 mph).

E26 was armed with a 12-pounder 76 mm (3.0 in) QF gun, mounted forward of the conning tower. She had five 18 inch (450 mm) torpedo tubes, two in the bow, one either side amidships, and one in the stern; a total of 10 torpedoes were carried.

E-Class submarines had wireless systems with 1 kilowatt (1.3 hp) power ratings; in some submarines, these were later upgraded to 3 kilowatts (4.0 hp) systems by removing a midship torpedo tube. Their maximum design depth was 100 feet (30 m) although in service some reached depths of below 200 feet (61 m). Some submarines contained Fessenden oscillator systems.

== Crew ==
Her complement was three officers and 28 men.

== Bibliography ==
- Gardiner, Robert, ed. (1985). Conway's All the World's Fighting Ships 1906–1921. Annapolis, Maryland: Naval Institute Press. pp. 88, 392. ISBN 978-0-87021-907-8. OCLC 12119866.
- Hutchinson, Robert (2001). Jane's Submarines: War Beneath the Waves from 1776 to the Present Say. London: HarperCollins. ISBN 978-0-00-710558-8. OCLC 53783010.
