= HMS Frederick =

Three vessels named Frederick have served the British Royal Navy (RN). In each case, the service was brief.

- Between 1799 and 1801 the Royal Navy deployed a schooner named Frederick in the West Indies. She was under the command of a Lieutenant W. Edwards.
- In 1803 the hired armed cutter Lord Nelson was renamed Frederick for the last few months of her service.
- In 1819 the insurance companies in Malta hired a Gibraltarian brig named Frederick to chase a British pirate, Captain Delano, in William. HMS Spey and Racehorse provided a lieutenant, a midshipman, and 18 seamen to man Frederick. After Frederick captured William, and the pirates, most of whom were later hanged, the RN personnel returned to their vessels.

== See also ==
- HMS Frederick Bush - Castle-class trawler in service from May 1918 to her sale in 1922
- HMS Frederick William was an 86-gun screw-propelled first-rate ship of the line
