= HMS Ettrick =

Four ships of the Royal Navy have borne the name HMS Ettrick after the Scottish river, Ettrick Water.

- HMS Ettrick (1903), a River-class destroyer, launched in 1903. Her bows were blown off when she was torpedoed by German submarine UC-61 in 1917, and she was not repaired. She was sold for breaking in 1919.
- HMS Ettrick was the Mersey-type Admiralty trawler Samuel Jameson, (Note: Colledge has the spellings Samuel Jamieson and Samuel Jameson) launched in 1918 and renamed Ettrick in 1920. She was sold in 1926, renamed Loughrigg and served during World War II as Phyllisia.
- HMS Ettrick was to have been the name of the Flower-class corvette HMS Tamarisk, but she was renamed before her launch in 1941.
- HMS Ettrick (K254), a River-class frigate launched in 1943 and lent to the Royal Canadian Navy between 1944 and 1945. She was broken up in 1953.
