= HMS Eastbourne =

Two ships of the Royal Navy have borne the name HMS Eastbourne, after the East Sussex seaside town of Eastbourne:

- HMS Eastbourne (J127) was a Bangor-class minesweeper launched in 1940 and sold in 1948.
- HMS Eastbourne (F73) was a Whitby-class frigate launched in 1955 and sold for scrapping in 1985.
