= HMS Fisgard =

Three ships and a shore establishment of the Royal Navy have been named HMS Fisgard or HMS Fishguard after the coastal town of Fishguard in Pembrokeshire, Wales, the scene of the defeat of the last invasion attempt on Britain, by a French force in 1797 during the French Revolutionary Wars.

- HMS Fisgard (1797) was a 44-gun fifth-rate frigate (originally named Résistance) captured from the French in 1797 and sold in 1814.
- HMS Fisgard (1819) was a 46-gun fifth-rate frigate built in 1819 and sold in 1879 after serving as a training vessel at Woolwich.
- HMS Fisgard (shore establishment) was the training establishment initiated aboard the second HMS Fisgard. After she was sold in 1879 she was replaced by other vessels:
  - HMS Audacious was Fisgard from 1904 to 1914.
  - HMS Invincible was Fisgard II from 1906 to 1914.
  - HMS Hindustan was Fisgard III from 1905 to 1920.
  - HMS Sultan was Fisgard IV from 1906 to 1931.

The facility moved onshore, but continued to use depot ships until being moved to Chatham in 1931.

- HMS Spartiate was Fisgard from 1915 to 1932.
- HMS Hercules was Fisgard II from 1915 to 1932.
- HMS Terrible was Fisgard III from 1920 to 1932.

The facility moved to Torpoint in 1940 and was established as a command in 1946. It was operational until 1983, when it was merged with HMS Raleigh

- HMS Fishguard (Y59) was a Banff-class sloop, formerly USCGC Tahoe transferred from the US Coast Guard in 1941 and returned in 1946.
