= HMS Eden =

Two ships of the Royal Navy have borne the name HMS Eden:

- HMS Eden (1814) was a 24-gun sixth rate launched in 1814. She was used for experiments between 1816 and 1817, and was broken up in 1833.
- HMS Eden (1903) was a River-class destroyer launched in 1903 and sunk in a collision with SS France in 1916.
