= HMS Duchess of York =

Two vessels that have served the British Royal Navy have borne the name HMS Duchess of York or Dutchess of York, in honour of the Duchess of York:

- Duchess of York was a hired armed cutter that served under contract between 9 March 1795 and 2 January 1799. She was of 54 tons (bm), and was armed with six 4-pounder guns. The ending date of the contract may be incorrect. On 5 March 1799 she captured the French ship Thomas. She may also have been the cutter Duchess of York that together with the cutter Fly brought into Portsmouth in February 1800, the French privateer schooners Dorade and Honfleur.
- HMS Duchess of York was launched at Calcutta in 1801. She served in the expedition to the Red Sea in 1802 and was then sold into mercantile trade. She made some voyages to Port Jackson, New South Wales, and was wrecked in February 1811 off the coast of Madagascar.
