= HMS Dainty =

Four ships of the Royal Navy have borne the name HMS Dainty:

- English ship Dainty (1588), previously named Repentance but renamed in 1589, was a galleon built for the voyage of discovery. She was captured by the Spanish in 1594.
- HMS Dainty (1654) was a four-gun pink in service in 1645.
- HMS Dainty (H53) was a D-class destroyer launched in 1932 and sunk in 1941.
- HMS Dainty (D108) was a Daring-class destroyer launched in 1950 and broken up in 1971.
