= HMS Deptford =

Nine ships of the Royal Navy have been named HMS Deptford, named after Deptford, an area on the south bank of the River Thames in south-east London.:

- HMS Deptford (1652) was a 4-gun sloop launched in 1652 and last listed in 1659.
- HMS Deptford (1665) was a 10-gun ketch launched in 1665 and wrecked in 1689.
- HMS Deptford (1687) was a 50-gun fourth rate launched in 1687, rebuilt in 1700 and 1719, and sold in 1726.
- HMS Deptford (1732) was a 60-gun fourth rate launched in 1732. She was rearmed to 50 guns in 1752 and was sold in 1767.
- HMS Deptford (1735) was a 24-gun storeship launched in 1735 and broken up in 1756.
- HMS Deptford (1781) was a 12-gun tender launched in 1781 and sold in 1863.
- HMS Deptford (1784) was a transport launched in 1784 and presented to the Hibernian Marine Society in 1816.
- HMS Deptford (1788) was a 12-gun transport brig purchased in 1788. She became a mooring lighter and was broken up in 1862.
- HMS Deptford (U53) was a Grimsby-class sloop launched in 1935 and sold in 1948.

== See also ==
- HMS Deptford Prize
- HMS Deptford Transport
