= HMS Dauphin Royal =

HMS Dauphin Royal was a schooner of eight or ten guns that the Royal Navy purchased in 1796 in the West Indies. On 18 October 1796 she and Adventure brought into Môle-Saint-Nicolas a small French privateer schooner, the Capitaine Generoux, of one gun, three swivel guns, and 25 men. Capitaine Generoux, of Santo Domingo, was two days out of Aux Cayes and had captured nothing. When Admiral Duckworth took command of the Leeward Island station in mid-1800, Dauphin Royal was listed among the vessels coming under his command. She was still listed as being on the station in 1801.
