= HMS Flamborough Prize =

Sloop of the Royal Navy

History

Great Britain
- Name: HMS Flamborough Prize
- Acquired: 1757
- Commissioned: 1757
- Fate: Sold 15 March 1763

General characteristics
- Class & type: Sloop-of-war
- Displacement: 115 tons (builder's measure)
- Length: 66 ft (20 m)
- Beam: 20 ft 6 in (6.25 m)
- Propulsion: Sails
- Armament: 14 × 4-pounder cannons

HMS Flamborough Prize was a French privateer originally called Le Général Lally (General Lally). The sloop was captured in action 14 April 1757 by HMS Flamborough and subsequently commissioned into the Royal Navy. The ship was sold 15 March 1763.
