= List of ship launches in 1953 =

The list of ship launches in 1953 includes a chronological list of ships launched in 1953. In cases where no official launching ceremony was held, the date built or completed may be used instead.

Date	Ship	Class	Builder	Location	Country	Notes
17 January	Brigham	Ham-class minesweeper	Berthon Boat Co. Ltd	Lymington	United Kingdom	For Royal Navy.
23 January	Wahkiakum County	Terrebonne Parish-class tank landing ship	Ingalls Shipbuilding	Pascagoula, Mississippi	United States	For United States Navy.
29 January	Harpa	Tanker	Harland & Wolff	Belfast	United Kingdom	For Anglo-Saxon Petroleum Company.
29 January	Waltershof	Type I ferry	Gustav Wolkau	Hamburg	West Germany	For HADAG.
19 February	Fraser	St. Laurent-class destroyer	Burrard Dry Dock	Vancouver	Canada	For Royal Canadian Navy.
February	J.H.C. 701	Barge	Alabama Drydock and Shipbuilding Company	Mobile, Alabama	United States	For J. H. Coppedge Co.
February	L.T.C. No.44	Tank barge	Alabama Drydock and Shipbuilding Company	Mobile, Alabama	United States	For Lake Tankers Corporation.
February	L.T.C. No.45	Tank barge	Alabama Drydock and Shipbuilding Company	Mobile, Alabama	United States	For Lake Tankers Corporation.
4 March	Maid of Argyll	Ferry	Harland & Wolff	Govan	United Kingdom	For British Railways.
5 March	Maid of the Loch	Paddle steamer	Harland & Wolff	Govan	United Kingdom	For British Railways.
2 April	Maid of Skelmorlie	Ferry	Harland & Wolff	Govan	United Kingdom	For British Railways.
11 April	Tioga County	Terrebonne Parish-class tank landing ship	Bath Iron Works	Bath, Maine	United States	For United States Navy.
15 April	Irex	Tanker	Harland & Wolff	Belfast	United Kingdom	For A/S Field.
16 April	Olympia	Ocean liner	Alexander Stephen and Sons	Glasgow	United Kingdom	For Greek Line.
18 April	Westchester County	Terrebonne Parish-class tank landing ship	Christy Shipbuilding	Sturgeon Bay, Wisconsin	United States	For United States Navy.
29 April	Ottawa	St. Laurent-class destroyer	Canadian Vickers	Montreal	Canada	For Royal Canadian Navy.
April	Beardslee No. 24	Barge	Alabama Drydock and Shipbuilding Company	Mobile, Alabama	United States	For Beardslee Launch & Barge.
April	L.C.D. & T. Co. No. 105	Barge	Alabama Drydock and Shipbuilding Company	Mobile, Alabama	United States	For Lake Charles Dredging.
April	L.C.D. & T. Co. No. 106	Barge	Alabama Drydock and Shipbuilding Company	Mobile, Alabama	United States	For Lake Charles Dredging.
10 May	Cristoforo Colombo	Ocean liner	Ansaldo Shipyards	Genoa	Italy	For Italian Line.
12 May	Britta	Tanker	Harland & Wolff	Belfast	United Kingdom	For Arthur H. Mathieson.
14 May	Arcadia	Ocean liner	John Brown & Company	Clydebank	United Kingdom	For P&O.
15 May	Walworth County	Terrebonne Parish-class tank landing ship	Ingalls Shipbuilding	Pascagoula, Mississippi	United States	For United States Navy.
17 May	Waldo County	Terrebonne Parish-class tank landing ship	Ingalls Shipbuilding	Pascagoula, Mississippi	United States	For United States Navy.
11 June	William G. Walkley	Tanker	Blyth Dry Docks & Shipbuilding Co. Ltd	Blyth, Northumberland	United Kingdom	For Ampol Petroleum Ltd.
15 June	Damerham	Ham-class minesweeper	Brooke Marine Ltd.	Lowestoft	United Kingdom	For Royal Navy.
25 June	Salisbury	Salisbury-class frigate	Devonport Dockyard	Devonport	United Kingdom	For Royal Navy.
29 June	Fleetbank	Cargo ship	Harland & Wolff	Belfast	United Kingdom	For Bank Line.
June	Belcher Towing Co. No. 16	Barge	Alabama Drydock and Shipbuilding Company	Mobile, Alabama	United States	For Belcher Towing Co.
June	J.H.C. 712	Barge	Alabama Drydock and Shipbuilding Company	Mobile, Alabama	United States	For J. H. Coppedge Co.
1 July	L 534	Type Mannheim 55 ferry	Schiffs- und Maschinenbau AG Mannheim	Mannheim	West Germany	For Flusspioniere Wiesbaden.
2 July	Tom Green County	Terrebonne Parish-class tank landing ship	Bath Iron Works	Bath, Maine	United States	For United States Navy.
14 July	Washoe County	Terrebonne Parish-class tank landing ship	Ingalls Shipbuilding	Pascagoula, Mississippi	United States	For United States Navy.
15 July	Setter 9	Whaler	Harland & Wolff	Belfast	United Kingdom	For Hector Whaling Ltd.
18 July	Kehrwieder	Ferry			West Germany	For HADAG.
21 July	Wettern	Ferry	Norderwerft	Hamburg	West Germany	For HADAG.
27 July	Bedham	Ham-class minesweeper	J. Bolson & Son Ltd.	Poole	United Kingdom	For Royal Navy.
30 July	Saguenay	St. Laurent-class destroyer	Halifax Shipyards	Halifax	Canada	For Royal Canadian Navy.
1 August	Albacore	Unique research submarine	Portsmouth Naval Shipyard	Kittery, Maine	United States	For United States Navy.
10 August	Rathlin Head	Cargo ship	Harland & Wolff	Belfast	United Kingdom	For Ulster Steamship Co.
22 August	Whitfield County	Terrebonne Parish-class tank landing ship	Christy Shipbuilding	Sturgeon Bay, Wisconsin	United States	For United States Navy.
25 August	Jarena	Tanker	Harland & Wolff	Belfast	United Kingdom	For A/S Kosmos.
August	Pinto	Car float	Alabama Drydock and Shipbuilding Company	Mobile, Alabama	United States	For Alabama, Tennessee and Northern Railroad.
22 September	Port Montreal	Cargo ship	Harland & Wolff	Belfast	United Kingdom	For Port Line.
23 September	Almirante Lobo	Transport	Astilleros de Cádiz	Cádiz	Spain	For Spanish Navy.
24 September	Fritham	Ham-class minesweeper	Brooke Marine Ltd.	Lowestoft	United Kingdom	For Royal Navy.
25 September	Dundas	Blackwood-class frigate	J. Samuel White	Cowes	United Kingdom	For Royal Navy.
3 October	Traverse County	Terrebonne Parish-class tank landing ship	Bath Iron Works	Bath, Maine	United States	For United States Navy.
22 October	Eddyness	Eddy-class tanker	Blyth Dry Docks & Shipbuilding Co. Ltd	Blyth, Northumberland	United Kingdom	For Royal Fleet Auxiliary.
22 October	Tantallon Castle	Cargo ship	Harland & Wolff	Belfast	United Kingdom	For Union-Castle Line.
23 October	Dittesham	Ham-class minesweeper	Fairlie Yacht		United Kingdom	For Royal Navy.
23 October	Jaranda	Tanker	Harland & Wolff	Belfast	United Kingdom	For Anders Jahre A/S.
8 November	Dealey	Dealey-class destroyer escort	Bath Iron Works	Bath, Maine	United States	For United States Navy.
11 November	Elpenor	Cargo ship	Harland & Wolff	Belfast	United Kingdom	For Blue Funnel Line.
19 November	AMS-127	Adjutant-class minesweeper	Hiltebrant Drydock Company	Kingston, New York	United States	For Royal Danish Navy.
24 November	British Engineer	Tanker	Harland & Wolff	Belfast	United Kingdom	For British Tanker Company.
24 November	Broadley	Ley-class minehunter	M. W. Blackmore & Sons Ltd.	Bideford	United Kingdom	For Royal Navy.
25 November	Hardy	Blackwood-class frigate	Yarrow Shipbuilders	Glasgow	United Kingdom	For Royal Navy.
27 November	Kemerton	Ton-class minesweeper	Harland & Wolff	Belfast	United Kingdom	For Royal Navy.
28 November	Wexford County	Terrebonne Parish-class tank landing ship	Christy Shipbuilding	Sturgeon Bay, Wisconsin	United States	For United States Navy.
November	Blue Crest	Hopper barge	Alabama Drydock and Shipbuilding Company	Mobile, Alabama	United States	For Bay of New York Coal Corp.
November	Blue Mountain	Hopper barge	Alabama Drydock and Shipbuilding Company	Mobile, Alabama	United States	For James McWilliams Blue Line.
9 December	British Corporal	Tanker	Harland & Wolff	Belfast	United Kingdom	For British Tanker Company.
22 December	British Gunner	Tanker	Harland & Wolff	Belfast	United Kingdom	For British Tanker Company.
Unknown date	CBC-301	Barge	Alabama Drydock and Shipbuilding Company	Mobile, Alabama	United States	For Canal Barge Co. Inc.
Unknown date	CBC-302	Barge	Alabama Drydock and Shipbuilding Company	Mobile, Alabama	United States	For Canal Barge Co. Inc.
Unknown date	CBC-303	Barge	Alabama Drydock and Shipbuilding Company	Mobile, Alabama	United States	For Canal Barge Co. Inc.
Unknown date	CBC-304	Barge	Alabama Drydock and Shipbuilding Company	Mobile, Alabama	United States	For Canal Barge Co. Inc.
Unknown date	CBC-305	Barge	Alabama Drydock and Shipbuilding Company	Mobile, Alabama	United States	For Canal Barge Co. Inc.
Unknown date	CBC-306	Barge	Alabama Drydock and Shipbuilding Company	Mobile, Alabama	United States	For Canal Barge Co. Inc.
Unknown date	CBC-307	Barge	Alabama Drydock and Shipbuilding Company	Mobile, Alabama	United States	For Canal Barge Co. Inc.
Unknown date	CBC-308	Barge	Alabama Drydock and Shipbuilding Company	Mobile, Alabama	United States	For Canal Barge Co. Inc.
Unknown date	CBC-309	Barge	Alabama Drydock and Shipbuilding Company	Mobile, Alabama	United States	For Canal Barge Co. Inc.
Unknown date	CBC-310	Barge	Alabama Drydock and Shipbuilding Company	Mobile, Alabama	United States	For Canal Barge Co. Inc.
Unknown date	Dorothy Jean No. 81	Barge	Alabama Drydock and Shipbuilding Company	Mobile, Alabama	United States	For James Marine Equipment.
Unknown date	Elizabeth Holt	Cargo ship	Cammell Laird & Co. Ltd.	Birkenhead	United Kingdom	For John Holt & Co (Liverpool) Ltd.
Unknown date	Ernesta	Ferry	J. Bolson & Son Ltd.	Poole	United Kingdom	For private owner.
Unknown date	F.S.C. 141	Barge	Alabama Drydock and Shipbuilding Company	Mobile, Alabama	United States	For Frederick Snare Corporation.
Unknown date	Florence Holt	Cargo ship	Cammell Laird & Co. Ltd.	Birkenhead	United Kingdom	For John Holt & Co (Liverpool) Ltd.
Unknown date	G.T.C.-5	Tank barge	Alabama Drydock and Shipbuilding Company	Mobile, Alabama	United States	For Greenville Towing Co.
Unknown date	Harlandic II	Launch	Harland & Wolff	Belfast	United Kingdom	For Harland & Wolff.
Unknown date	J.H.C. 702	Barge	Alabama Drydock and Shipbuilding Company	Mobile, Alabama	United States	For J. H. Coppedge Co.
Unknown date	J.H.C. 703	Barge	Alabama Drydock and Shipbuilding Company	Mobile, Alabama	United States	For J. H. Coppedge Co.
Unknown date	J.H.C. 704	Barge	Alabama Drydock and Shipbuilding Company	Mobile, Alabama	United States	For J. H. Coppedge Co.
Unknown date	J.H.C. 705	Barge	Alabama Drydock and Shipbuilding Company	Mobile, Alabama	United States	For J. H. Coppedge Co.
Unknown date	J.H.C. 706	Barge	Alabama Drydock and Shipbuilding Company	Mobile, Alabama	United States	For J. H. Coppedge Co.
Unknown date	J.H.C. 707	Barge	Alabama Drydock and Shipbuilding Company	Mobile, Alabama	United States	For J. H. Coppedge Co.
Unknown date	J.H.C. 708	Barge	Alabama Drydock and Shipbuilding Company	Mobile, Alabama	United States	For J. H. Coppedge Co.
Unknown date	J.H.C. 709	Barge	Alabama Drydock and Shipbuilding Company	Mobile, Alabama	United States	For J. H. Coppedge Co.
Unknown date	J.H.C. 710	Barge	Alabama Drydock and Shipbuilding Company	Mobile, Alabama	United States	For J. H. Coppedge Co.
Unknown date	J.H.C. 711	Barge	Alabama Drydock and Shipbuilding Company	Mobile, Alabama	United States	For J. H. Coppedge Co.
Unknown date	J.H.C. 713	Barge	Alabama Drydock and Shipbuilding Company	Mobile, Alabama	United States	For J. H. Coppedge Co.
Unknown date	J.H.C. 714	Barge	Alabama Drydock and Shipbuilding Company	Mobile, Alabama	United States	For J. H. Coppedge Co.
Unknown date	J.H.C. 715	Barge	Alabama Drydock and Shipbuilding Company	Mobile, Alabama	United States	For J. H. Coppedge Co.
Unknown date	J.H.C. 716	Barge	Alabama Drydock and Shipbuilding Company	Mobile, Alabama	United States	For J. H. Coppedge Co.
Unknown date	J.H.C. 717	Barge	Alabama Drydock and Shipbuilding Company	Mobile, Alabama	United States	For J. H. Coppedge Co.
Unknown date	Lazio	Cargo ship	Cantieri Navali Riuniti	Trieste	Italy	For Tirrenia di Navigazione SpA .
Unknown date	Pachat	Launch	J. Bolson & Son Ltd.	Poole	United Kingdom	For Anglo-Saxon Petroleum Co. Ltd.
Unknown date	Sambo D. No. 82	Barge	Alabama Drydock and Shipbuilding Company	Mobile, Alabama	United States	For Glenn E. Daulton Co.
Unknown date	12 unnamed vessels	Barges	Alabama Drydock and Shipbuilding Company	Mobile, Alabama	United States	For J. E. Jumonville.
