= HMS Mersham =

Minesweeper of the Royal Navy

History

United Kingdom
- Name: HMS Mersham
- Namesake: Mersham
- Builder: P.K. Harris
- Launched: 5 April 1954
- Completed: 14 January 1955
- Fate: Transferred to France, 1955

France
- Name: Violette
- Acquired: 1955
- Stricken: 1987

General characteristics
- Class & type: Ham-class minesweeper
- Displacement: 120 tons standard; 164 tons full
- Length: 106 ft 6 in (32.46 m)
- Beam: 22 ft (6.7 m)
- Draught: 5 ft 9 in (1.75 m)
- Propulsion: 2 shaft Paxman 12YHAXM diesels, 1,100 bhp (820 kW)
- Speed: 14 knots (26 km/h)
- Complement: 2 officers, 13 ratings
- Armament: 1 × Bofors 40 mm L/60 gun / 20 mm Oerlikon gun
- Notes: Pennant number(s): M2709 / IMS46

HMS Mersham was a Ham-class minesweeper of the Royal Navy. All ships of the class were named after villages ending in -ham. The minesweeper was named after Mersham in Kent. Constructed at Appledore, in Devon, Mersham was launched in April 1954 and completed in January 1955. In April 1955, the ship was transferred to the French Navy and in French service, was known by its pennant number, M773, until it was renamed Violette in 1964. Throughout the 1950s and early 1960s, the vessel undertook minesweeping duties from Brest in Brittany, before being laid up in 1965. In 1974, the ship was transferred to the Gendarmerie and undertook patrol duties until finally being decommissioned in 1987.

== Design and description ==
In the early 1950s, the Royal Navy had a requirement for large numbers of minesweepers to counter the threat to British shipping from Soviet mines in the event of a conventional Third World War. The navy's existing minesweepers were obsolete, while the increasing sophistication of modern mines meant the mine warfare forces could not be supplemented by requisitioned fishing vessels as had been done in previous wars. Large orders were placed for coastal minesweepers (the Ton) and for smaller inshore minesweepers and minehunters intended to operate in inshore waters such as river estuaries (the Ham and Ley classes). As the navy did not have sufficient manpower to operate all the required ships in peacetime, it was planned to lay a large number up in reserve, so they could be manned by reservists (in many cases the crews of the fishing boats which would previously have been used in the same role) in time of emergency. Additional ships were ordered by the United States for supply under the Mutual Defense Assistance Pact (MDAP), with 15 Ham-class minesweepers being allocated to France.

== Construction and service ==
Mersham was launched at the P. K. Harris yard at Appledore, Devon on 5 April 1954 and was completed on 14 January 1955. She was transferred to the French Navy on 4 April 1955, being initially only known by her pennant number M773, but was given the name Violette on 22 February 1964.

On entering service, M773 joined the 26th Minesweeper Division based at Brest in Brittany. The minesweepers of the 26th Division were employed on clearing wartime mines, together with normal training operations. In 1958, M773, together with sister ships M772 (later named Armoise) and M789 (later named Pétunia) visited Douala in Cameroon. On 1 March 1965, Violette was laid up in reserve at Cherbourg.

In the 1970s, all of the French Navy's Ham-class minesweepers were transferred to subsidiary duties as tenders or patrol boats, with five vessels transferred to the Maritime Gendarmerie, the seagoing branch of the National Gendarmerie police force. Violette was transferred to the Gendarmerie on 27 March 1974. Violette remained in use as a patrol boat at La Pallice in 1985, but was now obsolete even in the patrol role, and was decommissioned and stricken on 13 February 1987.
