= HMS Bassingham =

Minesweeper of the Royal Navy

History

United Kingdom
- Name: HMS Bassingham
- Namesake: Bassingham
- Builder: Vosper & Company
- Launched: 24 June 1952
- Completed: 1 October 1953
- Identification: Pennant number(s): M2605 / IMS05
- Fate: Sold 1966. Broken up in September–October 1980.

General characteristics
- Class & type: Ham-class minesweeper
- Displacement: 120 long tons (122 t) standard; 164 long tons (167 t) full load
- Length: 100 ft (30 m) p/p; 106 ft 6 in (32.46 m) o/a
- Beam: 21 ft 4 in (6.50 m)
- Draught: 5 ft 6 in (1.68 m)
- Propulsion: 2 shaft Paxman 12YHAXM diesels; 1,100 bhp (820 kW)
- Speed: 14 knots (16 mph; 26 km/h)
- Complement: 2 officers, 13 ratings
- Armament: 1 × Bofors 40 mm L/60 gun or Oerlikon 20 mm cannon

HMS Bassingham was one of 93 ships of the Ham class of inshore minesweepers, of which HMS Inglesham was the first. Their names were all chosen from villages ending in -ham. The minesweeper was named after Bassingham in Lincolnshire. She was built by Vospers Ltd. of Portsmouth, which later became Vosper-Thorneycroft and was commissioned in October 1953. She displaced 164 tons fully laden and was armed with one 40 mm Bofors gun.

The engines of this class were Paxman diesels, some of which were built under licence by Ruston and Hornsby of Lincoln. The class was designed to operate in the shallow water of rivers and estuaries. She was 32.5 metres (106 ft 8 in) long overall by 6.4 metres (21 ft 0 in) beam. Jane's and the Bassingham website are not consistent about the building material. Jane's says the Ham class, numbered in the 2601 series was of wood. According to the web site, Bassingham was of composite wood and "non-metallic material" construction but Jane's 1953 says that the composite vessels were numbered in the 2001 series and named after places ending in -ley (Ley class). It seems likely that policy changed after Jane's 1953-4 was published.

== Service history ==
Initially based at Plymouth, in December 1954 she joined the 232nd Minesweeping Squadron of the Inshore Flotilla based at Harwich, Essex. In 1956 Bassingham sailed to the Mediterranean Sea to take part in operations in Egypt during the Suez Crisis. Subsequently, she was transferred to the Royal East African Navy, based in Mombasa, Kenya. After two years, she returned to Royal Navy service.

She was eventually sold to Pounds shipbreaking yard in Portsmouth in 1966, remaining there for the next 14 years, being used to provide spare parts for other ships of her class until she was broken up in late 1980.
