= Tresham =

Tresham may refer to:

- Tresham, Gloucestershire, a village in Gloucestershire, England
- Tresham (surname)
- Tresham College of Further and Higher Education, a college in Northamptonshire, England
- Tresham Games, a board games publisher
- HMS Tresham (M2736), a Royal Navy minesweeper
