= HMS Waterwitch =

HMS Waterwitch has been the name of several Royal Navy vessels:

- HMS Waterwitch (1834), a brig-sloop purchased in 1834 and sold in 1861; Joseph White of Cowes built the brig in 1832 for Lord Belfast.
- HMS Waterwitch (1866), an iron hydraulic gunboat launched in 1866 and sold in 1890
- HMS Waterwitch (1892), a hydrographic survey vessel originally called Lancashire Witch and purchased in 1893 and sunk in 1912 after being accidentally rammed by a launch belonging to the governor of Singapore.
- HMS Waterwitch (1915), a despatch vessel launched on 17 October 1914 at the Fairfield Shipyard in Glasgow. Originally ordered by the Turkish Government as Rechid Pasha the vessel was purchased by the Royal Navy on completion in 1915. She served at Gallipoli ferrying soldiers, then at Salonika 1916-17 and Istanbul 1918–19. She was returned to Turkey in 1923, her UK registry closed in 1924 and served as a Bosphorus ferry until about 1983. She was then converted into a luxury motor yacht, her steam engines being replaced by twin diesels. She is still in service today as Halas 71 at Istanbul and Fethiye.
- HMS Waterwitch (J304), an Algerine-class minesweeper launched on 22 April 1943 by Lobnitz & Co at Renfrew; broken up in 1970
- Waterwitch, renamed from HMS Powderham, a Ham-class minesweeper in 1964

== See also ==
- HMS Witch (D89), a British destroyer in commission in the Royal Navy during the mid-1920s and from 1939 to 1945
