= Tibenham =

Tibenham may refer to:

- Tibenham, Norfolk, a village
- RAF Tibenham, a Second World War airfield
- HMS Tibenham, a Ham class minesweeper
