= HMS Bodenham =

Minesweeper of the Royal Navy

History

United Kingdom
- Name: HMS Bodenham
- Namesake: Bodenham
- Builder: Brooke Marine
- Launched: 21 August 1952
- Completed: 23 September 1953
- Fate: transferred to South Yemen 1967

South Yemen
- Name: Al Saqr
- Acquired: 1967
- Stricken: 1984

General characteristics
- Class & type: Ham-class minesweeper
- Displacement: 120 long tons (122 t) standard; 164 long tons (167 t) full load
- Length: 100 ft (30 m) p/p; 106 ft 6 in (32.46 m) o/a
- Beam: 21 ft 4 in (6.50 m)
- Draught: 5 ft 6 in (1.68 m)
- Propulsion: 2 shaft Paxman 12YHAXM diesels; 1,100 bhp (820 kW)
- Speed: 14 knots (16 mph; 26 km/h)
- Complement: 2 officers, 13 ratings
- Armament: 1 × Bofors 40 mm L/60 gun or Oerlikon 20 mm cannon
- Notes: Pennant number(s): M2609 / IMS09

HMS Bodenham was one of 93 ships of the Ham-class of inshore minesweepers. Completed in 1953 for use in the British Royal Navy, she served as a tender to HMS Vernon between 1954 and 1955 before being placed in reserve. In 1967 she was transferred to the newly-independent country of South Yemen renamed Al Saqr. She was renamed Jihla in 1975 and discarded in 1984.

== Construction and design ==
HMS Bodenham (originally planned to be named Green Chaffinch) was ordered from Brooke Marine of Lowestoft on 29 September 1950 as part of the first series of Ham-class inshore minesweepers. The ships of the first series of the Ham class were 100 feet (30.5 m) long between perpendiculars and 106 feet 5 inches (32.44 m) overall, with a beam of 21 feet 2 inches (6.45 m) and draught of 5 feet 6 inches (1.68 m). They had hulls of composite wood-and-aluminium construction and displaced 120 long tons (120 t) standard and 159 long tons (162 t) deep load. They were propelled by two Paxman diesel engines, with a total of 1,100 brake horsepower (820 kW), giving a speed of 14 knots (26 km/h; 16 mph). 15 tons of oil were carried, giving an endurance of 2,350 nautical miles (4,350 km; 2,700 mi) at 9 knots (17 km/h; 10 mph). Armament consisted of a single Bofors 40 mm L/60 gun or Oerlikon 20 mm cannon, although the ships armed with Bofors guns were usually rearmed with Oerlikons. The ships had a complement of two officers and 13 ratings.

Bodenham was launched on 21 August 1952, and was completed on 23 September 1953.

== Service ==
The Ham class were too small to carry modern minesweeping equipment and in particular, lacked the electrical generating capacity to power acoustic and magnetic sweep gear, so saw little active use with the Royal Navy. Bodenham served as tender to HMS Vernon between 1954 and 1955, then going into operational reserve at Rosneath, which lasted until 1963. In 1967, South Yemen became independent from the United Kingdom, and three Ham-class minesweepers (Bodenham, Blunham and Elsenham) were transferred to the newly established nation's navy. Bodenham was renamed Al Saqr on transfer and Jihla in 1975, and was discarded in 1984.
