= HMS Portisham =

Minesweeper of the Royal Navy

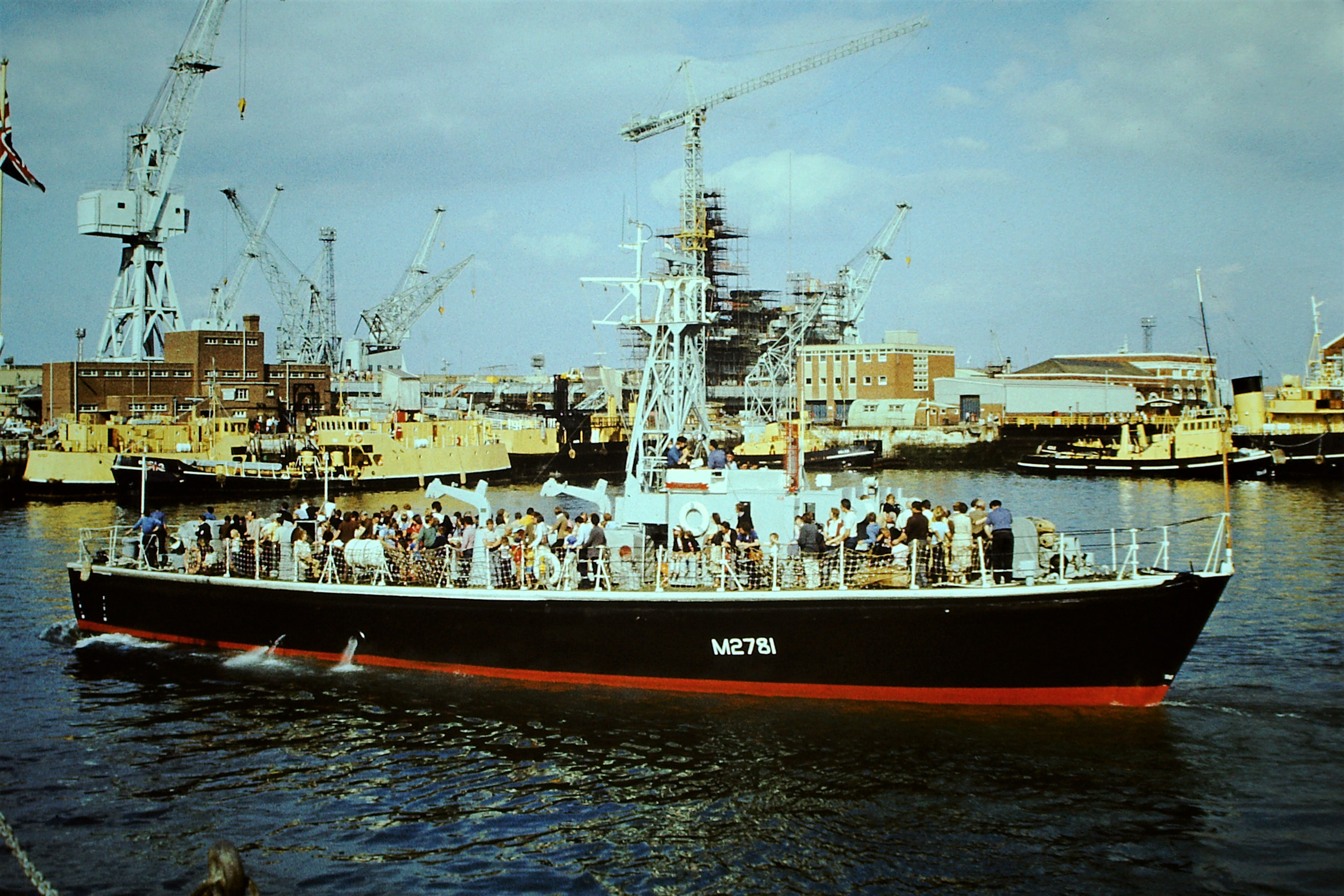
- HMS Portisham at Portsmouth Navy Day, 1980.

History

United Kingdom
- Name: HMS Portisham
- Namesake: Portisham
- Builder: Dorset Yacht Co.
- Launched: 3 November 1955
- Completed: 26 March 1956
- Home port: Balbriggan
- Identification: Pennant number(s): M2781 / IMS81
- Fate: Sold January 1989, currently in private ownership.

General characteristics
- Class & type: Ham-class minesweeper
- Displacement: 120 tons sd
- Length: 100ft (LWL); 106.5ft (LOA)
- Beam: 21.5ft
- Propulsion: Originally, Paxman 12YHAXM, now Scania DS9 & Cummins L10
- Speed: 14 kts
- Range: TBD
- Complement: 2 - 6

HMS Portisham was one of 93 ships of the Ham-class of inshore minesweepers.

Their names were all chosen from villages ending in -ham. The minesweeper was named after Portesham in Dorset, using an alternative spelling for the village.

Portisham served in the Royal Navy from 1956 until 1964, when she was transferred to the Royal Naval Auxiliary Service (RNXS).

On 15 April 1973, Portisham assisted a Royal Dutch Navy Breguet Atlantic aircraft no 257 which ditched off Wassenaar, Netherlands.

Portisham was removed from service in 1983. After her sale in 1989 she was laid up and for sale in a boatyard in Essex. She was procured for conversion to a liveaboard ship by an Irish national in 2007 and is currently the second biggest private vessel under the Irish flag.

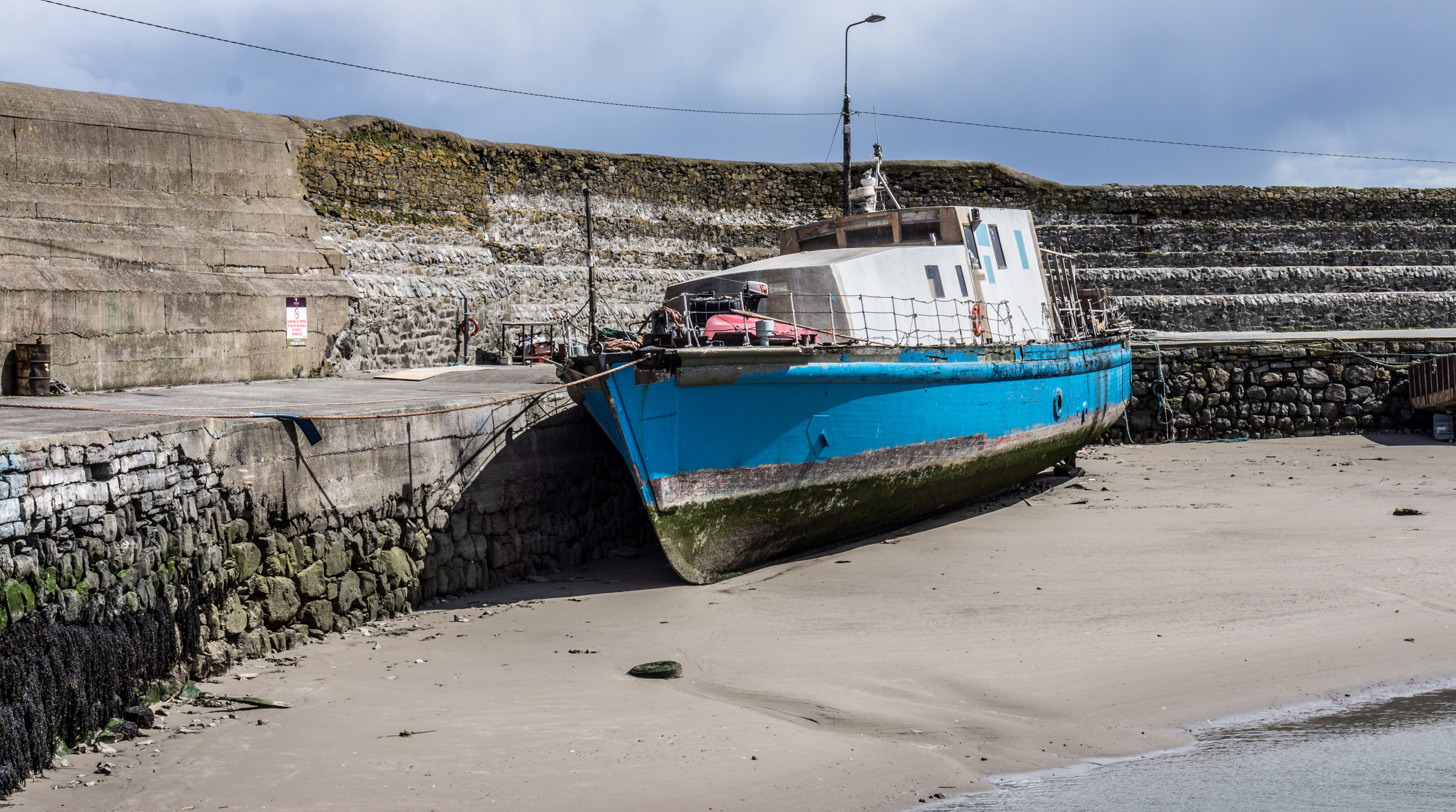
Portisham as a liveaboard in Balbriggan, 2012.
