= Puttenham =

Puttenham may refer to:

- Puttenham, Hertfordshire, England
- Puttenham, Surrey, England
- George Puttenham (1529–1590), English literary critic
- HMS Puttenham, a 1956 Ham class minesweeper

== See also ==
- Puttenham Common
