= HMS Elsenham =

Minesweeper of the Royal Navy

History

United Kingdom
- Name: HMS Elsenham
- Namesake: Elsenham
- Builder: Ailsa Shipbuilding Company
- Launched: 25 May 1955
- Completed: 11 January 1956
- Identification: Pennant number(s): M2624 / IMS26
- Fate: Sold to the Federation of South Arabia 1967. Stricken 1984.

General characteristics
- Class & type: Ham-class minesweeper
- Displacement: 120 long tons (122 t) standard; 164 long tons (167 t) full load
- Length: 100 ft (30 m) p/p; 106 ft 6 in (32.46 m) o/a
- Beam: 21 ft 4 in (6.50 m)
- Draught: 5 ft 6 in (1.68 m)
- Propulsion: 2 shaft Paxman 12YHAXM diesels; 1,100 bhp (820 kW)
- Speed: 14 knots (26 km/h; 16 mph)
- Complement: 2 officers, 13 ratings
- Armament: 1 × Bofors 40 mm L/60 gun or Oerlikon 20 mm cannon

HMS Elsenham was one of 93 ships of the Ham class of inshore minesweepers.

Their names were all chosen from villages ending in -ham. The minesweeper was named after Elsenham in Essex. Some others include HMS Mickleham, and HMS Petersham.
