= Royal East African Navy =

- Active: 1953 – June 1962
- Country: British East Africa: Kenya; Tanganyika; Uganda; Zanzibar
- Branch: Navy
- Garrison/HQ: Mombasa, Kenya

The Royal East African Navy was a unified naval force of the former British colonies of Kenya, Tanganyika, Uganda, and Zanzibar. It was the colonial forerunner of the Kenyan Navy and Tanzanian Navy. Formed in 1953, it was disbanded on 30 June 1962.

== History ==
The Royal East African Navy (REAN) had its origins in the Kenyan Royal Naval Volunteer Reserve (RNVR), which after the end of World War II in 1945 operated a small naval force in the waters of East Africa. In 1950, the Kenyan RNVR was replaced by the East African Naval Force, which received contributions from both Kenya and Tanganyika, and later Uganda and Zanzibar as well. The East African Naval Force in turn became the REAN in 1953. It replaced the Tanganyikan RNVR (established in 1939) and Sultanate of Zanzibar′s RNVR (established in 1938) as well as that of Kenya.

The REAN's headquarters was at the present site (c2007) of Bandari College in Mombasa.

The REAN was administered by the East Africa High Commission (composed of the colonial governors of Tanganyika, Uganda, and Kenya) and was responsible to the Royal Navy's Flag Officer, Arabian Seas and Persian Gulf for operational duties. The REAN headquarters was in Kilindini, Mombasa, Kenya, and headed by a resident officer from the Royal Navy. Several Royal Navy ships were transferred to the REAN and identified as His/Her Majesty's East African Ship (HMEAS).

Initially, the REAN was a 200-member force. It conducted training and performed useful work in famine relief operations.

In June 1958 the Ham-class minesweeper HMS Bassingham was collected by a REAN delivery crew and renamed HMEAS Bassingham.

In 1961 The Statesman's Yearbook wrote that the REAN had a complement of eight officers, eight chief petty officers, and 200 ratings.

After Tanganyika became independent on 9 December 1961, its government decided that the REAN was unsuitable in its existing form. With Tanganyika withdrawing, the governments of Kenya, Uganda, and Zanzibar could not afford the cost of modernizing it.

In December 1961, it was announced that the REAN would disband in 1962. "At noon on 30 June 1962, the White Ensign was lowered from the masthead in front of Navy House, Telegraph Point, Liwatoni, Kilindini, and the REAN was disbanded." Its assets were handed over to the East African Railways and Harbours Corporation; the Naval Base was handed over to the [Mombasa] Harbour Authority. The Royal Navy had an armament depot at the present site of the Kenya Navy (Mtongwe, opposite the Mombasa–Nairobi Standard Gauge Railway freight terminus) which served the logistic requirements of the UK forces in the Middle East. The REAN's former ships were discarded or sold.

== Ships ==
- HMEAS Bassingham - formerly HMS Bassingham, a Ham-class inshore minesweeper acquired from the Royal Navy in June 1958 to replace HMEAS Roslaind but deemed unsuitable for the REAN, and returned to the Royal Navy in October 1961.
- HMEAS Mvita - a 70-foot (21 m) motor fishing vessel. Fate unknown.
- HMEAS Rosalind - formerly HMT Rosalind, a Shakespearian-class naval trawler sold to Kenya in 1946 and discarded in 1963.

== Successor navies ==
- Kenya Navy (1964–): 21-vessel fleet (patrol boats, missile boats, rigid inflatable boats, etc.).
- Tanzania People's Defence Force (1964–) - Following the 1964 merger of Tanganyika and Zanzibar, a small naval force was established with patrol boats and fast attack craft. Current fleet of seven fast attack craft and 12 patrol boats.
