= HMS Shrivenham =

Minesweeper of the Royal Navy

History

United Kingdom
- Name: HMS Shrivenham
- Namesake: Shrivenham
- Builder: J. Bolson, Poole
- Launched: 28 March 1956
- Completed: 11 August 1956
- Fate: Sold February 1969

General characteristics
- Class & type: Ham-class minesweeper
- Notes: Pennant number(s): M2728 / IMS65

HMS Shrivenham was one of 93 ships of the Ham-class of inshore minesweepers.

Their names were all chosen from villages ending in -ham. The minesweeper was named after Shrivenham in Oxfordshire.

Following completion she was immediately placed in Operational Reserve out of the water on a cradle until 1963. She was then transferred to the Royal Navy Auxiliary Service but was put up for disposal in 1966. She was sold to the Port of London Authority in 1969 and remained with them until her retirement in the 1980s.

Although retired and with the wheelhouse, engines and most deck fittings removed she is still "afloat" and has, for the last 22 years, been a "liveaboard" home. Renovations continue with the addition of a new topside cabin.
