= Sparham =

Village in Norfolk, England

Coordinates: 52.73457°N 1.06688°E

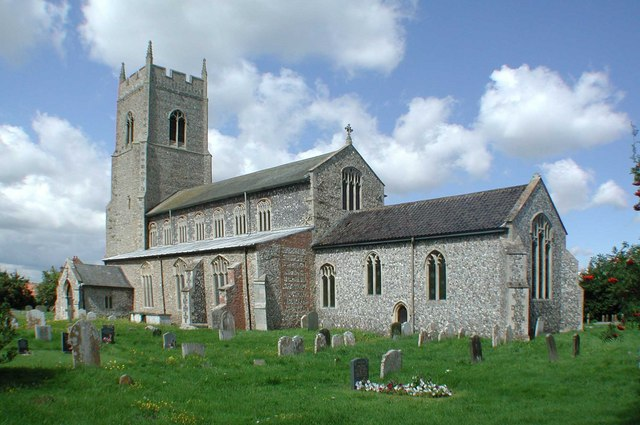
- St Mary's Church

- Location within Norfolk
- Area: 7.22 km^{2} (2.79 sq mi)
- Population: 341 (2011)
  - Density: 47/km^{2} (120/sq mi)
- OS grid reference: TG071196
- Civil parish: Sparham
- District: Breckland
- Shire county: Norfolk
- Region: East
- Country: England
- Sovereign state: United Kingdom
- Post town: NORWICH
- Postcode district: NR9
- Police: Norfolk
- Fire: Norfolk
- Ambulance: East of England

Sparham is a village and civil parish in Norfolk, England. It covers an area of 7.22 km^{2} (2.79 sq mi) and had a population of 291 in 109 households at the 2001 census, including Bylaugh and increasing to a population of 341 in 143 households at the 2011 census. For the purposes of local government, it falls within the Upper Wensum Ward of Breckland District Council and the Elmham and Mattishall Division of Norfolk County Council.

The villages name means 'spar homestead/village' or 'spar hemmed-in land'.

Sparham is one of the highest points in Norfolk, and the top of the church tower has views of the surrounding countryside for several miles.

The hamlet of Sparhamhill lies to its east and south on the main A1067 road.

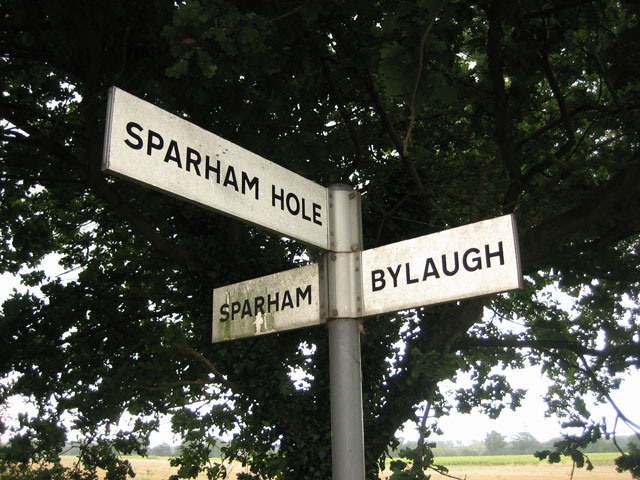
As well as Sparham and Sparhamhill there are also Sparham Hole and Sparham Hall

== Notes ==
http://kepn.nottingham.ac.uk/map/place/Norfolk/Sparham

== See also ==
Media related to Sparham at Wikimedia Commons

- HMS Sparham, a Ham-class minesweeper
