= Pulham (disambiguation) =

Pulham is a village in Dorset, England.

Pulham may also refer to:

== Places in England ==
- Pulham, Dorset
- Pulham Market, Norfolk
- Pulham St Mary, Norfolk
- RNAS Pulham Airship station, Norfolk

== Companies ==
- James Pulham and Son, landscape gardeners and terracotta manufacturers
- Pulham & Sons (Coaches) Limited, a Cotswold family-run bus and coach company founded in 1880.
