= Popham =

Popham may refer to:

== Places ==
- Popham, Devon, a location in England
- Popham, Hampshire, a small hamlet in the southern United Kingdom
- The Popham Colony, a short-lived English colonial settlement in North America
- Fort Popham, a coastal defense land battery at the mouth of the Kennebec River in Phippsburg, Maine, in the United States

== Ships ==
- HMS Popham (M2782), a minesweeper of the British Royal Navy
- USS Popham (PF-90), a US Navy patrol frigate transferred to the UK, which served in the Royal Navy as the frigate HMS Somaliland (K594)
