= HMS Dittisham =

Minesweeper of the Royal Navy

History

United Kingdom
- Name: HMS Dittisham
- Namesake: Dittisham
- Builder: Fairlie Yacht
- Launched: October 1953
- Completed: 29 June 1954
- Fate: Given to the Sea Cadets, 1983. Broken up 1997.

General characteristics
- Class & type: Ham class minesweeper
- Type: Minesweeper
- Displacement: 120 long tons (122 t) standard; 164 long tons (167 t) full load
- Length: 100 ft (30 m) p/p; 106 ft 6 in (32.46 m) o/a
- Beam: 21 ft 4 in (6.50 m)
- Draught: 5 ft 6 in (1.68 m)
- Propulsion: 2 shaft Paxman 12YHAXM diesels; 1,100 bhp (820 kW)
- Speed: 14 knots (16 mph; 26 km/h)
- Complement: 2 officers, 13 ratings
- Armament: 1 × Bofors 40 mm L/60 gun or Oerlikon 20 mm cannon
- Notes: Pennant number(s): M2621 / IMS23

HMS Dittisham was one of 93 ships of the Ham-class of inshore minesweepers built for the British Royal Navy. Their names were all chosen from villages ending in -ham. The minesweeper was named after Dittisham in Devon.

== Design and description ==
In the early 1950s, the Royal Navy had a requirement for large numbers of minesweepers to counter the threat to British shipping from Soviet mines in the event of a conventional Third World War. The navy's existing minesweepers were obsolete, while the increasing sophistication of modern mines meant the mine warfare forces could not be supplemented by requisitioned fishing vessels as had been done in previous wars. Large orders were placed for coastal minesweepers (the Ton) and for smaller inshore minesweepers and minehunters intended to operate in inshore waters such as river estuaries (the Ham and Ley classes). As the navy did not have sufficient manpower to operate all the required ships in peacetime, it was planned to lay a large number up in reserve, so they could be manned by reservists (in many cases the crews of the fishing boats which would previously have been used in the same role) in time of emergency.

Dittisham was one of the first series of Ham-class ships, with a composite (wooden planking on aluminium framing) hull, and was 106 feet 9 inches (32.54 m) long overall and 100 feet 0 inches (30.48 m) between perpendiculars, with a beam of 21 feet 2 inches (6.45 m) and a draught of 5 feet 6 inches (1.68 m). Displacement was 120 long tons (120 t) standard and 159 long tons (162 t) full load. Two Paxman 12-cylinder diesel engines gave a total of 1,100 brake horsepower (820 kW) and drove two shafts, giving a top speed of 14 knots (16 mph; 26 km/h), which corresponded to a speed when sweeping of 9 knots (10 mph; 17 km/h). The design armament for the class was a single Bofors 40 mm L/60 gun, although this was generally replaced by an Oerlikon 20 mm cannon.

== Service ==
Dittisham was built by Fairlie Yacht and was launched on 23 October 1953 and completed on 29 June 1954. She was placed in reserve in 1955, being laid up at Hythe, Hampshire and Gosport. In 1968 she became a training tender to HMS Ganges, the Royal Navy's boys' training establishment at RNTE Shotley, where she was used to teach seamanship to the school's students. In 1973 she transferred to HMS Raleigh at Torpoint in 1973. In March 1983, she was sold to the Kingston Sea Cadets and became TS Steadfast. In April 1997, she was towed to Pounds Shipyard at Portsmouth and broken up.
