= Harpham (disambiguation) =

Harpham may refer to:

- Harpham, a village in England
- HMS Harpham (M2634), a Royal Navy minesweeper
- Geoffrey Galt Harpham (born 1946), an American academic
- Harry Harpham (1954–2016), a British politician
