= HMS Greetham =

Minesweeper of the Royal Navy

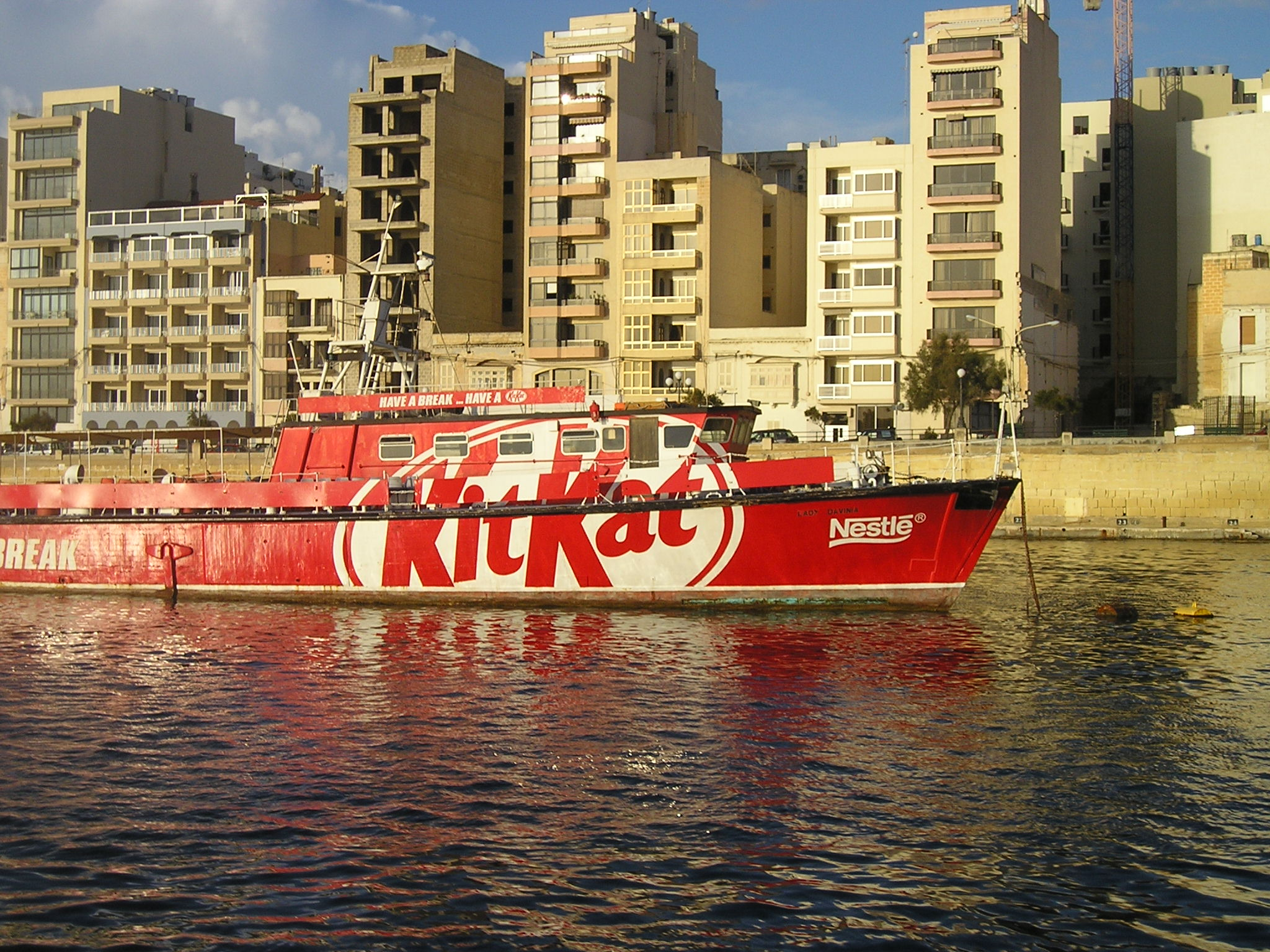
- HMS Greetham as Lady Davinia, anchored off Sliema, Malta in 2004

History

United Kingdom
- Name: HMS Greetham
- Namesake: Greetham, Lincolnshire
- Ordered: 17 October 1951
- Builder: Herd & McKenzie, Buckie
- Launched: 19 April 1954
- Completed: 5 February 1955
- Fate: Transferred to Libya 1962

Libya
- Name: Zuara
- Acquired: November 1962
- Decommissioned: 1973
- Fate: Sold in Malta, 1973.

Malta
- Name: Lady Davinia
- Operator: Captain Morgan Cruises
- Port of registry: Valletta
- Acquired: 1973
- Fate: Sunk, 2008.; Partially destroyed, June 2011.

General characteristics
- Class & type: Ham-class minesweeper
- Displacement: 120 long tons (122 t) standard; 164 long tons (167 t) full load
- Length: 100 ft (30 m) p/p; 106 ft 6 in (32.46 m) o/a
- Beam: 21 ft 4 in (6.50 m)
- Draught: 5 ft 6 in (1.68 m)
- Propulsion: 2 shaft Paxman 12YHAXM diesels; 1,100 bhp (820 kW)
- Speed: 14 knots (16 mph; 26 km/h)
- Complement: 2 officers, 13 ratings
- Armament: 1 × Bofors 40 mm L/60 gun or Oerlikon 20 mm cannon
- Notes: Pennant number(s): M2632 / IMS34

HMS Greetham was one of 93 ships of the Ham class of inshore minesweepers. All ships in this class had names chosen from villages ending in -ham. The minesweeper was built by the firm of Herd & McKenzie in Buckie, Moray and was named after Greetham, Lincolnshire. Entering service in 1955, the vessel was transferred to the Libyan Navy in 1962 on loan and permanently in 1966. Renamed Zuara, the minesweeper was used as a patrol vessel until 1973. Zuara was sold to Captain Morgan Cruises of Malta for commercial use and renamed Lady Davinia. The ship was taken out of service in 2007 and laid up at Sliema Creek. Lady Davinia sank at her moorings in 2008 and for a short time became a diving attraction but in 2011 the wreck was partially broken up after being named a navigational hazard.

== Design and description ==
The Ham class had a normal displacement of 120 long tons (120 t) and 159 long tons (162 t) at deep load. The minesweepers were 100 feet (30 m) long between perpendiculars and from 106.6–107.6 feet (32.5–32.8 m) long overall with a beam of 21–22 feet (6.4–6.7 m) and a draught of 5.6–5.9 feet (1.7–1.8 m). The vessels were propelled by two shafts powered by two Davey Paxman 12-cylinder diesel engines creating 1,100 brake horsepower (820 kW). This gave the minesweepers a maximum speed of 14 knots (26 km/h; 16 mph). The Ham class had a range of 2,350 nautical miles (4,350 km; 2,700 mi) at 9 knots (17 km/h; 10 mph).

Ham-class minesweepers were armed with one 40-millimetre (1.6 in) Mk 7 Bofors gun or one 20-millimetre (0.8 in) cannon. The vessels were equipped with Type 978 radar and had a complement of 15. The class was designed to operate in shallow coastal waters and were of wooden construction.

== Service history ==
The minesweeper was ordered on 17 October 1951 and constructed by Herd & McKenzie at their yard in Buckie, Scotland. The ship was launched on 19 April 1954. Greetham was loaned to the Libyan Navy in November 1962, along with HMS Harpham. These were the first two ships in the newly formed Libyan Navy. She was transferred permanently in September 1966, and she was renamed Zuara. She was used as a coastal patrol vessel until 1973, when she was decommissioned. (Note: Both Colledge and the Miramar Ship Index state the ship was broken up in 1973.)

That year, Zuara was sold to Captain Morgan Cruises, a Maltese tour operator, and was renamed MV Lady Davinia. For a number of years she had a distinctive red and white Kit Kat paint scheme. In 2007 she was decommissioned and was laid up in Sliema Creek awaiting her fate. Lady Davinia sank at her moorings in Sliema Creek in 2008. The exact date of sinking is unknown. The site quickly became popular with divers, as it was easily accessible and was full of marine life. Since it was not purposely sunk, the wreck was intact, with wine bottles and cutlery scattered around it, and soft drinks and beer cans still in the fridge.

The wreck was to be lifted and broken up in June 2011 as it was considered a navigational hazard. However, the workers only managed to remove part of the wreck, leaving the stern, engines and heaps of twisted metal at the bottom. Some remaining oil in the ship's tanks was spilt, and large holes were dug in the seabed. Due to this, most of the marine life area around the wreck was killed off.
