= HMS Aveley =

Minehunter of the Royal Navy

History

United Kingdom
- Name: Aveley
- Namesake: Aveley, Essex
- Builder: J. Samuel White
- Commissioned: 3 February 1954
- Decommissioned: 1982
- Identification: Pennant number: M2002
- Fate: Given to Woolwich Sea Cadet Corps in 1983

General characteristics
- Class & type: Ley-class minehunter
- Displacement: 164 tons
- Length: 107 ft (33 m)
- Beam: 22 ft (6.7 m)
- Draught: 15.5 ft (4.7 m)
- Propulsion: 2 Paxman diesel 550 hp (410 kW)
- Speed: 14 knots (26 km/h; 16 mph) max
- Complement: 15–22
- Armament: 1 × 20 mm gun

HMS Aveley was a Ley-class inshore minehunter of the Royal Navy. Aveley was built by J. Samuel White at their Cowes, Isle of Wight shipyard, being launched in 1953 and completing the next year. She remained in Royal Navy service until 1982, spending several years laid up in reserve, and from 1963 to 1980 was used for training at Portsmouth. In 1983, the ship was sold to the Woolwich Sea Cadets and renamed TS Woolwich. Woolwich was scrapped from November 1986.

== Design and description ==
In the early 1950s, the Royal Navy had a requirement for large numbers of minesweepers to counter the threat to British shipping from Soviet mines in the event of a conventional Third World War. The navy's existing minesweepers were obsolete, while the increasing sophistication of modern mines meant the mine warfare forces could not be supplemented by requisitioned fishing vessels as had been done in previous wars. Large orders were placed for coastal minesweepers (the Ton) and for smaller inshore minesweepers and minehunters intended to operate in inshore waters such as river estuaries (the Ham and Ley classes). As the navy did not have sufficient human resources to operate all the required ships in peacetime, it was planned to lay a large number up in reserve, so they could be crewed by reservists (in many cases the crews of the fishing boats which would previously have been used in the same role) in time of emergency.

The Leys were of composite construction, with aluminium alloy framing and wooden planked hulls. Aveley was 106 feet 9 inches (32.54 m) long overall and 100 feet 0 inches (30.48 m) between perpendiculars, with a beam of 21 feet 9 inches (6.63 m) and a draught of 5 feet 6 inches (1.68 m). Displacement was 123 long tons (125 t) standard and 164 long tons (167 t) deep load. Aveley was powered by two Paxman diesel engines, with a total power of 700 bhp (520 kW). This gave a speed of 13 kn (15 mph; 24 km/h). The Leys were armed with a single Bofors 40 mm gun or an Oerlikon 20 mm cannon. Aveley seems to have been initially armed with a Bofors gun, but by 1979, was recorded as being armed with a 20 mm gun. The ship had a peacetime crew of 15, that would increase to 22 in times of war.

== History ==
Aveley, originally to be called Grey Bantam, was ordered on 9 September 1950, was launched at J. Samuel White's Cowes, Isle of Wight shipyard on 16 February 1953, and was completed on 3 February 1954. The ship was immediately placed into the 51st Minehunting Squadron. In 1956, the ship deployed during the Suez Campaign as part of Operation Musketeer and it was planned to take part in an effort to clear naval mines and obstructions from the harbour at Alexandria in advance of an amphibious landing. Aveley reached Malta in September and participated in preparatory drills, but the landing site was shifted to Suez and all minehunters were ordered back to the United Kingdom by October.

Aveley was placed into reserve at Rosneath in 1957 and was moved to a cradle onshore the following year. It remained there until 1963 when it became a training tender at Plymouth, where it remained until 1980. Aveley was placed on the disposal list in 1982. On 21 May 1983, the ship was sold to the Woolwich Sea Cadet Corps and renamed TS Woolwich. In February 1986, the ship was replaced by the Ton-class minesweeper Wotton, and on 21 November 1986, arrived at the Portsmouth shipbreaking yard of Pounds for scrapping.
