= HMS Sulham =

Minesweeper of the Royal Navy

History

United Kingdom
- Name: HMS Sulham
- Namesake: Sulham
- Builder: Fairlie Yacht
- Launched: 24 March 1955
- Completed: 21 July 1955
- Fate: Transferred to France, 1955

France
- Name: Jonquille
- Acquired: 1955
- Fate: Broken up, 1985

General characteristics
- Class & type: Ham-class minesweeper
- Notes: Pennant number(s): M2732 / IMS69

HMS Sulham was a Ham-class minesweeper of the Royal Navy.

Their names were all chosen from villages ending in -ham. The minesweeper was named after Sulham in Berkshire.
