= HMS Pagham =

Minesweeper of the Royal Navy

History

United Kingdom
- Name: HMS Pagham
- Namesake: Pagham
- Builder: Jones Slip
- Launched: 4 October 1955
- Completed: 22 March 1956
- Fate: Sold 1983

General characteristics
- Class & type: Ham-class minesweeper
- Notes: Pennant number(s): M2716 / IMS53

HMS Pagham was one of 93 ships of the Ham-class of inshore minesweepers.

Their names were all chosen from villages ending in -ham. The minesweeper was named after Pagham in West Sussex.

In 1978 she was loaned to the Stranraer Sea Cadet Unit, and formally given to them on 1 May 1999. After the closure of the Stranraer Sea Cadet unit the MOD/SCC sold her for a nominal fee to a private owner who stripped her of reclaimable parts.

In March 2008 she lies part stripped of usable parts and with a significant list in Drummore harbour, near Stranraer.
