= HMS Popham =

Minesweeper of the Royal Navy

History

United Kingdom
- Name: HMS Popham
- Namesake: Popham, Hampshire
- Builder: Vosper & Company
- Laid down: 1954
- Launched: 11 January 1955
- Completed: 4 October 1955
- Fate: Transferred to the RAN 9 June 1966. Sold 17 February 1976.

General characteristics
- Class & type: Ham-class minesweeper
- Notes: Pennant number(s): M2782 / IMS82

HMS Popham was a Ham-class minesweeper for the Royal Navy.

Their names were all chosen from villages ending in -ham. The minesweeper was named after Popham, Hampshire.

HMS Popham was laid down in 1954 as HMS Hatterley at Vospers (the Ley class was similar to the Ham class, but only 10 ships were built). Following completion she remained in operational reserve at Hythe on Southampton Water until 1956. She was then land-cradled at Rosneath on the Clyde until 1963, and transferred to the Royal Australian Navy on 9 June 1966. She arrived in Sydney as deck cargo on board the freighter Gladstone Star on 3 September 1967. Although she was due to be converted into a diving tender and renamed Otter (Y.299), she remained in reserve in a cradle at Garden Island, Sydney. She was listed for disposal on 31 December 1975 and sold on 17 February 1976.
