= Pulham =

Village and civil parish in Dorset, England

Coordinates: 50.8765°N 2.4179°W

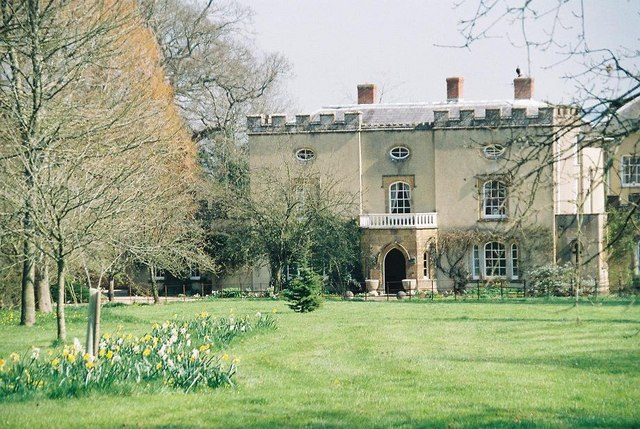
- The Old Rectory, Pulham

- Location within Dorset
- Population: 269 (2011)
- OS grid reference: ST706086
- Civil parish: Pulham
- Unitary authority: Dorset
- Ceremonial county: Dorset
- Region: South West
- Country: England
- Sovereign state: United Kingdom
- Post town: DORCHESTER
- Postcode district: DT2
- Dialling code: 01258, 01300
- Police: Dorset
- Fire: Dorset and Wiltshire
- Ambulance: South Western
- UK Parliament: North Dorset

Pulham is a village and civil parish in the county of Dorset in south-west England. It is situated in the Blackmore Vale, 7 miles (11 kilometres) southeast of Sherborne. In the 2011 Census the civil parish had 105 dwellings, 103 households and a population of 269.

Pulham was mentioned in the Domesday Book of 1086, and was once owned by Cirencester Abbey, a connection remembered in the name of Cannings Court Farm (the "Court of the Canons"). Priests from nearby Milton Abbey also used to visit the village church; they resided above the porch in a priests' room, accessed via a staircase within the wall.

== Notable people ==
George Saxby Penfold was Rector of Pulham from 1797 to 1832, but after 1815 held other livings as well.

== See also ==
- HMS Pulham, a Ham class minesweeper
