= HMS Sparham =

Minesweeper of the Royal Navy

History

United Kingdom
- Name: HMS Sparham
- Namesake: Sparham
- Builder: Vosper & Company
- Launched: 14 October 1954
- Completed: 26 July 1955
- Fate: Transferred to France, 30 September 1955

France
- Name: Hibiscus
- Acquired: 30 September 1955
- Stricken: 1986

General characteristics
- Class & type: Ham-class minesweeper
- Notes: Pennant number(s): M2731 / IMS68

HMS Sparham was a Ham-class minesweeper of the Royal Navy.

Their names were all chosen from villages ending in -ham. The minesweeper was named after Sparham in Norfolk.
