= HMS Tibenham =

Minesweeper of the Royal Navy

History

United Kingdom
- Name: HMS Tibenham
- Namesake: Tibenham
- Builder: McGruer, Clynder
- Launched: 10 March 1955
- Completed: 28 April 1955
- Fate: Transferred to France, 1955

France
- Name: Geranium
- Acquired: 1955
- Stricken: 1987

General characteristics
- Class & type: Ham-class minesweeper
- Notes: Pennant number(s): M2734 / IMS71

HMS Tibenham was a Ham-class minesweeper of the Royal Navy.

Their names were all chosen from villages ending in -ham. The minesweeper was named after Tibenham, Norfolk.
