= HMS Frettenham =

Minesweeper of the Royal Navy

History

United Kingdom
- Name: HMS Frettenham
- Namesake: Frettenham
- Builder: J. Samuel White
- Launched: 18 May 1954
- Completed: 14 September 1954
- Fate: Sold to France, 13 December 1954
- Notes: Pennant number(s): M2701 / IMS20

France
- Name: Tulipe
- Acquired: 13 December 1954
- Fate: broken up, 1989

General characteristics
- Class & type: Ham-class minesweeper
- Displacement: 120 tons standard; 164 tons full
- Length: 106 ft 6 in (32.46 m)
- Beam: 22 ft (6.7 m)
- Draught: 5 ft 9 in (1.75 m)
- Propulsion: 2 shaft Paxman 12YHAXM diesels, 1,100 bhp (820 kW)
- Speed: 14 knots (26 km/h)
- Complement: 2 officers, 13 ratings
- Armament: 1 × Bofors 40 mm L/60 gun / 20 mm Oerlikon gun

HMS Frettenham was a Ham-class minesweeper of the Royal Navy.

Their names were all chosen from villages ending in -ham. The minesweeper was named after Frettenham in Norfolk.
