= HMS Puttenham =

Minesweeper of the Royal Navy

History

United Kingdom
- Name: HMS Puttenham
- Namesake: Puttenham (Note: There are two places called Puttenham: Puttenham, Hertfordshire and Puttenham, Surrey. Neither is large; neither is on the coast; and it is unclear which one was intended.)
- Builder: John I. Thornycroft & Company
- Launched: 25 June 1956
- Completed: 9 May 1958
- Fate: Sold 1980

General characteristics
- Class & type: Ham-class minesweeper
- Notes: Pennant number(s): M2784 / IMS84

HMS Puttenham (M2784) was a Ham-class inshore minesweeper of the Royal Navy. She was launched in 1956 and entered service in 1958. The 93 ships of the Ham class had names chosen from villages ending in -ham. The minesweeper was named after Puttenham.

== Design and description ==
In the early 1950s, the Royal Navy had a requirement for large numbers of minesweepers to counter the threat to British shipping from Soviet mines in the event of a conventional Third World War. The navy's existing minesweepers were obsolete, while the increasing sophistication of modern mines meant the mine warfare forces could not be supplemented by requisitioned fishing vessels as had been done in previous wars. Large orders were placed for coastal minesweepers (the Ton) and for smaller inshore minesweepers and minehunters intended to operate in inshore waters such as river estuaries (the Ham and Ley classes). As the navy did not have sufficient manpower to operate all the required ships in peacetime, it was planned to lay a large number up in reserve, so they could be manned by reservists (in may cases the crews of the fishing boats which would previously have been used in the same role) in time of emergency.

Puttenham was one of the third series of Ham-class ships, with an all-wooden hull, slightly larger than the first two series. The ship was 107 feet 5 inches (32.74 m) long overall and 100 feet 0 inches (30.48 m) between perpendiculars, with a beam of 21 feet 11 inches (6.68 m) and a draught of 5 feet 9 inches (1.75 m). Displacement was 120 long tons (120 t) standard and 159 long tons (162 t) full load. Two Paxman 12-cylinder diesel engines gave a total of 1,100 brake horsepower (820 kW) and drove two shafts, giving a top speed of 14 knots (16 mph; 26 km/h), which corresponded to a speed when sweeping of 9 knots (10 mph; 17 km/h). The design armament for the class was a single Bofors 40 mm L/60 gun, although this was generally replaced by an Oerlikon 20 mm cannon.

== Service ==
Puttenham was built by John I. Thornycroft & Company, was launched on 25 June 1956 and completed on 9 May 1958. She was laid up in reserve ashore at Rosneath in Scotland from 1958 to 1963. In 1964, Puttenham was allocated to the Royal Naval Auxiliary Service (RNXS) at Devonport.

In June 1967, HMS Puttenham, equipped with twelve divers under the command of Engineer-Lieutenant Roy Graham, sailed to the Isles of Scilly in search of the wrecks of the great naval disaster in 1707. The wreck of HMS Association, a 90-gun second rate ship of the line, was finally located. Divers first discovered a cannon, and on the third dive, silver and gold coins were spotted. More than 2,000 coins and other artefacts were later recovered from the site and auctioned by Sotheby's in July 1969.

Puttenham remained in service with the RNXS at Plymouth until 1978. HMS Puttenham eventually ended service for the Royal Navy in 1980. She was sold to a private company and changes were later made to her superstructure. She continued serving in Greece as the passenger ferry Eleftheria until she was finally dismantled in Crete in November 2006, after 50 years at sea.
