= HMS Rackham =

Minesweeper of the Royal Navy

History

United Kingdom
- Name: HMS Rackham
- Namesake: Rackham
- Builder: Saunders-Roe
- Launched: 27 April 1956
- Completed: 26 June 1956
- Fate: Sold July 1967

General characteristics
- Class & type: Ham-class minesweeper
- Notes: Pennant number(s): M2722 / IMS59

HMS Rackham was one of 93 ships of the Ham-class of inshore minesweepers.

Their names were all chosen from villages ending in -ham. The minesweeper was named after Rackham in West Sussex.
