= HMS Sidlesham =

Ham-class inshore minesweeper of the Royal Navy

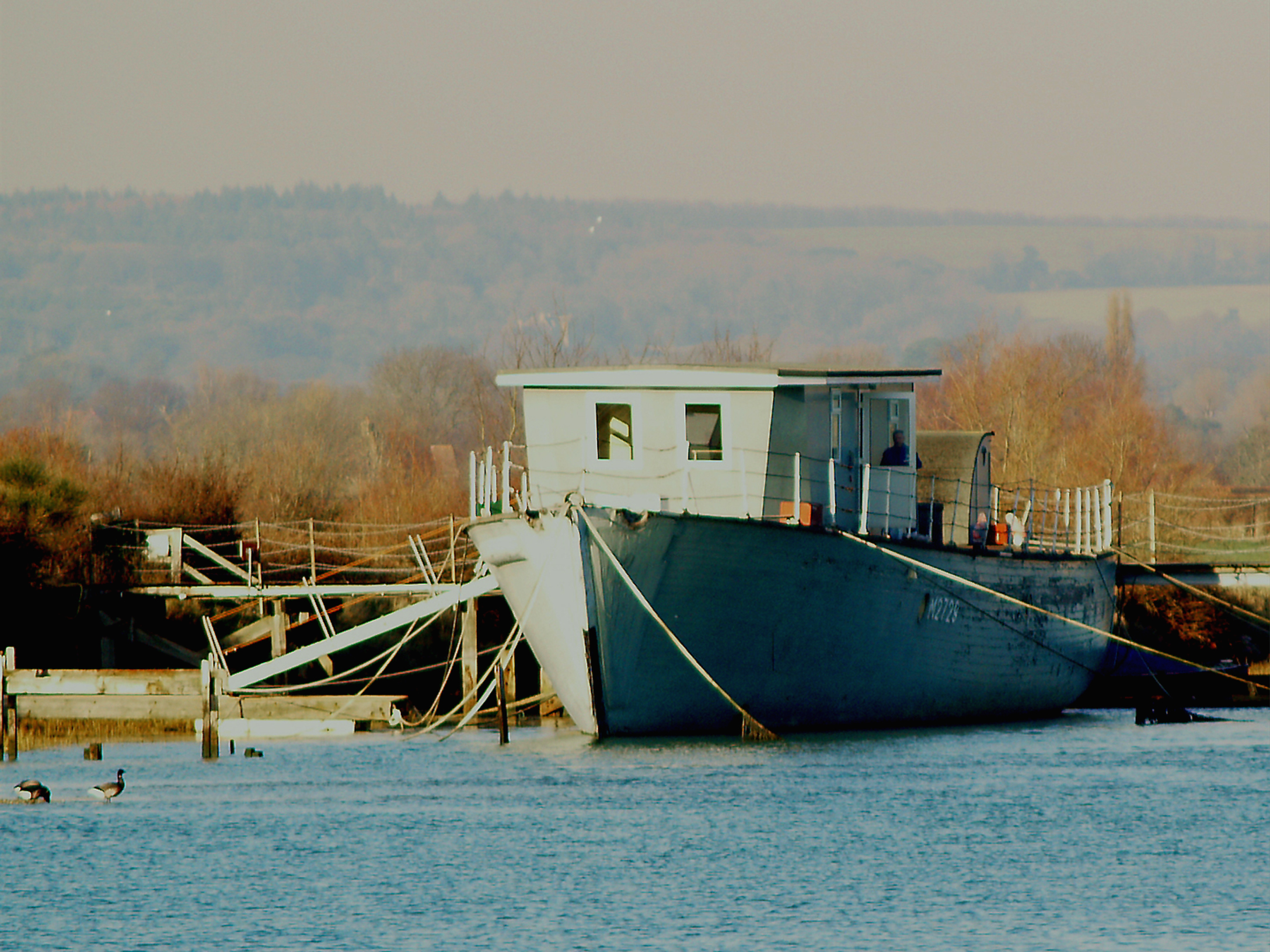
- Former minesweeper HMS Sidlesham (in use as TS Gerald Daniel) moored on Bosham Channel, Chichester Harbour, 11 February 2008

History

United Kingdom
- Name: HMS Sidlesham
- Namesake: Sidlesham
- Builder: P. K. Harris
- Launched: 25 March 1955
- Completed: 23 November 1955
- Identification: Pennant number(s): M2729 / IMS66
- Fate: Sold July 1967

General characteristics
- Class & type: Ham-class minesweeper

HMS Sidlesham was one of 93 ships of the Ham-class of inshore minesweepers. Their names were all chosen from villages ending in "-ham". This minesweeper was named after Sidlesham in West Sussex.

== Current use ==
HMS Sidlesham was renamed TS Gerald Daniel, when it was permanently moored in Bosham Channel in Chichester Harbour, and used as a training centre for the Sussex Police. It was named after PC Gerald Daniel who was killed in service for the Sussex Police.

In 1985, the youth organisation Christian Youth Enterprises bought the vessel and have since run it as an activity centre for young people and adults. In April 2007, the vessel was moored in Chichester Harbour and in use as accommodation at a Youth Sailing Centre.

In 2010, Gerald Daniel, formerly HMS Sidlesham was purchased by a private individual and is now moored on the River Thames near Chelsea Harbour.

In January 2017, the vessel was beached and abandoned at Battersea after taking on water. In February 2018 the ship was listed on the Apollo Duck shipbroker's website as being for sale by Riverhomes South West London under the name HMS Sidlesham in a dazzle camouflage paint scheme.
