= HMS Stedham =

Minesweeper of the Royal Navy

History

United Kingdom
- Name: HMS Stedham
- Namesake: Stedham
- Builder: M.W. Blackmore
- Launched: 12 January 1955
- Completed: 28 July 1955
- Fate: Transferred to France, 1955

France
- Name: Jasmine
- Acquired: 1955
- Stricken: 1985

General characteristics
- Class & type: Ham-class minesweeper
- Notes: Pennant number(s): M2730 / IMS67

HMS Stedham was a Ham-class minesweeper of the Royal Navy.

Their names were all chosen from villages ending in -ham. The minesweeper was named after Stedham in West Sussex.
