= HMS Shipham =

Minesweeper of the Royal Navy

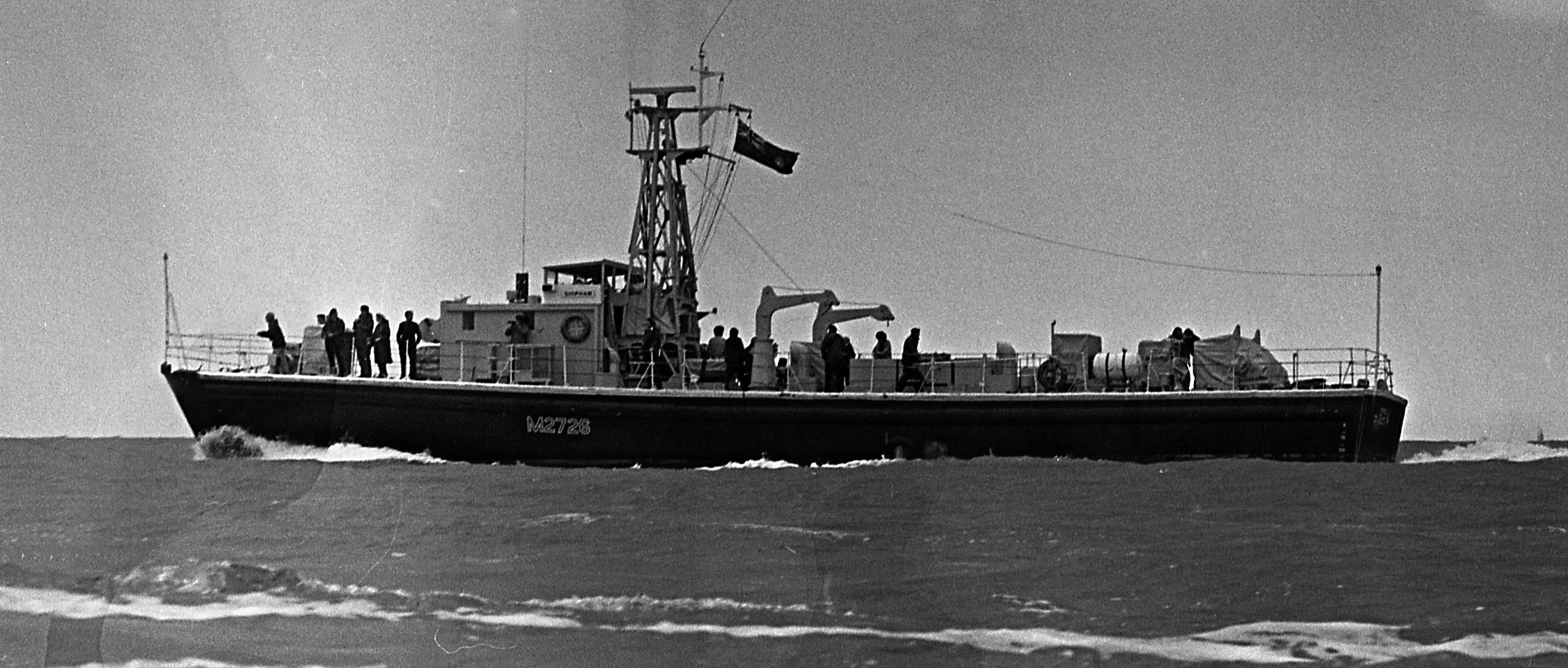
- HMS Shipham, off Great Yarmouth, 1978.

History

United Kingdom
- Name: HMS Shipham
- Namesake: Shipham
- Builder: Brooke Marine
- Launched: 14 July 1955
- Completed: 3 February 1956
- Fate: Sold 1986

General characteristics
- Class & type: Ham-class minesweeper
- Notes: Pennant number(s): M2726 / IMS63

HMS Shipham was one of 93 ships of the Ham-class of inshore minesweepers.

Their names were all chosen from villages ending in -ham. The minesweeper was named after Shipham in Somerset.

From at least 1970 to 1985, HMS Shipham was known as XSV Shipham. During this period she was in service with the Royal Naval Auxiliary Service (R.N.X.S.) along with several of her sister ships, including Portisham, and Thakeham. The change from, Her Majesty's Ship - HMS to auXiliary Service Vessel - XSV was to avoid confusion between an armed warship, and a civilian crewed, unarmed, training vessel, yet still under Admiralty control.
