= HMS Ledsham =

Minesweeper of the Royal Navy

History

United Kingdom
- Name: HMS Ledsham
- Builder: J. Bolson, Poole
- Launched: 30 June 1954
- Completed: 22 March 1955
- Out of service: Sold April 1971
- Renamed: by 2007 Nipatina
- Fate: After being moored at Deptford Creek, London since 2007 the ship caught fire in January 2017.

General characteristics
- Class & type: Ham-class minesweeper
- Displacement: 120 tons standard; 164 tons full
- Length: 106 ft 6 in (32.46 m)
- Beam: 22 ft (6.7 m)
- Draught: 5 ft 9 in (1.75 m)
- Propulsion: 2 shaft Paxman 12YHAXM diesels, 1,100 bhp (820 kW)
- Speed: 14 knots (26 km/h)
- Complement: 2 officers, 13 ratings
- Armament: 1 × Bofors 40 mm L/60 gun / 20 mm Oerlikon gun
- Notes: Pennant number(s): M2706 / IMS43

HMS Ledsham was one of 93 ships of the Ham class of inshore minesweepers. Their names were all chosen from villages ending in -ham. The minesweeper was named after Ledsham, Cheshire or Ledsham, West Yorkshire.

She was built by J. Bolson & Son Ltd. at Poole, and launched on 30 June 1954.

HMS Ledsham was sold on 1971 for breaking up at Newhaven, Sussex. By 1998 she was moored in Deptford Creek, southeast London, as a venue for local events, but the stern was damaged by fire in 2008.

From 2012 she was repaired and renovated as the centre of The Minesweeper Collective, an artists' cooperative. The minesweeper housed a printing studio, and was a venue for art and music events. On the night of 5 January 2017 an explosion near the former minesweeper led to the ship catching fire whilst the London Fire Brigade deployed a dozen fire engines to the scene.
