= HMS Thakeham =

Minesweeper of the Royal Navy

History

United Kingdom
- Name: HMS Thakeham
- Namesake: Thakeham
- Builder: Fairlie Yacht
- Launched: 9 September 1957
- Completed: 15 November 1957
- Fate: Sold 1977

General characteristics
- Class & type: Ham-class minesweeper
- Notes: Pennant number(s): M2733 / IMS70

HMS Thakeham was one of 93 ships of the Ham-class of inshore minesweepers.

Their names were all chosen from villages ending in -ham. The minesweeper was named after Thakeham in West Sussex.
