= HMS Tongham =

Minesweeper of the Royal Navy

History

United Kingdom
- Name: HMS Tongham
- Namesake: Tongham
- Builder: James N Miller & Sons, St Monance
- Launched: 30 November 1955
- Completed: 18 June 1957
- Fate: Sold 1980

General characteristics
- Class & type: Ham-class minesweeper
- Notes: Pennant number(s): M2735 / IMS72

HMS Tongham was one of 93 ships in the Ham-class of inshore minesweepers. Their names were all chosen from villages ending in -ham; in this case, Tongham in Surrey. She was built in Scotland by James N Miller & Sons at St Monance, Fife, with a fully-wooden hull. Launched on 30 November 1955, she was delivered on 18 June 1967, and commissioned with pennant number M2735.

The minesweeper was dry stored ashore at the Gareloch naval base. On release she was used by the Royal Naval Auxiliary Service, and based at Greenock. Tongham was decommissioned, then sold by the Ministry of Defence in 1980.

After leaving the navy, Tongham was taken to Shotley, Essex and underwent some hull restoration at nearby Mistley, where she was again for sale in 2016. In 2017, the new owners moved the ship to Gillingham, Kent, and revealed plans to convert her to a cafe and music centre.
