= HMS Saxlingham =

Minesweeper of the Royal Navy

History

United Kingdom
- Name: HMS Saxlingham
- Namesake: Saxlingham
- Builder: Berthon Boat Company
- Launched: 17 October 1955
- Completed: 29 January 1957
- Fate: Sold April 1968

General characteristics
- Class & type: Ham-class minesweeper
- Notes: Pennant number(s): M2727 / IMS64

HMS Saxlingham was one of 93 ships of the Ham-class of inshore minesweepers.

Their names were all chosen from villages ending in -ham. The minesweeper was named after Saxlingham in Norfolk.

She was sold to Ross & Cromarty County Council education department and converted to a training ship for the nautical college at Lews Castle in Stornoway, Isle of Lewis. The conversion added a cabin to the previously open bridge, removal of mid-ship generators and that space converted to a classroom. She was renamed "Lews Castle" and retained that name until finally decommissioned following damage sustained during a grounding.

She was used for training purposes with 14- to 17-year-old students from the Highlands and Islands intending to make a career in the Merchant Navy, as part of an integrated academic/vocational course in Navigation and Seamanship. As well as being used as a floating classroom, she would undertake short voyages from Stornoway to ports on the north west coast of Scotland.

On 29 May 1973, while on passage to Oban through the Sound of Mull, she suffered failure of both Paxman diesels and was towed into Craignure, on the island of Mull by the Caledonian MacbRayne ferry "Bute". Following inspection by a Paxman engineer who determined that one engine would need replacement, she was towed to the Timbercraft boatyard, at Shandon, Gareloch by the tug "Flying Spray" and made fast to a mooring buoy on 5 June 1973 while awaiting repairs. During a severe storm in mid-January 1974, she was struck by another vessel, causing her to break free from the mooring buoy and go ashore near to the boatyard, suffering serious hull damage and subsequent ingress of water to her interior fittings and furnishings. The boatyard effected temporary repairs and she was then towed to Stornoway, Isle of Lewis, by a local coastal vessel, to await slipping by the Stornoway Boatbuilding Company. She was moored alongside in the Inner Harbour in Stornoway.

The authorities then decided to sell her (without carrying out further repairs) to a local businessman for her scrap value. She was stripped of all fixtures and fittings before being beached and set on fire to liberate the remaining metal parts sometime during 1975.

The original ship's bell from HMS Saxlingham was presented to the Parish Council of Saxlingham in Norfolk along with the history of the vessel.
