= HMS Pulham =

Minesweeper of the Royal Navy

History

United Kingdom
- Name: HMS Pulham
- Namesake: Pulham
- Builder: Saunders-Roe
- Launched: 10 January 1956
- Completed: 10 January 1956
- Fate: Sold August 1966

General characteristics
- Class & type: Ham-class minesweeper
- Notes: Pennant number(s): M2721 / IMS58

HMS Pulham was one of 93 ships of the Ham-class of inshore minesweepers.

Their names were all chosen from villages ending in -ham.
