= HMS Polsham =

Minesweeper of the Royal Navy

History

United Kingdom
- Name: HMS Polsham
- Namesake: Polsham
- Builder: Morgan Giles Ltd.
- Launched: 13 October 1958
- Completed: 6 April 1960
- Fate: Sold to the Port of London Authority, February 1967

General characteristics
- Class & type: Ham-class minesweeper
- Notes: Pennant number(s): M2792 / IMS92

HMS Polsham was one of 93 ships of the Ham class of inshore minesweepers.

Their names were chosen from villages ending in -ham. The minesweeper was named after Polsham in Somerset.

HMS Polsham was sold in February 1967 to the Port of London Authority who converted the vessel into a hydrographic survey ship, operated out of the Thames Navigation Service centre at Gravesend, Kent. She was renamed the MV Maplin. It is understood that she no longer operates in this capacity, but her fate is unknown.
