= HMS Warmingham =

Minesweeper of the Royal Navy

History

United Kingdom
- Name: HMS Warmingham
- Namesake: Warmingham
- Builder: Thornycroft
- Launched: 23 April 1954
- Completed: 30 November 1956
- Fate: Sold 1983

General characteristics
- Class & type: Ham-class minesweeper
- Notes: Pennant number(s): M2737 / IMS74

HMS Warmingham was one of 93 ships of the Ham-class of inshore minesweepers. All of the ships in this class had names that were chosen from villages ending in -ham. HMS Warmingham was named after Warmingham, in Cheshire, England.
