= HMS Whippingham (M2739) =

Minesweeper of the Royal Navy

History

United Kingdom
- Name: HMS Whippingham
- Namesake: Whippingham
- Builder: Jason Taylor
- Launched: 28 August 1954
- Completed: 21 June 1955
- Fate: Transferred to France, 1955

France
- Name: Dahlia
- Acquired: 1955
- Stricken: 1992

General characteristics
- Class & type: Ham-class minesweeper
- Notes: Pennant number(s): M2739 / IMS76

HMS Whippingham was a Ham-class minesweeper of the Royal Navy.

Their names were all chosen from villages ending in -ham. The minesweeper was named after Whippingham on the Isle of Wight.
