= HMS Powderham =

Minesweeper of the Royal Navy

History

United Kingdom
- Name: 1958-1964: Powderham; 1964-1995: Waterwitch
- Namesake: Powderham
- Builder: J. Samuel White, Cowes
- Launched: 27 November 1958
- Completed: 22 May 1960
- Decommissioned: March 1995
- Reclassified: survey vessel, 1964
- Fate: Sold 1986

General characteristics
- Class & type: Ham-class minesweeper
- Notes: Pennant number: M2720

HMS Powderham was one of 93 ships of the Ham class of inshore minesweepers named after villages ending in -ham, in this case Powderham in Devon. She was launched on 27 November 1958 by J. Samuel White & Company Ltd, Cowes and commissioned in 1959. She was allocated pennant number M 2720.

Commissioned as a minesweeper in 1959, she was allocated to the Special Trials Unit, Portsmouth Dockyard and the Forth Division Royal Naval Reserve, based at Rosyth. In 1964 she was converted at Chatham Dockyard to an inshore survey vessel and renamed HMS Waterwitch. Operating in the South Coast Survey Unit with civilian Port Auxiliary Service crew until 1974, she then had a refit before participation in the 1977 Silver Jubilee Fleet Review at Spithead. Thereafter, Waterwitch was attached to the Liverpool University Royal Navy Unit until she was paid off at Portsmouth in March 1995.

== Post-naval service ==
After decommissioning in 1995, Waterwitch was sold to Pounds Shipowners & Shipbreakers Ltd, Portchester and laid up in Portsmouth Harbour. In 1997 she was acquired by "Project M2720", a voluntary non-profit-making group of ex-Royal Navy and Merchant Navy personnel and berthed in North Shields with a view to offering a shipboard training facility for disadvantaged young people.
