= HMS Brigham =

Minesweeper of the Royal Navy

History

United Kingdom
- Name: HMS Brigham
- Namesake: Brigham
- Builder: Berthon Boat Company
- Launched: 4 December 1953
- Completed: 22 December 1953
- Fate: Sold 1968

General characteristics
- Class & type: Ham class minesweeper
- Type: Minesweeper
- Displacement: 120 long tons (122 t) standard; 164 long tons (167 t) full load
- Length: 100 ft (30 m) p/p; 106 ft 6 in (32.46 m) o/a
- Beam: 21 ft 4 in (6.50 m)
- Draught: 5 ft 6 in (1.68 m)
- Propulsion: 2 shaft Paxman 12YHAXM diesels; 1,100 bhp (820 kW)
- Speed: 14 knots (16 mph; 26 km/h)
- Complement: 2 officers, 13 ratings
- Armament: 1 × Bofors 40 mm L/60 gun or Oerlikon 20 mm cannon
- Notes: Pennant number(s): M2613 / IMS13

HMS Brigham was one of 93 ships of the Ham-class of inshore minesweepers.

Their names were all chosen from villages ending in -ham. The minesweeper was named after Brigham in Cumbria.

The ship's bell is now in St Bridget's Church of England Primary School, Brigham, where it was used as a fire alarm until a more modern fire alarm system was installed.

Brigham was sold to Australian interests in 1968 and renamed MV Brigham. Refitted in Southampton as a prospective ferry she sailed with a crew of ten (via Las Palmas, Monrovia, Cape Town, Durban, Mauritius, and Albany) to Port Lincoln, South Australia, arriving on 24 December 1969 after a 16-week voyage, including a lengthy stop in Cape Town.

Sold in 1970 to the Australian company Southern Concrete, and taken to Adelaide for a full refit. Whilst in Adelaide the company experienced financial difficulties and the vessel had the distinction of being the first vessel in many decades to have a warrant pinned to her mast for non-payment of harbour dues.

Sold to NT fishing company sometime after and last heard of in the late 1970s being used as a prawn trawler in the Gulf of Carpentaria.
