= HMS Wexham =

Minesweeper of the Royal Navy

History

United Kingdom
- Name: HMS Wexham
- Namesake: Wexham
- Builder: Jason Taylor
- Launched: 3 April 1954
- Completed: 11 January 1955
- Fate: Transferred to France, 1955

France
- Name: Armoise
- Acquired: 1955
- Stricken: 1987

General characteristics
- Class & type: Ham-class minesweeper
- Notes: Pennant number(s): M2738 / IMS75

HMS Wexham was a Ham-class minesweeper of the Royal Navy.

Their names were all chosen from villages ending in -ham. The minesweeper was named after Wexham in Buckinghamshire.
