= HMS Tresham =

Minesweeper of the Royal Navy

History

United Kingdom
- Name: HMS Tresham
- Namesake: Tresham
- Builder: Morgan Giles Ltd.
- Launched: 11 May 1954
- Completed: 10 November 1955
- Fate: Sold 1966

General characteristics
- Class & type: Ham-class minesweeper
- Notes: Pennant number(s): M2736 / IMS73

HMS Tresham was one of 93 ships of the Ham-class of inshore minesweepers.

Their names were all chosen from villages ending in -ham. The minesweeper was named after Tresham in Gloucestershire.
