= Tresham (surname) =

Tresham is an English surname of Norman origins. The Treshams originally lived in Northampton. Near Northampton, is the village of Tresham, Gloucestershire.

== Notable people with this surname ==
- Francis Tresham (c.1567–1605), Conspirator to commit regicide in the Gunpowder Plot
- Francis Tresham (game designer), United Kingdom-based board game designer
- Henry Tresham (c.1751–1814), Irish-born historical painter active in London in the late 18th century
- Thomas Tresham (speaker) (died 1471), English politician, soldier and administrator
- Thomas Tresham (died 1559), English Catholic politician during the middle of the Tudor dynasty
- Thomas Tresham (died 1605) (1534–1605), English Catholic recusant politician
- William Tresham (died 1450), English lawyer and Speaker of the House of Commons
- William Tresham (priest) (1495–1569), English priest in the Tudor period and an official of the University of Oxford
