= HMS Mickleham =

Minesweeper of the Royal Navy

History

United Kingdom
- Name: HMS Mickleham
- Namesake: Mickleham
- Builder: Berthon Boat Company
- Launched: 11 March 1954
- Completed: 10 May 1955
- Fate: Sold August 1966

General characteristics
- Class & type: Ham class minesweeper
- Displacement: 120 tons standard; 164 tons full
- Length: 106 ft 6 in (32.46 m)
- Beam: 22 ft (6.7 m)
- Draught: 5 ft 9 in (1.75 m)
- Propulsion: 2 shaft Paxman 12YHAXM diesels, 1,100 bhp (820 kW)
- Speed: 14 knots (26 km/h)
- Complement: 2 officers, 13 ratings
- Armament: 1 × Bofors 40 mm L/60 gun / 20 mm Oerlikon gun
- Notes: Pennant number(s): M2710 / IMS47

HMS Mickleham was one of 93 ships of the Ham-class of inshore minesweepers.

Their names were all chosen from villages ending in -ham. The minesweeper was named after Mickleham in Surrey.

== History ==
- Blackman, R.V.B. ed. Jane's Fighting Ships (1953)
- Sold by admiralty in 1966.
- Purchased by John Stanley Gordon of Gordon Keeble sports car fame.
- Renamed 'Katherine of Gower'
- Converted to charter yacht and completed in 1970s.
- Sold to Saudi Arabian interests in the 1980s.
