= HMS Petersham =

Minesweeper of the Royal Navy

History

United Kingdom
- Name: HMS Petersham
- Namesake: Petersham
- Builder: H. McLean, Renfrew
- Launched: 12 January 1955
- Completed: 9 March 1955
- Fate: Transferred to France on completion, 1955

France
- Name: Capucine (M782, A738)
- Acquired: 1955
- Commissioned: 24 June 1955
- Decommissioned: April 1984
- Stricken: 1985
- Fate: Dismantled at Brest

General characteristics
- Class & type: Ham-class minesweeper
- Notes: Pennant number(s): M2718 / IMS55

HMS Petersham was a Ham-class minesweeper of the Royal Navy.

The names in the class were all chosen from British villages ending with -ham. The minesweeper was named after Petersham in Surrey.

Petersham was one of fifteen Ham-class minesweepers financed by the United States for the French Navy under the Mutual Assistance Pact. The whole group were commissioned with the hull number only, in this case M782. It was not until 22 February 1964 that she was renamed Capucine, (Nasturtium), when the class were given floral-themed names.

Capucine was based at Cherbourg in the 16th Minesweeper Division, and saw active service on national and multi-national operations. In 1960 she participated in a Paris boat show, along with other shallow-draught minesweepers. In January 1965 she was mothballed at Cherbourg, in reserve.

In July 1970 Capucine was re-commissioned as a training vessel with the same name and, on 1 June 1973, re-classified as an auxiliary vessel (A738). Following a number of pollution incidents, particularly the Amoco Cadiz oil spill in 1978, the ship was additionally involved in maritime surveillance off Ushant, Brittany.

Capucine was taken out of service in April 1984, the Ham-class ships being replaced by eight new Léopard-class training ships. On 25 September 1984 she was relocated to the naval cemetery at Landévennec with some of her siblings. In 1985 she was sold and broken up at Brest.
