= HMS Pineham =

Minesweeper of the Royal Navy

History

United Kingdom
- Name: HMS Pineham
- Namesake: Pineham
- Builder: H. McLean, Renfrew
- Launched: 9 May 1955
- Completed: 22 July 1955
- Fate: Transferred to France, 10 November 1955

France
- Name: Petunia
- Acquired: 10 November 1955
- Fate: Broken up, 1985

General characteristics
- Class & type: Ham-class minesweeper
- Notes: Pennant number(s): M2719 / IMS56

HMS Pineham was a Ham-class minesweeper of the Royal Navy.

Their names were all chosen from villages ending in -ham. The minesweeper was named after Pineham in Buckinghamshire.
