= Tibenham, Norfolk =

Village and civil parish in Norfolk, England

Coordinates: 52.46377°N 1.14437°E

Tibenham
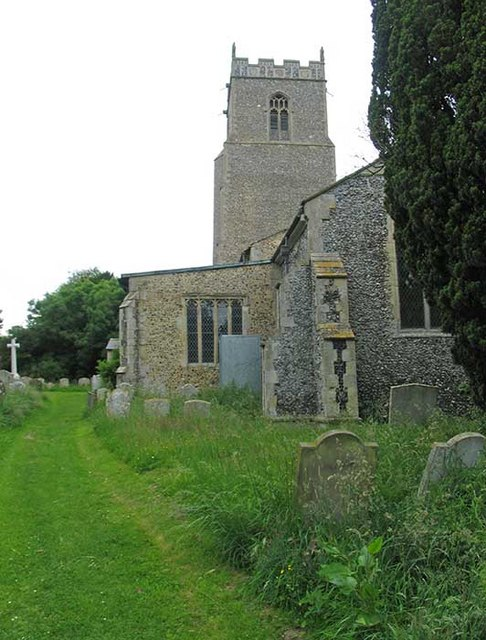
- All Saints, Tibenham

- Location within Norfolk
- Area: 13.34 km^{2} (5.15 sq mi)
- Population: 494
  - Density: 37/km^{2} (96/sq mi)
- OS grid reference: TM137898
  - London: 86 miles (138 km) SW
- Civil parish: Tibenham
- District: South Norfolk
- Shire county: Norfolk
- Region: East
- Country: England
- Sovereign state: United Kingdom
- Post town: NORWICH
- Postcode district: NR16
- Dialling code: 01379
- Police: Norfolk
- Fire: Norfolk
- Ambulance: East of England
- UK Parliament: South Norfolk

Tibenham is a village and civil parish located in the Depwade district of South Norfolk, England. The parish is 2 miles (3.2 km) north west of Tivetshall railway station. It has a public house called The Greyhound. The parish includes the hamlet of Cargate Common.

== History ==
In 1870–72, John Marius Wilson's Imperial Gazetteer of England and Wales described Tibenham as:

"a parish, with a village, in Depwade district, Norfolk; 2 miles NW of Tivetshall r. station, and 7½ S by E of Wymondham...The church is good; and there are a Primitive Methodist chapel"

== RAF Tibenham ==
RAF Tibenham is an airfield and Royal Air Force station located 13.5 miles (21.7 km) southwest of Norwich and 5.8 miles (9.3 km) north of Diss, Norfolk. The site was controlled at various times by the Royal Flying Corps, the United States Army Air Forces and the Royal Air Force. It was used between 1916 and 1920 and between 1942 and 1959.

The Norfolk Gliding Club Air Show and Open Day programme for 1975 includes an article by James Stewart which says,

"When you looked across the airfield, there would have been perhaps twenty or thirty of the big bombers in the olivedrab camouflage dispersed all around the maze of hardstandings leading off the perimeter track....from this base [I] flew 20 combat missions in B. 24.H. Liberators and was Commander of the 703rd Bombardment squadron of the 445th Group."

Since 1960, the airfield has been used by the Norfolk Gliding Club.

The Dad's Army episode "Round and Round went the Great Big Wheel" was filmed at RAF Tibenham.

== Demographics ==
At the 2011 census, the village has a population of 494 (239 males and 255 females).

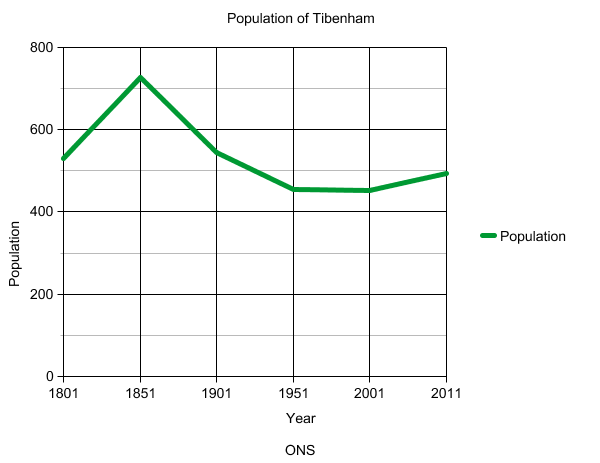
Total Population of Tibenham, Norfolk, as reported by the Census of Population from 1801 to 2011.

The population of Tibenham as reported by the Census of Population from 1801 to 2011 appears to show a trend in population throughout the course of time. The total population of Tibenham appears to take a sharp rise between 1801 and 1851, peaking in 1841, which totalled 727. A steep fall that appears to level off slightly around 1901 onwards can be identified. The population of Tibenham appears to be stagnant between 1951 and 2001, in which both censuses total population of 454.

=== Occupational structure ===
According to archived census data, in 1881 the population of the village was 707. With the southward shift in industry within the country, as well as a shift in career opportunities, it can be seen that Tibenham has since seen a decline in population with the 2011 census totalling 494.

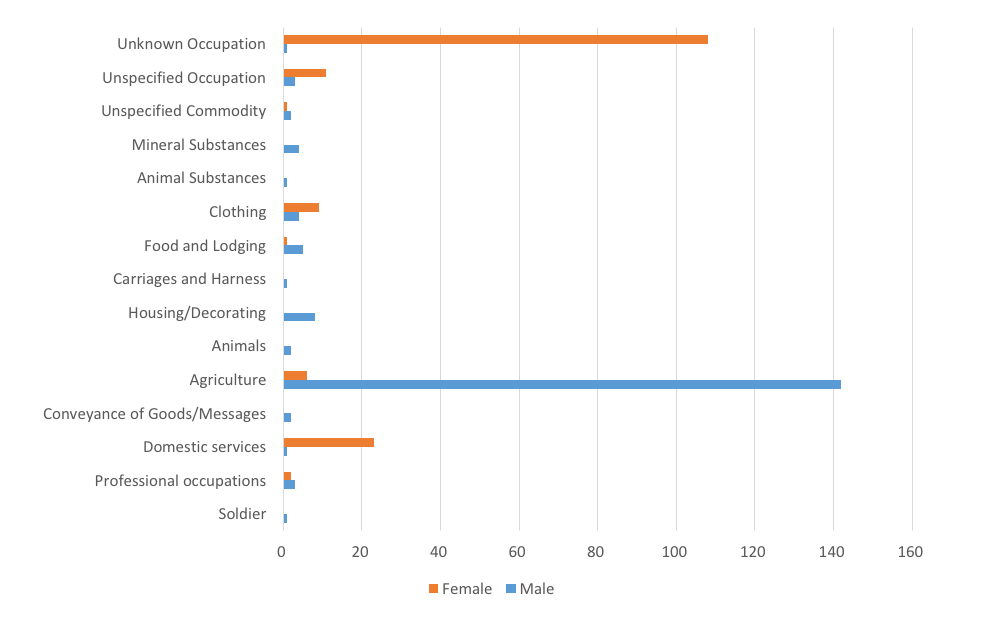
Occupational structure of Tibenham according to the 1881 Census.

The occupations that were available to the village in 1881 can be described as rural with most, if not all, occupations centring around the life and needs of the village community. A large majority of men were involved in agriculture. The total number of 142 includes occupations such as farmers, graziers as well as accounting for their sons, grandsons, brothers and nephews involved in the occupation. Other agricultural occupations included farm bailiffs, agricultural labourers, farm servants, cottagers and agricultural machine proprietors and attendants.

According to the 1881 census, females were involved in a number of occupations, for example being largely involved in domestic services compared to men. Domestic services include domestic indoor servants and washing and bathing services. However, a large majority of women were registered with an "unknown occupation".

== All Saints' Church ==
The eighty-seven and a half foot tower of All Saints' Church is Tibenham's most recognisable and prominent landmark. Within the church are 12 steps that lead to the ringing chamber with a further 35 steps that reach a heavily bound and reinforced door. It is suggested that this was once the treasury. The architecture of the chancel and nave were influenced by the English Gothic era (1250 - 1350), the south aisle and tower to the Perpendicular period (1350 - 1550). The east end of the south aisle at one time constituted the St. Nicholas chapel, and was constructed in the sixteenth century. The church received £31,500 of Heritage Lottery funding in 2003 to renovate and re-cast its bells.

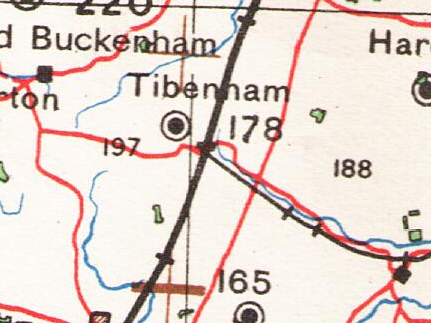
A 20th century Ordnance Survey map showing Tibenham.
