= Liveaboard =

Way of using a boat

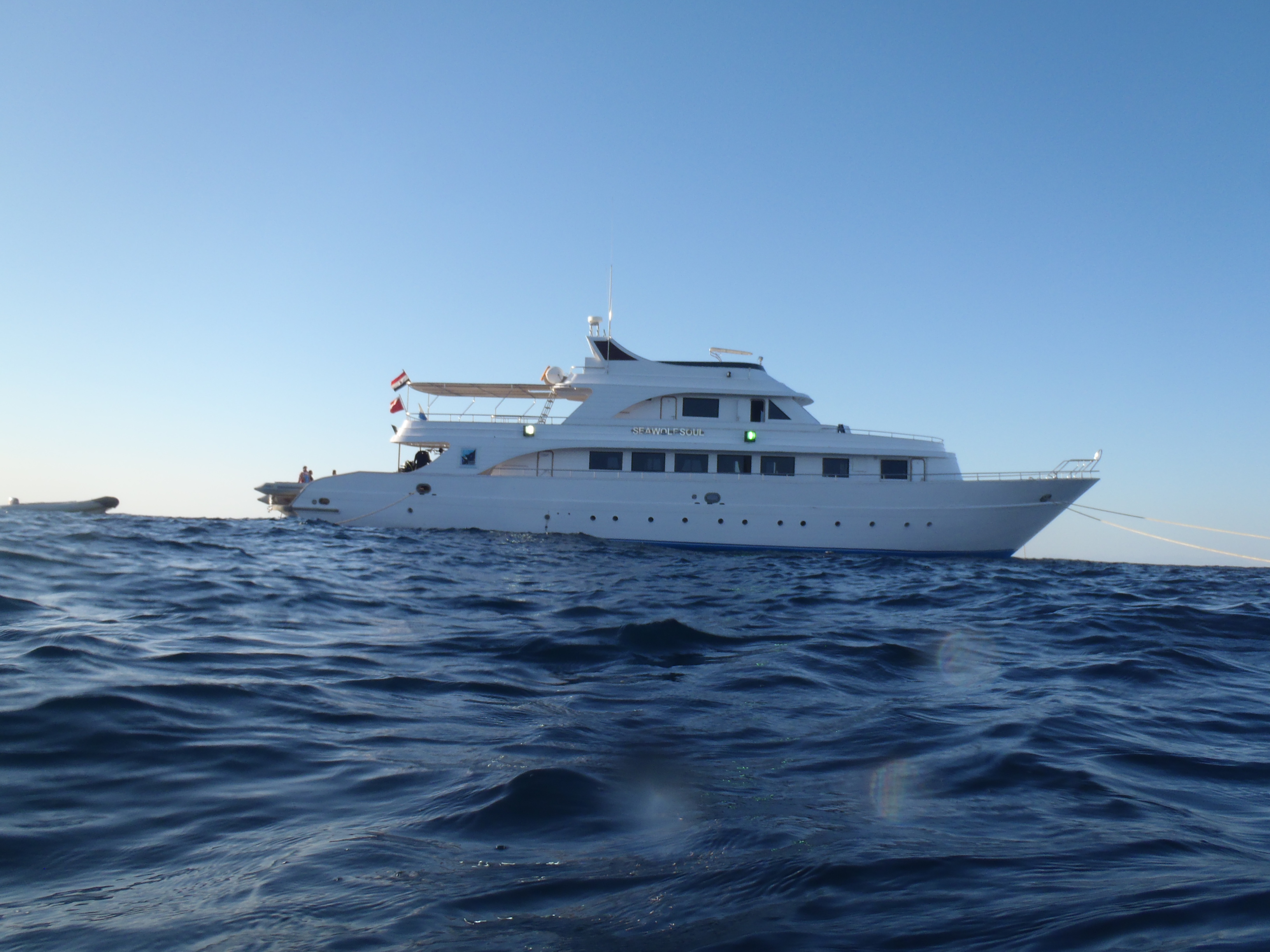
A scuba liveaboard vessel on the Red Sea

Liveaboard can mean:

- Someone who makes a boat, typically a small yacht in a marina, their primary residence. Powerboats and cruising sailboats are commonly used for living aboard, as well as houseboats which are designed primarily as a residence.
- A boat designed for people to live aboard it.
- A boat used for recreational diving expeditions or cruises where the divers live on the boat for the duration of the cruise and use it as a diving support vessel.

The liveaboard lifestyle has attractions and downsides. Most boats are much smaller than equivalent cost shoreside residences, they are more exposed to bad weather, and require special maintenance skills. However, they are mobile, provide water access, and allow for integrated recreational, transportation, and housing costs. Where the cost of housing is high, a liveaboard lifestyle may have cost advantages. Although it is sometimes regarded as being a cheaper way to live this is not always the case. Liveaboard boats can be luxury vessels moored in expensive marinas or small vessels in need of restoration. One attraction of the lifestyle is there is something to suit everyone. Because of this, liveaboards are very diverse people coming from many different backgrounds.

== Scuba diving liveaboards ==
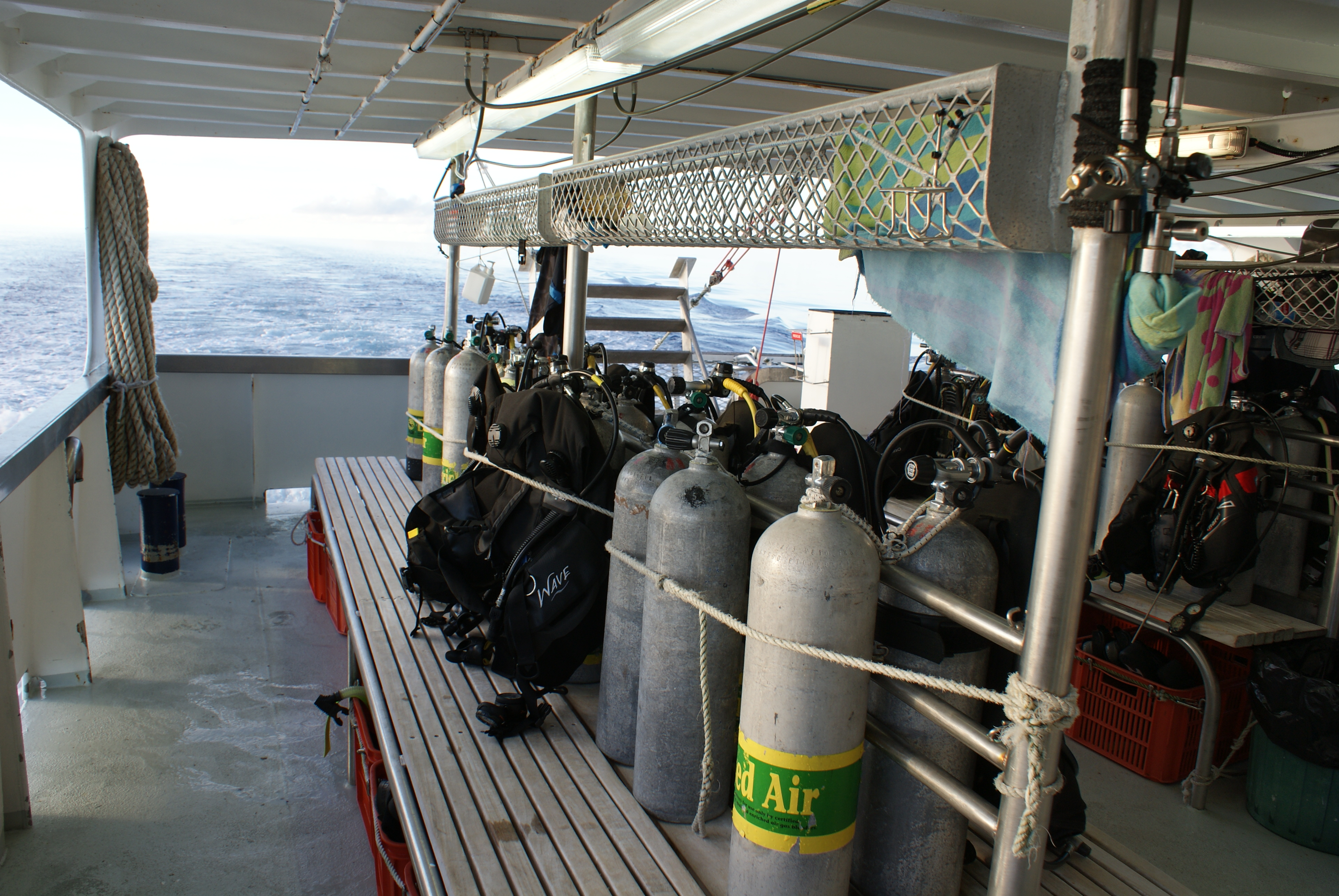
Dive deck of a scuba liveaboard boat in the Great Barrier Reef

In the recreational scuba diving industry, a liveaboard service offers its guests the opportunity to stay aboard for one or more nights, unlike a day boat operation. This allows time to travel to more distant dive sites. Normally, a liveaboard charter caters for between about ten and thirty passengers.

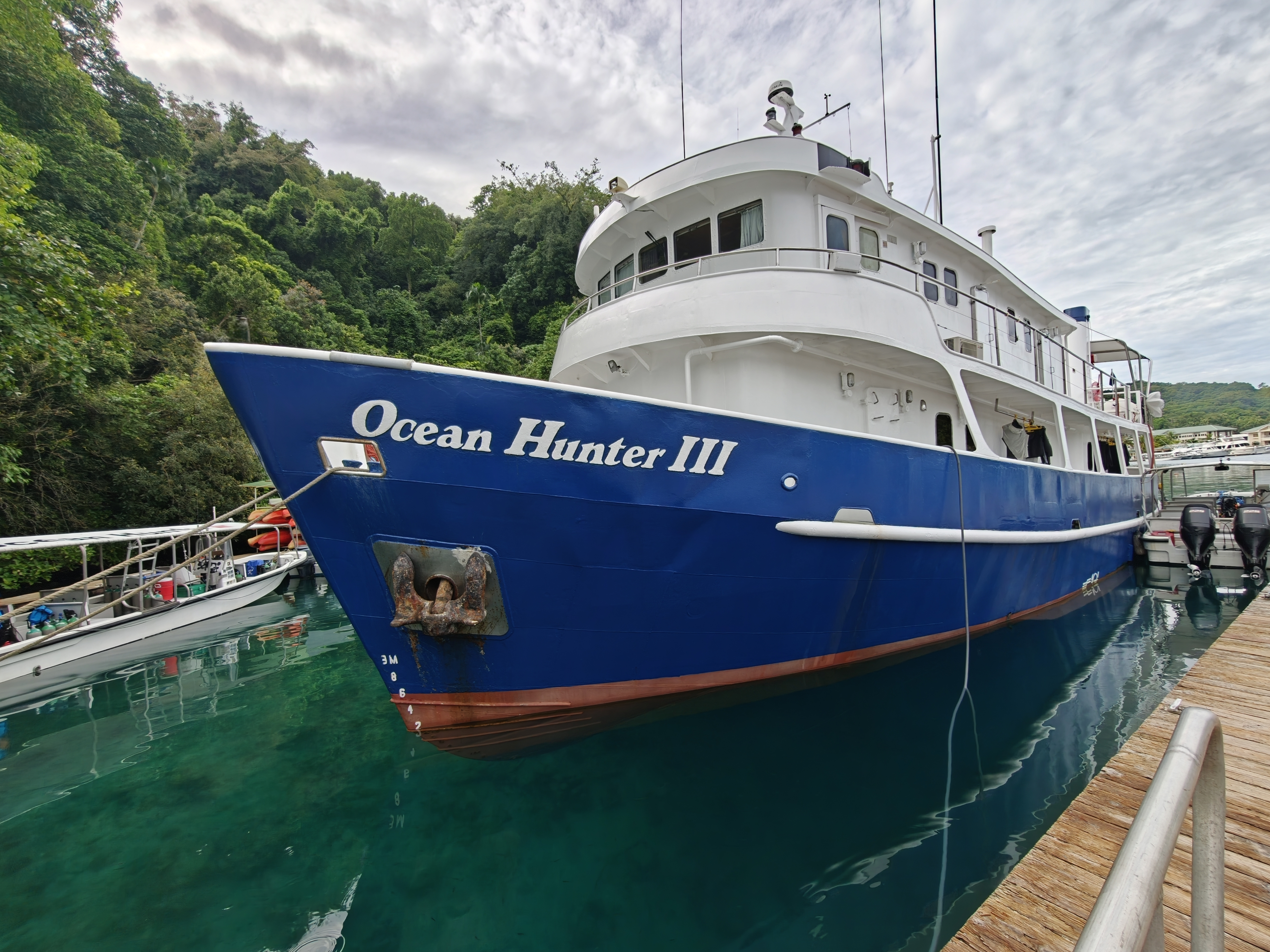
Liveaboard (Ocean Hunter III) Docked at Fish 'n Fins, Koror, Palau

While most liveaboards around the world are usually made with fiber reinforced plastic or steel hulls, in Indonesia, traditional pinisi boats made from teak wood are commonly used.
