= HMS Harpham =

Minesweeper of the Royal Navy

History

United Kingdom
- Name: HMS Harpham
- Namesake: Harpham
- Builder: Jones Slip
- Launched: 14 September 1954
- Completed: 22 December 1954
- Fate: Transferred to Libya 1962

Libya
- Name: Brak
- Acquired: 1962
- Fate: Broken up 1973

General characteristics
- Class & type: Ham class minesweeper
- Type: Minesweeper
- Displacement: 120 long tons (122 t) standard; 164 long tons (167 t) full load
- Length: 100 ft (30 m) p/p; 106 ft 6 in (32.46 m) o/a
- Beam: 21 ft 4 in (6.50 m)
- Draught: 5 ft 6 in (1.68 m)
- Propulsion: 2 shaft Paxman 12YHAXM diesels; 1,100 bhp (820 kW)
- Speed: 14 knots (16 mph; 26 km/h)
- Complement: 2 officers, 13 ratings
- Armament: 1 × Bofors 40 mm L/60 gun or Oerlikon 20 mm cannon
- Notes: Pennant number(s): M2634 / IMS36

HMS Harpham was one of 93 ships of the Ham-class of inshore minesweepers. She was built in 1954 by the Jones Shipyard in Buckie, Moray. She was sold to Libya in 1962 and renamed Brak. She remained in Libyan service until she was broken up in 1973.

Their names were all chosen from villages ending in -ham. The minesweeper was named after Harpham in the East Riding of Yorkshire.
