= Ham-class minesweeper =

1954 class of minesweeper of the Royal Navy

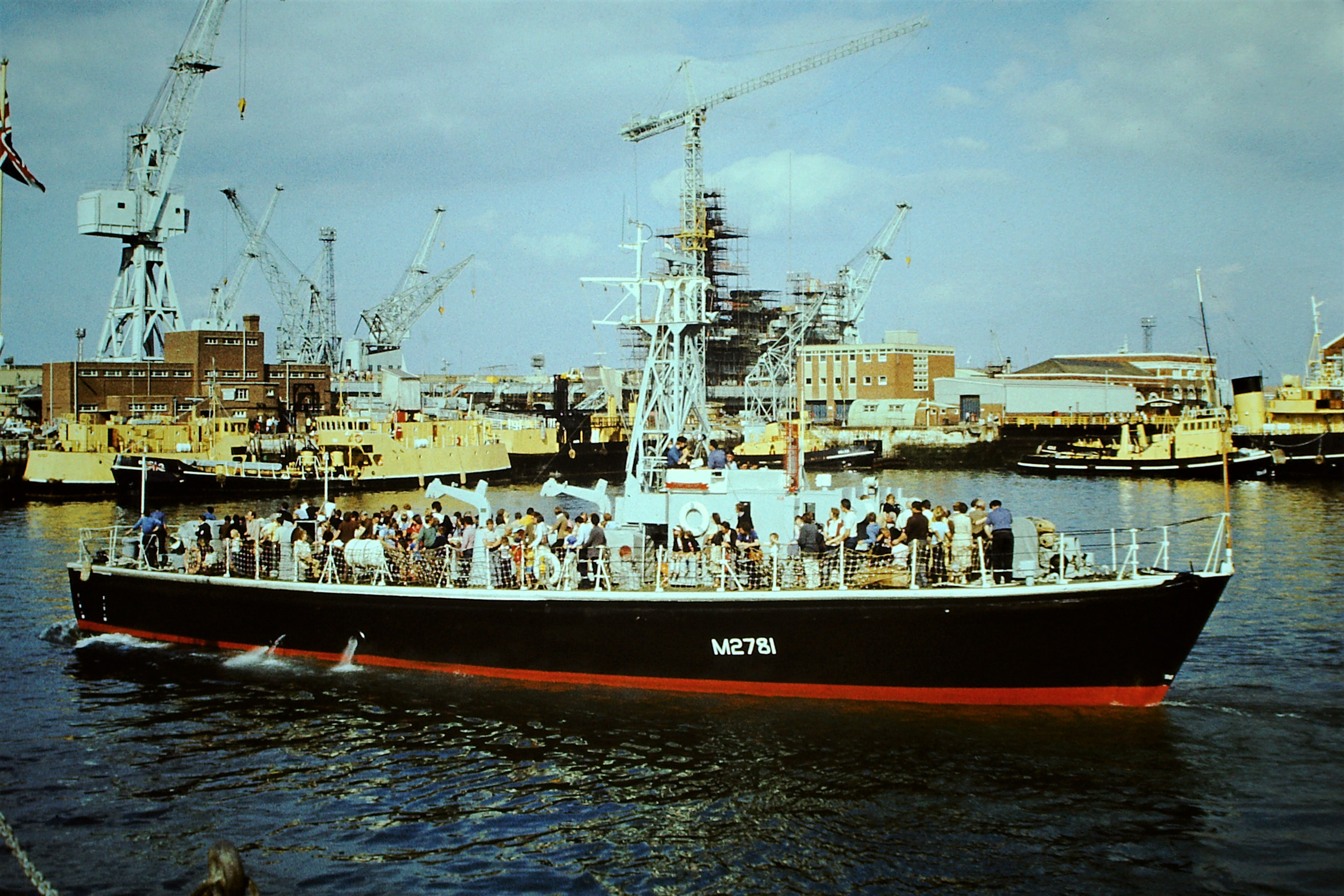
- HMS Portisham

Class overview
- Operators: Royal Navy; Royal Australian Navy; French Navy; Ghana Navy; Libyan Navy; Indian Navy; Royal Malaysian Navy; Royal Saudi Navy; Yugoslav Navy
- Built: 1954–1959
- Completed: 93

General characteristics
- Type: Minesweeper
- Displacement: 120 long tons (122 t) standard; 164 long tons (167 t) full load
- Length: 100 ft (30 m) p/p; 106 ft 6 in (32.46 m) o/a, except third sub-group 107 ft 6 in (32.77 m)
- Beam: 26-group: 21 ft 4 in (6.50 m); 27-group: 22 ft (6.7 m)
- Draught: 26-group: 5 ft 6 in (1.68 m); 27-group: 5 ft 9 in (1.75 m)
- Propulsion: 2 shaft Paxman 12YHAXM diesels; 1,100 bhp (820 kW)
- Speed: 14 knots (26 km/h; 16 mph)
- Range: 15 tons diesel fuel, ?
- Complement: 2 officers, 13 ratings
- Armament: 1 × Bofors 40 mm L/60 gun or Oerlikon 20 mm cannon

The Ham class was a class of inshore minesweepers (IMS), known as the Type 1, of the British Royal Navy. The class was designed to operate in the shallow water of rivers and estuaries. All of the ships in the class are named for British place names that end with -"ham". The parent firm that was responsible for supervising construction was Samuel White of Cowes, Isle of Wight.

== Description ==
The class consisted of 93 ships, launched between 1954 and 1959. HMS Inglesham was the first. They were built in three slightly different sub-groups, the first sub-group, the 26-group, is distinguished by pennant numbers 26xx, and the second and third sub-groups, the 27-group, are distinguished by pennant numbers 27xx. The 26-group was of wood and non-ferrous metal composite construction and the 27-group was of all-wood construction. The third sub-group is distinguished by a prominent rubbing strake around the hull and slightly larger dimensions.

The vessels displaced 164 long tons (167 t) fully laden and were armed with one 40 mm Bofors or 20 mm Oerlikon gun. They were 32.5 metres (107 ft) long overall with a 6.4-metre (21 ft) beam. The construction was of wood to minimise the magnetic signature. The crew complement was 15, rising to 22 in wartime.

The engines of this class were Paxman diesels, some of which were built under licence by Ruston and Hornsby of Lincoln. Each vessel had: two 12YHAXM (intercooled) for main propulsion, rated at 550 bhp (410 kW) at 1,000 rpm, plus one 12YHAZ for pulse generation. Maximum speed was 14 knots (26 km/h; 16 mph) dropping to 9 knots (17 km/h; 10 mph) when mine hunting.

The class shared the same basic hull as the Ley-class minehunter and the Echo-class inshore survey craft.

== Ships ==
- HMS Abbotsham (IMS87)
- HMS Altham (IMS02)
- HMS Arlingham (IMS03)
- HMS Asheldham (IMS04)
- HMS Bassingham (IMS05)
- HMS Bedham (IMS06)
- HMS Birdham (IMS85)
- HMS Bisham (IMS07)
- HMS Blunham (IMS08)
- HMS Bodenham (IMS09)
- HMS Boreham (IMS10)
- HMS Bottisham (IMS11)
- HMS Brantingham (IMS12) (later HMMS Temasek)
- HMS Brigham (IMS13)
- HMS Bucklesham (IMS14)
- HMS Cardinham (IMS15)
- HMS Chelsham (IMS16)
- HMS Chillingham (IMS17)
- HMS Cobham (IMS18)
- HMS Cranham (IMS19)
- HMS Damerham (IMS31)
- HMS Darsham (IMS21)
- HMS Davenham (IMS22)
- HMS Dittisham (IMS23)
- HMS Downham (IMS24)
- HMS Edlingham (IMS25)
- HMS Elsenham (IMS26)
- HMS Etchingham (IMS27)
- HMS Everingham (IMS28)
- HMS Felmersham (IMS29)
- HMS Flintham (IMS30)
- HMS Fordham (IMS54)
- HMS Frettenham (IMS20)
- HMS Fritham (IMS32)
- HMS Georgeham (IMS88)
- HMS Glentham (IMS33)
- HMS Greetham (IMS34)
- HMS Halsham (IMS35)
- HMS Harpham (IMS36)
- HMS Haversham (IMS37)
- HMS Hildersham (IMS42)
- HMS Hovingham (IMS39)
- HMS Inglesham (IMS01)
- HMS Isham (IMS40)
- HMS Kingham (IMS41)
- HMS Lasham (IMS38)
- HMS Ledsham (IMS43) (burnt to hull, London 2017)
- HMS Littleham (IMS44)
- HMS Ludham (IMS45)
- HMS Malham (IMS89)
- HMS Mersham (IMS46)
- HMS Mickleham (IMS47)
- HMS Mileham (IMS48)
- HMS Neasham (IMS49)
- HMS Nettleham (IMS50)
- HMS Ockham (IMS51)
- HMS Odiham (IMS83)
- HMS Ottringham (IMS52)
- HMS Pagham (IMS53)
- HMS Petersham (IMS55)
- HMS Pineham (IMS56)
- HMS Polsham (IMS92)
- HMS Popham (IMS82)
- HMS Portisham (IMS81)
- HMS Powderham (IMS57) (later HMS Waterwitch)
- HMS Pulham (IMS58)
- HMS Puttenham (IMS84)
- HMS Rackham (IMS59)
- HMS Rampisham (IMS86)
- HMS Reedham (IMS60)
- HMS Rendlesham (IMS61)
- HMS Riplingham (IMS62)
- HMS Sandringham (IMS91)
- HMS Saxlingham (IMS64)
- HMS Shipham (IMS63)
- HMS Shrivenham (IMS65)
- HMS Sidlesham (IMS66) (beached and abandoned, Battersea London 2017)
- HMS Sparham (IMS68)
- HMS Stedham (IMS67)
- HMS Sulham (IMS69)
- HMS Thakeham (IMS70)
- HMS Thatcham (IMS90)
- HMS Thornham
- HMS Tibenham (IMS71)
- HMS Tongham (IMS72)
- HMS Tresham (IMS73)
- HMS Warmingham (IMS74)
- HMS Wexham (IMS75)
- HMS Whippingham (IMS76)
- HMS Wintringham (IMS77)
- HMS Woldingham (IMS78)
- HMS Wrentham (IMS79)
- HMS Yaxham (IMS80) (later HMS Woodlark)

In 1964 Ten of the vessels were allocated to the Royal Naval Auxiliary Service

Name	Call sign	Pennant No	Completed	Builders	Joined RNXS	Disposal
Birdham		M.2785	5-Mar-57	J.Taylor	1964	May 1980 - Arrived Great Wakering, Essex for Breaking
Odiham		M.2783	27-Jul-56	Vospers	1964	1978 - on disposal list., May 1980 sold to Sutton & Smith, Great Wakering, Essex
Pagham		M.2716	22-Mar-56	Jones, Buckie	1964	to 1974.1982, RNR Tender
Portisham	GTDG	M.2781	26-Mar-56	Dorset Yacht	1964	to 1983 at HMS Vernon, Portsmouth
Puttenham		M.2784	9-May-58	Thorneycroft	1964	to 1978 at Plymouth
Saxlingham		M.2727	29-Jan-57	Berthon Boat	1964	to 1965. Approved to scrap 1966. 2 May 1968 sold to Ross & Cromarty CC for Lewis Sea School
Shipham	MTMW	M.2726	3-Feb-56	Brooke Marine	1964	to 1983 at Gillingham
Shrivenham		M.2728	11-Aug-56	Bolson	1964	to 1965. For disposal in 1966. Sold to PLA, 21 Feb 1969. Approved to scrap 1966. 2 May 1968 sold to Ross & Cromarty CC for Lewis Sea School
Thakeham	GTJC	M.2733	15-Nov-57	Fairlee Yacht	1964	to 1978. 1979 for disposal
Tongham		M.2735	18-Jun-57	J.Miller	1964	to 1978, also PAS. 1979 for disposal

== See also ==
Equivalent minesweepers of the same era

- Van Straelen class
- Atada class
- Sasha class
