= Ley-class minehunter =

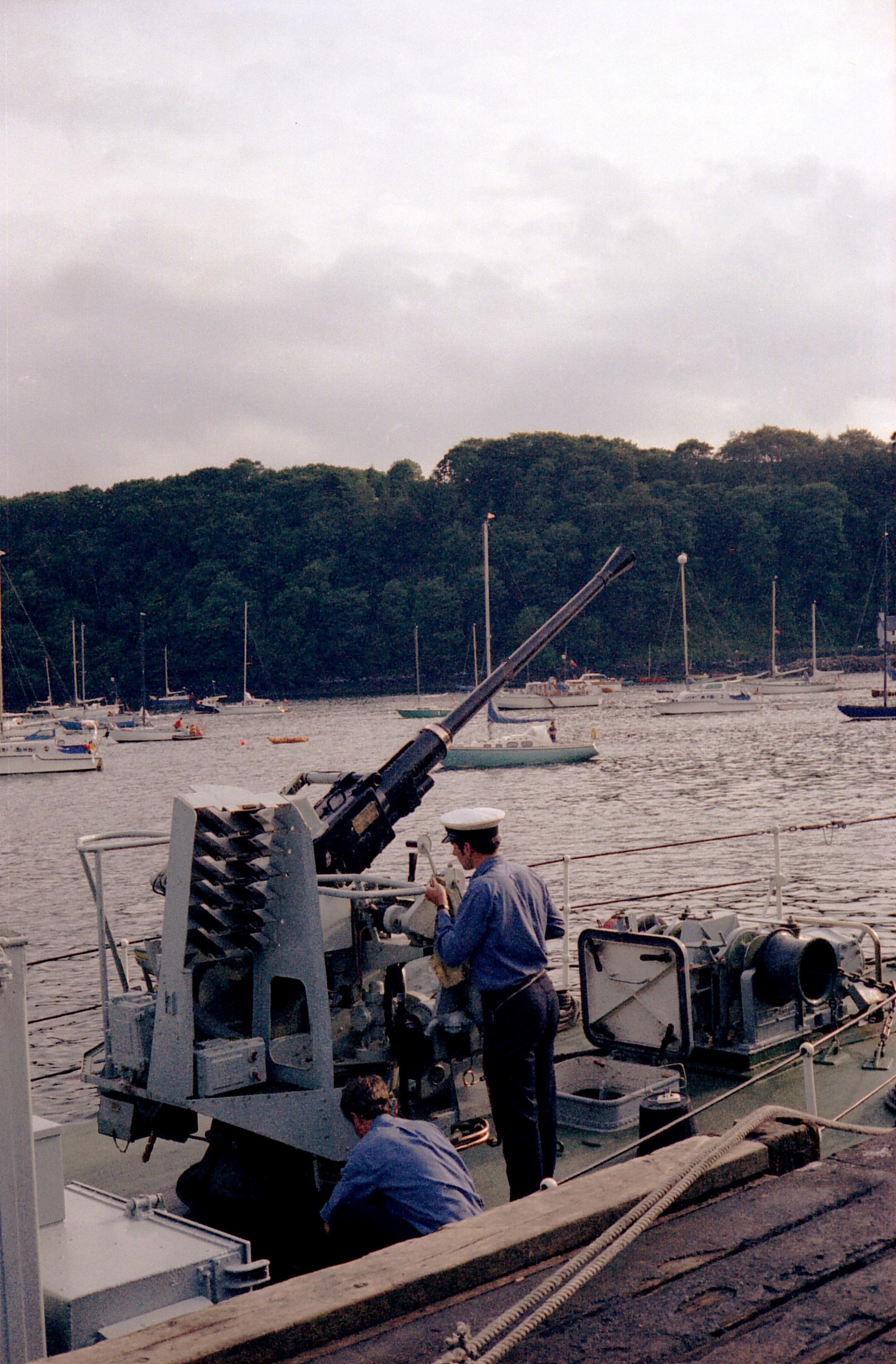
- Bofors gun on HMS Isis (1978)

Class overview
- Name: Ley class
- Operators: Royal Navy
- Built: 1952–1955
- Completed: 11

General characteristics
- Type: Minehunter
- Displacement: 123 long tons (125 t) standard; 164 long tons (167 t) full load
- Length: 100 ft (30 m) p/p
- Beam: 21 ft 4 in (6.50 m)
- Draught: 5 ft 6 in (1.68 m)
- Propulsion: 2 shaft Paxman diesels, 700 bhp (522 kW)
- Speed: 13 knots (15 mph; 24 km/h)
- Complement: 2 officers, 13 ratings
- Armament: 1 × Bofors 40 mm gun or Oerlikon 20 mm cannon

The Ley class was a class of inshore minehunter built for the Royal Navy in the mid-1950s. They had pennant numbers in the series M2001. Eleven ships were built in the early 1950s, most of which were subsequently disarmed and used as training vessels, RNXS tenders, URNU vessels etc.

== Description ==
They were of composite construction, that is, wood and non-ferrous metals, to give a low magnetic signature, important in a vessel that may be dealing with magnetically detonated mines. They displaced 164 tons fully laden, were armed with a Bofors 40 mm gun or an Oerlikon 20 mm gun and were powered by a pair of Paxman diesel engines.

The class shared the same basic hull as their inshore minesweeper counterpart the Ham class and the Echo-class inshore survey craft.

== Role ==
Unlike traditional minesweepers, they were not equipped for sweeping moored or magnetic mines. Their work was to locate individual mines and neutralise them. This was a new role at that point, and the class was configured for working in the shallow water of rivers, estuaries and shipping channels.

== Ships ==
Name	Hull No.	Completed	Out of service	Notes
HMS Aveley	M2002	3 February 1954	1982	To Woolworth Sea Cadet Corps
HMS Brearley	M2003	15 April 1954	1969	Scrapped
HMS Brenchley	M2004	22 September 1954	1966	Sold
HMS Brinkley	M2005	3 November 1954	1965	Sold
HMS Broadley	M2006	12 September 1954	1959	Scrapped
HMS Broomley	M2007	5 August 1954	1966	Scrapped
HMS Burley	M2008	29 June 1954	1966	Scrapped
HMS Chailey	M2009	7 January 1955	1969	Sold for scrap
HMS Cradley	M2010	5 May 1955	1982	Sold
HMS Dingley	M2001	22 August 1955	1967	Sold for scrap
