= Duke (surname) =

Origin
- Meaning: "leader"; possibly derived from "follower of Maedoc"
- Region of origin: England, Ireland

Other names
- Variant form: Dukes

Duke is a surname meaning 'the leader' or 'son of Marmaduke'. It is the 856th most common surname in the United States.

== Etymology ==
The first is that the surname Duke and its variant, Dukes, are both derived from the various Middle English words duc, duk, and douc, which all came from the Old French word "duc." This ultimately stemmed from the Latin dux, meaning "leader," and is a derivative of ducere, "to lead." The surname was evidently acquired by someone who was looked upon as a leader, not denoting one of noble birth since many captains or military leaders were titled landholders who would have taken their last names from their estates. The surname Dukes translates literally as "Duke's son."

Alternatively, it has been suggested by scholars that the surname is simply a shortened form of Marmaduke, which is from the Irish Maelmaedoc, meaning 'servant of Maedoc.' St Maedoc was a Christian missionary in 7th Century Wales and Ireland. As a Plantation surname, it can be found primarily in east Ulster and has been Gaelicised as Diúc.

References date back to the late twelfth century, with Herbert le Duc, a member of the Knights Templar, using the Gallicized version of the name. From 1190 to 1191, Roger le Duc was Sheriff of London, and three generations of his family succeeded him in this office. The Pipe rolls for Berkshire refer to Adam Duke in the year 1198, and in 1214 one Henry Dukes is recorded in the Curia Regis rolls for Warwickshire.

Finally, there is an alternate version of the name that stems from a deviation of the surname “Duck” which is ultimately derived from an incorrect anglicisation of Ó’Leocháin, Ó’Lothcháin, or Úa Lothcháin. Modern day residents of Counties Longford, Westmeath and Roscommon in Ireland hold the name Duke derived from this root. This modern day area is roughly approximate to the area controlled by the Ua Lothcain Sept of the Gailenga Móra in Gaelic Ireland.

== Dukes ==
Dukes
Origin
- Origin: English, Norman
- Meaning: derived from Son or Descendant of Duke, meaning Leader
- Region of origin: England

Other names
- Variant forms: Duke, Dukeson

Dukes is a patronymic form of the surname Duke that originated in medieval England, of Anglo-Norman origin. The meaning is derived from son or descendant of Duke, which was originally recorded le Duc, a term used to mean "leader" before it became associated with a specific rank of the nobility. It is an uncommon name; the 2000 United States Census showed it to be the 1,577th most popular surname, while the United Kingdom Census of that same year showed it to be the 1,749th most popular.

=== Earliest usage ===
The earliest recorded uses of the surname include:

- Ralph or Radulphus Dux in 1199, Buckinghamshire,
- Arnold de Dukes in 1200, Cambridgeshire,
- Henry or Henricus Dukes in 1214, Warwickshire.

== History ==
Records indicate name-holders came to England during and in the decades following the Norman Conquest, but its usage became more common in the reign of Richard I and especially in the time of King John. In Queen Elizabeth’s long reign the surname often appeared among the rolls of her ennobled subjects who were prominently mentioned in the annals of her time.

Duke families were also found very early in Ireland. According to O’Hart's Irish Pedigrees, Vol. II, some were residing in County Westmeath in the Fifteenth century. The will of one William Duke, of Kyllenagh, Kildare, recorded 1551, is found in the records at Dublin. After this early date, the family name appears with more or less variation in form, and with increasing frequency upon the pages of the Irish Public Records. Hanna, in his Scotch-Irish Families of Ulster, estimates that there were in 1890 within the province of Ulster 268 persons bearing the name Duke.

Thus the Dukes were one of the ancient families of England and of Ireland. They are among the earliest recorded by Burke in his pedigrees of the nobility and of the landed gentry. The first mention made of them by this authority was the aforementioned Roger le Duc, sheriff of London. The names of Duke and Dukes have been well-established in the Americas, with one of the earliest arrivals to New England being one Captain Edward Duke in 1634. Humphrey Dukes sailed to Barbados with his wife and servants in 1630.

== Notable people named Duke ==
- Duke (Cambridgeshire cricketer), given name unknown, active 1831
- Annie Duke (born 1965), American poker player
- Basil W. Duke, Confederate general
- Benjamin Newton Duke, (1855–1929) American tobacco philanthropist
- Bill Duke (born 1943), African-American actor and director
- Bryce Duke, (born 2001), American soccer player
- Charles Moss Duke Jr. (born 1935), American astronaut
- David Duke (born 1950), American white-nationalist activist
- David Duke, (born 1978), Scottish footballer
- Donald Duke, former governor of Nigeria
- Doris Duke (1912–1993), American philanthropist
- Doris Duke (soul singer) (1941–2019), African-American gospel and soul singer
- Dylan Duke (born 2003), American ice hockey player
- Edmund Duke (1563–1590), English Catholic martyr
- Edward Duke (1779–1852), English antiquary
- Geoff Duke, English champion road racer
- George Duke (1946–2013), African-American singer-songwriter and musician
- George Duke (footballer) (1920–1988), English footballer
- Henry Duke, 1st Baron Merrivale, judge and Chief Secretary for Ireland 1916–1918
- James A. Duke (1929–2017), American botanist
- James Buchanan Duke (1856–1925), American entrepreneur and philanthropist
- James "Red" Duke (1928–2015), American surgeon
- Jas H. Duke (1939–1992), Australian writer
- Jessamyn Duke (born 1986), American mixed martial artist
- John Woods Duke (1899–1984), American composer and pianist
- Kacy Duke, American fitness instructor and life coach
- Ken Duke (born 1969), American golfer
- Khalid Duke (born 2001), American football player
- Lynne Duke (1956–2013), American journalist and writer
- Matt Duke, English footballer
- Mike Duke, American business executive
- Mitchell Duke (born 1991), Australian soccer player
- Norm Duke, American bowler
- Patty Duke (1946–2016), American actress
- P. J. Duke (1925–1950), former Cavan Gaelic footballer
- Raoul Duke, alter-ego to Hunter S. Thompson, used as both a character and a pen name
- Robert Duke, songwriter pseudonym of Joe Meek
- Robin Duke, Canadian actress and comedian
- Roby Duke (1956–2007), American musician
- Steve Duke, American saxophonist
- Vernon Duke, Russian composer and songwriter
- Walter Duke, American politician
- Washington Duke (1820–1905), American entrepreneur
- Wesley Duke, former American football player
- William Duke, Scottish lieutenant governor of Bengal
- Zach Duke, American baseball player

== Notable people named Dukes ==
- Alan Dukes (born 1945), Irish politician
- Ashley Dukes (1885–1959), English playwright
- Ben Dukes, American independent Country music singer
- Bill J. Dukes, American politician
- Brandon Dukes, American politician
- Carol Muske-Dukes, American author and poet
- Chad Dukes (American football), former NFL and Arena Football player
- Chad Dukes (radio personality), co-host of the Big O and Dukes Show
- Charlene Dukes, American academic administrator
- Cuthbert Dukes (1890–1977), English pathologist
- Daragh Dukes, musician and producer of Irish rock band Headgear
- David Dukes (1945–2000), American stage and TV actor
- Derrick Dukes, African-American wrestler
- Elijah Dukes, African-American baseball player
- Gordon Dukes (1888–1966), American track and field athlete
- Harry Dukes (1912–1988), English footballer
- Hazel Nell Dukes (1932–2025), American anti-racism activist
- Jamie Dukes, former professional football player and NFL Network analyst
- Joanna Dukes, English actress
- Kevin Dukes, American guitarist
- Leopold Dukes (1810–1891), Hungarian historian of Jewish literature
- Mike Dukes (1936–2008), American football player
- Paul Dukes (1889–1967), English journalist and MI6 officer
- Philip Dukes (born 1968), English classical viola soloist
- Ramsey Dukes, pseudonym of occultist Lionel Snell
- Rob Dukes, lead singer for American metal band Exodus
- Tom Dukes, American baseball player
- Walter Dukes (1930–2001), African-American basketball player

== See also ==
- Duke (disambiguation)
- Duke (given name)
- Duke (nickname)
