= Duke (disambiguation) =

A duke is an aristocrat of very high rank.

Duke or The Duke commonly refers to:

- Duke University, a private research university in Durham, North Carolina

Duke or The Duke may also refer to:

== Places ==
- Duke, Missouri, an unincorporated community
- Duke (Kiseljak), a village in Bosnia and Herzegovina
- Duke Township, Harnett County, North Carolina
- Duke Township, Jackson County, Oklahoma; see List of Oklahoma townships
- (The) Duke City, a nickname for Albuquerque, New Mexico
- Duke Island (Alaska)
- La Duke Island, Nunavut, Canada

== People ==
- Duke (nickname), a list of people
- Duke (given name), a list of people
- Duke (surname), including a list of people

== Fictional characters ==
- Bo, Luke, Daisy and Jesse Duke from the American television series
- Edmund Duke (StarCraft)
- Duke (G.I. Joe), from the G.I. Joe TV series, toy line and comic book series
- Uncle Duke, from Doonesbury
- Tony "Duke" Evers, in the Rocky films
- Duke Lavery, on the American soap opera General Hospital
- Duke, from KOF: Maximum Impact
- Duke, a narrow-gauge engine created by Rev W Awdry in The Railway Series and Thomas & Friends
- Duke of New York, aka "The Duke, A Number One", gang leader in Escape from New York
- Duke Nukem (character), the protagonist in over a dozen video games
- Duke, protagonist of the eponymous novel by Hal Ellson
- Duke, the family dog in the television series The Beverly Hillbillies
- Duke, an anthropomorphic dog with a southern accent in the comic Kelly & Duke
- Duke, a golden retriever in commercials of Tennessee food producer Bush Brothers and Company (Bush's Baked Beans)
- Duke, the dog from Barnyard (film)
- Duke, a dog from The Secret Life of Pets
- Duke Forrest, from the film version of M*A*S*H
- Duke, a POW from the play and film Stalag 17
- Duke Oda, the player in the game Cyber Police ESWAT
- Duke Caboom, in Toy Story 4

== Sports ==
- Duke Blue Devils, the athletic teams of Duke University
- The Duke (horse), a 19th-century racing champion
- "The Duke", the official nickname of the game ball used in the National Football League of American football

== In business ==
- TVNZ Duke, a New Zealand television channel
- Dukes Aerospace, a valve manufacturer and subsidiary of TransDigm Group
- Duke Energy, a producer of gas and electric services in the US
- Dukes Hotel, a luxury hotel in London
- Duke Realty, a real estate investment trust in the US
- Duke Records, an American record label active from 1952 to 1973
- Duke and Sons, an Indian former drink manufacturing company

== In the military ==
- HMS Duke, various ships and a shore establishment of the Royal Navy
- Duke Field, a US Air Force airport in Florida
- Forward Operating Base Duke, a former US base in Iraq

== Transportation ==
- Beechcraft Duke, a twin-engined airplane developed by Beechcraft in the 1960s and manufactured until 1983
- Duke motorcycles, such as the KTM 690 Duke and the KTM 390 Duke
- The Duke, a short-lived 0-6-0 steam locomotive built in 1817 by George Stephenson for the Kilmarnock and Troon Railway
- GWR 3252 Class, or Duke Class, steam locomotive
- Duta–Ulu Klang Expressway (DUKE), an expressway in Klang Valley, Malaysia

== Technology ==
- Duke (mascot), the mascot of the Java programming language
- Duke, an electronic countermeasure (jammer) specifically designed for radio-controlled improvised explosive devices (RCIED)
- Xbox Controller, often nicknamed the Duke

== Entertainment ==
=== Film ===
- The Duke (TV series), 1954
- The Duke (1998 film), a 1998 short film
- The Duke (1999 film), a 1999 Disney film
- Duke (film), a 2019 crime drama
- The Duke (2020 film), a 2020 comedy-drama film

=== Television shows and episodes ===
- The Duke (miniseries), 1979
- The Duke (TV talk show), 2009, for men by AXN Asia
- "The Duke", a 2010 episode of the animated TV series Adventure Time

== Music ==
=== Musicians ===
- Duke Ellington, American jazz pianist, composer and arranger
- Duke Special, Northern Irish singer-songwriter
- Duke (musician), British singer/songwriter/composer/producer
- Rich Ward, guitarist of metal band Fozzy whose stage name is "The Duke"
- MC Duke, a British rapper

=== Albums ===
- Duke (album) (1980), by Genesis
- The Duke (Jørn Lande album) (2006), by Jørn Lande
- The Duke (Joe Jackson album) (2012)

=== EPs ===
- The Duke (EP) (2016) by Lamb of God

=== Songs ===
- "The Duke" (song), a 2016 single by Lamb of God
- "The Duke", a 1957 jazz standard penned by Dave Brubeck
- "The Duke", by Blind Melon from Soup

== Literature ==
- Duke (magazine), a defunct African-American men's magazine
- Duke, a 1949 novel by Hal Ellson

== Other uses ==
- Duke language, an Oceanic language
- Duke (Lombard), a type of political and military commander of the Lombards in the 5th–8th centuries
- Duke butterflies, a species of the brush-footed butterfly genera
- The Duke (board game)
- Duke, an old English paper size measuring 7×5.5 inches (178×140 mm)
- TVNZ Duke, a New Zealand television channel

== See also ==
- Dukes (disambiguation)
