= HMS Duke =

Seven ships and a shore establishment of the Royal Navy have been called HMS Duke:

- HMS Duke (1652) was a 12-gun ship in service in 1652.
- HMS Duke (1682) was a 90-gun second rate launched in 1682. She was rebuilt in 1701 and renamed HMS Prince George. She was accidentally burnt in 1758.
- HMS Duke was a 90-gun second rate launched in 1678 as HMS Vanguard. She sank in 1703 but was raised in 1704 and rebuilt between 1705 and 1710. She was renamed HMS Duke in 1728 and was broken up in 1733 for rebuilding, being re-launched in 1739 and serving until broken up in 1769.
- HMS Duke (1739) was an 8-gun fireship purchased in 1739 (not to be confused with the above-mentioned second rate re-launched in the same year) and expended at St Tropez in 1742.
- HMS Duke (1745) was an 8-gun fireship captured from the French in 1745 and sold in 1748.
- HMS Duke (1761) was a 10-gun storeship which foundered in 1761 off Pondicherry.
- HMS Duke (1777) was a 90-gun second rate launched in 1777 and relegated to harbour service in 1799. She was broken up in 1843.
- HMS Duke (shore establishment) was a training establishment in Malvern, Worcestershire between 1941 and 1946, later becoming the Royal Radar Establishment.

== See also ==
- HMS Duke of Edinburgh
- HMS Duke of Kent
- HMS Duke of Gloucester
- HMS Duke of Wellington
- HMS Duke of York
- HMS Duke William
- HMS Iron Duke
- * Type 23 frigate, also known as the Duke class, in service with the Royal Navy since 1987
