= DUCS =

DUCS or Ducs may refer to:

== Sport ==
- Ducs d'Angers, a French ice hockey team
- Ducs de Dijon, a French ice hockey team
- Ducs de Longueuil, a Canadian junior baseball team

== Other uses ==
- DUCS (software) or Display Unit Control System
- Dept. of Computer Science, University of Delhi, India
- Ducs Decazes, a French nobleman

== See also ==
- DUC (disambiguation)
- Duck (disambiguation)
- Dukes (disambiguation)
