= Dukes (disambiguation) =

Dukes are titles and office of nobility.

Dukes or The Dukes may refer to:

== Arts and entertainment ==
=== Film and television ===
- The Dukes (TV series), a 1983 animated spinoff of The Dukes of Hazzard
- The Dukes (film), a 2007 film starring Chazz Palminteri

=== Music ===
- The Dukes (Australian band), a 1990s rock band
- The Dukes (British band), a 1970s rock band featuring Miller Anderson and Jimmy McCulloch, or their 1979 album
- The Dukes (British duo), a blue-eyed soul duo active 1981–82
- The Dukes (New Zealand band), a rock band formed in 2003
- Steve Earle & the Dukes, American band formed in the 1970s

=== Fictional characters ===
- Fred J. Dukes, Marvel Comics supervillain the Blob
- Oliver Dukes, primary antagonist in Maurice Walsh's 1950 novel Trouble in the Glen and its 1954 film adaptation

== Sports teams ==
- Albuquerque Dukes, a former Triple A baseball team based in Albuquerque, New Mexico, United States
- Duluth-Superior Dukes (1956–70), a minor league baseball team
- Duluth–Superior Dukes (1993–2002 team), a professional baseball team
- Duquesne Dukes, the athletic teams of Duquesne University in Pittsburgh
- James Madison Dukes, the sports teams of James Madison University, Harrisonburg, Virginia, United States
- Ingolstadt Dukes, an American football team from Ingolstadt, Bavaria, Germany
- Wellington Dukes, a Junior "A" ice hockey team from Wellington, Ontario, Canada

== Other uses ==
- Dukes (surname), including a list of people and fictional characters
- Dukes (ward), Sefton, Merseyside, England
- Dukes County, Massachusetts
- The Dukes, Lancaster, formerly known as the Duke's Playhouse, a theatre in Lancaster, England
- Dukes brand cricket ball, manufactured by British Cricket Balls Ltd
- Dukes Creek, Georgia, United States
- Duke's Mayonnaise, a condiment created by Eugenia Duke
- The Dukes, a hacker group more commonly known as Cozy Bear
- Dukes, a fictional borough based on Queens appearing in Grand Theft Auto IV

== See also ==
- Dukes classification, a system for classifying colorectal cancers
- Duke's, an Indian soft drink brand of Duke and Sons
- The Duhks, a Canadian folk band
- Duke (disambiguation)
