= Robert Allan Smith =

British mathematician and physicist

Robert Allan Smith CBE FRS FRSE
- Born: 16 May 1909
- Died: 16 May 1980 (aged 71)
- Education: University of Edinburgh; Emmanuel College, Cambridge
- Spouse: Doris Marguerite Louise Ward
- Children: Joy, Margaret and Alistair
- Scientific career
- Workplaces: Cavendish Laboratory; University of St Andrews; University of Reading; Bawdsey Research Station (BRS); Royal Radar Establishment; University of Sheffield; MIT; Heriot-Watt University

Robert Allan Smith CBE DSc FRS FRSE (14 May 1909 – 16 May 1980) was a British mathematician and physicist.

== Biography ==
Smith (known to his friends as Robin, and more widely as "RA") was born in Kelso on 14 May 1909, the elder of two sons of George J T Smith, a tailor, and his wife, Elisabeth (née Allan), a ladies' dressmaker. His education was initially at local village schools, followed by Kelso High School. In 1926 he entered the University of Edinburgh to study mathematics and natural philosophy, and gained his MA with first-class honours in 1930. He was also awarded a scholarship that took him to Emmanuel College, Cambridge, where he read for the Maths Tripos Part II, obtaining his MA in 1932.

Smith's first research was at the Cavendish Laboratory, where he worked on the theory and experiment of atomic collisions. An extension of this work, with Harrie Massey, led to his first paper, with Massey, in 1933. They then turned their attention to negative ions, and further papers resulted. Smith was awarded his PhD in 1935. After brief spells at the University of St Andrews and the University of Reading, he was engaged in war work. He joined the staff of Bawdsey Research Station (BRS) on the Suffolk coast, working on the Chain Home {CH} network of early warning radar stations.

BRS moved to Dundee at the outbreak of war, and then to Worth Matravers, near Swanage. It was later renamed the Telecommunications Research Establishment, and Smith was now working on beacon navigational systems, and especially Gee. In May 1942 TRE moved yet again, this time to Malvern College. At the end of the war the college's facilities were needed again, and so TRE moved elsewhere in Malvern, to HMS Duke, later becoming the Royal Radar Establishment. Smith's work in the war years was recognised by the award of a CBE in 1960.

In 1961 Smith was invited to become Professor of Physics at the University of Sheffield, but it wasn't a world he felt comfortable in, and he started exploring the idea of going to MIT. The following year he was elected FRS. He then joined MIT and was appointed Director of the Materials Science Center. He was provided with 14 000m^{2} of space for research and teaching, and, by 1967 was in charge of 55 professors, 19 other academic staff and 179 graduate students. "R A 's main contribution was to bring groups of people together and create suitable conditions for collaborative research to flourish".

In 1968 Smith was appointed Principal and Vice-Chancellor of Heriot-Watt University. Before he retired from this post in 1974 he oversaw major expansions in building programmes, the quality and quantity of students and staff, degrees awarded, papers published, new research grants and 12 new Chairs. In recognition of his many achievements Smith was awarded an Honorary DSc in July 1975.

In 1973 Smith was appointed to the Council of the Royal Society of Edinburgh, and in October 1976 was elected its 32nd President, which office which he held until October 1979. He was elected FRSE in 1969.

=== Family ===
Smith met his future wife, Doris Marguerite Louise Ward, through the CICCU. They married in Cambridge on 15 December 1934, and had three children: Joy, Margaret and Alistair.

Robert Allan Smith died on 16 May 1980.

== Books ==
- Radio aids to navigation, Cambridge University Press, 1947
- Aerials for metre and decimetre wave-lengths, Cambridge University Press, 1949
- The physical principles of thermodynamics, Chapman & Hall, 1952
- Detection and measurement of infra-red radiation (with F E Jones and RP Chasmar), Oxford University Press, 1957
- Semiconductors, Cambridge University Press, 1959
- Wave mechanics of crystalline solids, Chapman & Hall, 1961
