= Headgear (disambiguation) =

Headgear is clothing worn on the head.

Headgear may also refer to:

- Headgear (martial arts), a helmet used for martial arts
- Headgear (artist group), a group of Japanese artists and writers
- Orthodontic headgear, an orthodontic appliance

== Music ==
- Headgear (band), a musical project of Daragh Dukes
- Headgear Studio, an American recording studio based in Williamsburg, Brooklyn
- "Headgear", a song from Adam Ant's unreleased Persuasion album

== Other uses ==
- Headgear or headstock/headframe, the winding frame above an underground mine shaft
