= Abubakar Tafawa Balewa University Teaching Hospital =

Hospital in Bauchi, Nigeria

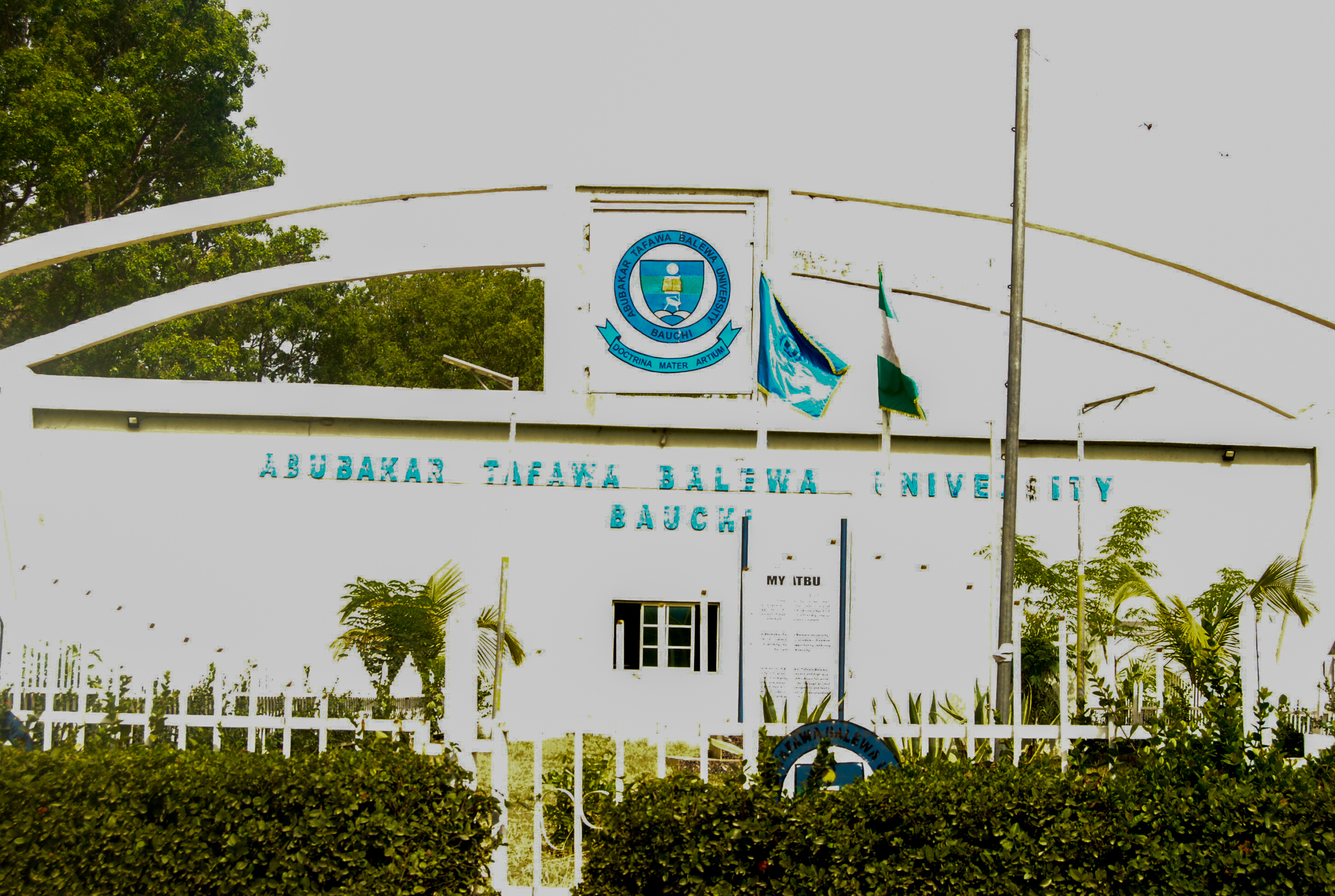

Geography
- Location: Bauchi, Northern, Bauchi State, Nigeria
- Coordinates: 10.32429°N 9.83088°E

Organisation
- Type: General hospital, Teaching and specialist

Services
- Emergency department: Available

History
- Founded: 2010

Links
- Website: https://www.atbuth.gov.ng/

Abubakar Tafawa Balewa University Teaching Hospital is a federal government of Nigeria teaching hospital located in Bauchi, Bauchi State, Nigeria. The current chief medical director is Prof. Yusuf Bara Jibril.

== History ==
Abubakar Tafawa Balewa University Teaching Hospital, was established in 2010. The hospital was formerly known as Specialist Hospital, Bauchi.

== Services and Departments ==
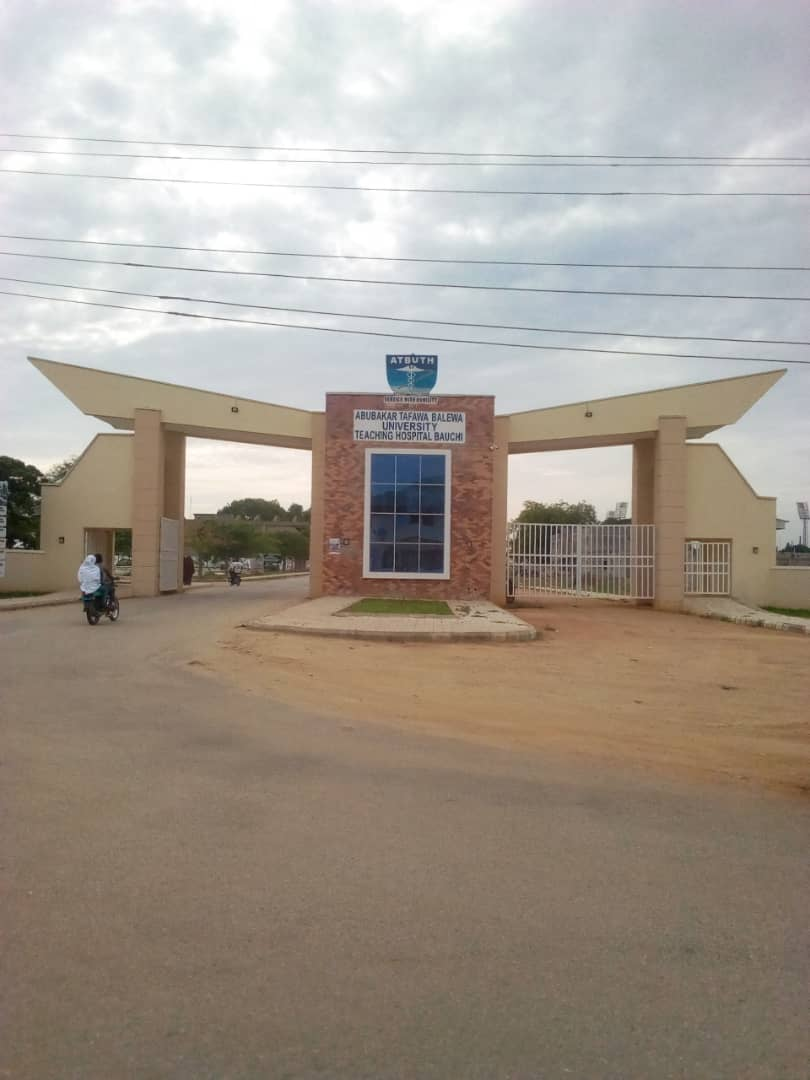
Main Gate of ATBUTH

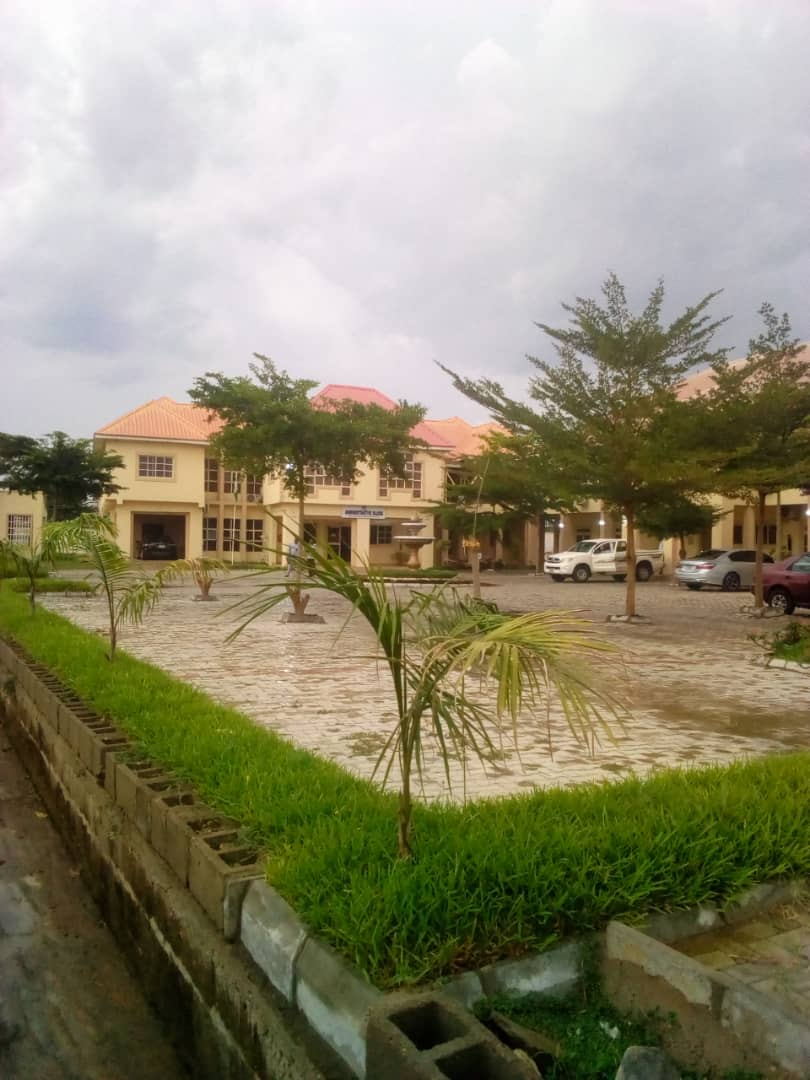
Administrative Block of ATBUTH

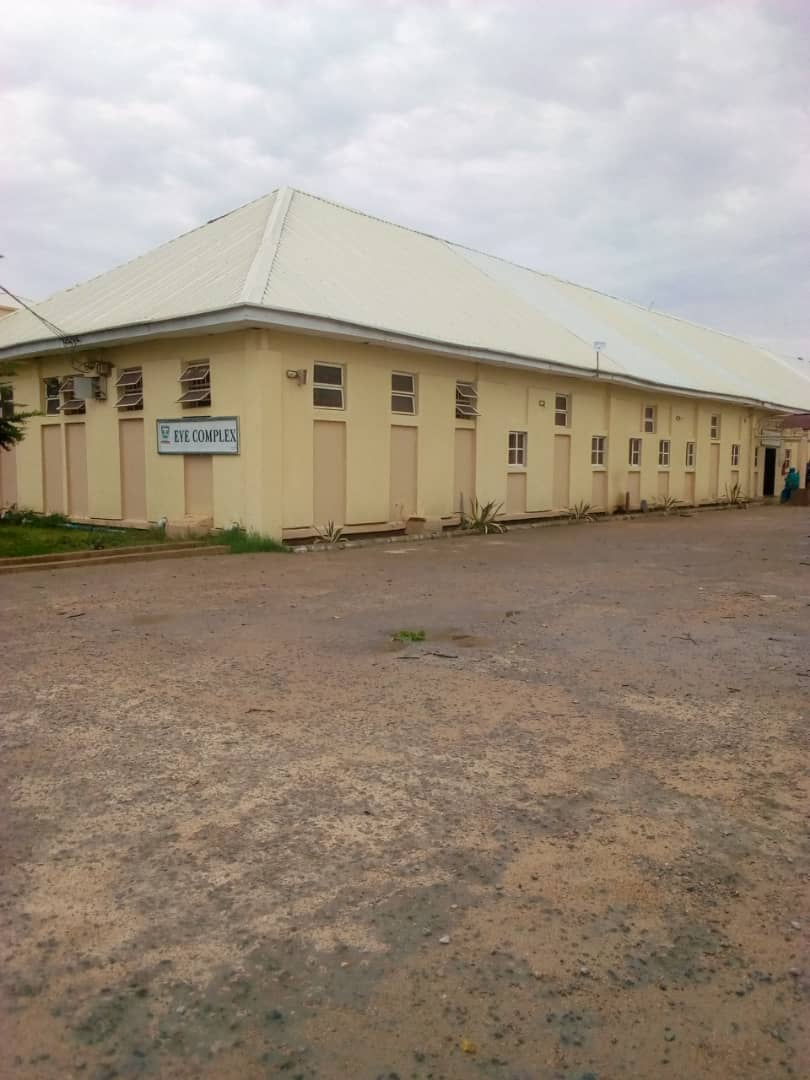
Eye Complex at ATBUTH

ATBUTH offers medical services across various departments:

- Anaesthesia & ICU
- Chemical Pathology
- Community Medicine
- Dental & Maxillofacial Surgery
- Ear, Nose, and Throat (ENT)
- Family Medicine
- Health Information Management
- Haematology & Blood Transfusion
- Histopathology
- Internal Medicine
- Medical Microbiology
- Medical Social Welfare
- Molecular and Infectious Diseases Laboratory
- Nursing Services
- Obstetrics and Gynaecology
- Ophthalmology
- Paediatrics
- Pharmacy
- Physiotherapy
- Psychiatry
- Radiology
- Surgery
- Trauma and Orthopaedics

== CMD ==
The current chief medical director is Yusuf Bara Jibril.

== Commission ==
On the 29th of May 2026, president Bola Ahmed Tinubu commissioned the state-of-the-art Infertility and Assisted Reproductive Technology Centre project in the teaching hospital in other to improve reproductive health care in the teaching hospital and in the region.
