= Duke (nickname) =

Duke or The Duke is a nickname of:

- Duke Aiona (born 1955), American politician
- Duke Brett (1900–1974), American Major League Baseball pitcher (1924–1925) and minor league manager
- Duke Carmel (1937–2021), American former Major League Baseball player
- Duke Cunningham (born 1941), American former US Navy fighter pilot and disgraced politician
- George Deukmejian (1928–2018), former Governor of California
- David Dickinson (born 1941), British antiques expert and television presenter
- Dudu Doukara (born 1991), French-Senegalese footballer
- Michael Dukakis (born 1933), former Governor of Massachusetts and presidential candidate
- Duke Ellington (1899–1974), American jazz composer, pianist and bandleader
- Nathan Ellington (born 1981), English footballer nicknamed "The Duke" after the jazz bandleader
- Duke Erikson (born 1951), American songwriter, producer, musician and co-founder of the alternative rock band Garbage
- Duke Esper (1868–1910), American Major League Baseball pitcher
- Abdul "Duke" Fakir (1935-2024), American singer
- Duke Farrell (1866–1925), American Major League Baseball catcher
- Dušan Fabian (born 1975), Slovak author
- Duke Harris (1942–2017), Canadian former hockey player
- Robert P. Hedman, American pilot, Flying Tigers "ace in a day" (Christmas Day 1941)
- Marmaduke Hussey, Baron Hussey of North Bradley (1923–2006), former Chairman of the Board of Governors of the BBC
- Duke Iversen (1920–2011), American football player
- Duke Jordan (1922–2006), American jazz pianist
- Duke Keats (1895–1972), Canadian hockey player in the National Hockey League and other leagues
- Wellington Mara (1916–2005), American National Football League executive and co-owner of the New York Giants
- Duke Nalon (1913–2001), American race car driver
- Duke Pearson (1932–1980), American jazz pianist, composer and bandleader
- Duke Reid (1915–1975), Jamaican record producer, DJ and label owner
- Duke Robillard (born 1948), American blues musician
- Duke Roufus (born 1970), American former kickboxer and coach
- Duke Shelley (born 1996), American football player
- Duke Sims (born 1941), American retired Major League Baseball catcher
- Duke Slater (1898–1966), African-American college and professional football player, member of the College Football Hall of Fame
- Duke Snider (1926–2011), American Hall of Fame Major League Baseball player
- John Wayne (1907–1979), American actor
- Duke Worne (1888–1933), American silent film director and actor

== See also ==
- Duke (disambiguation)
- Duke (given name)
- Duke (surname)
- Orlando Hernández, Major League Baseball pitcher nicknamed "El Duque"
- Mark Viduka (born 1975), Australian retired soccer player nicknamed "Big Dukes"
