= HMS Wellington =

At least three ships of the Royal Navy have borne the name HMS Wellington:

- The French brig Oreste was renamed HMS Wellington after her capture in 1810 but never commissioned and was broken up in 1812.
- HMS Wellington (1816) was a 74-gun third-rate ship of the line. Initially named Hero during construction, the vessel was renamed first to Wellington and then HMS Akbar in 1861, when the vessel was converted to a training ship. The ship was broken up in 1908.
- HMS Wellington (U65) is a Grimsby-class sloop, launched in 1934. After World War II she was converted to the "Head Quarters Ship" HQS Wellington at Chatham Dockyard and moored at Victoria Embankment, London. Until 2023 she was the floating livery hall of the Honourable Company of Master Mariners.

== See also ==
- HMNZS Wellington (P55)
- HMS Duke of Wellington, at least two ships
- HMS Kellington
- HMS Iron Duke
