= DUC =

Duc or DUC may refer to:

== Military ==
- Distinguished Unit Citation, United States
- Duc Duc massacre, 1971
- Battle of Duc Duc, 1974

== People ==
- Duc, title for Dukes in France
- Dục Đức (1852–1883), emperor of Vietnam
- Tự Đức (1829–1883), emperor of Vietnam
- Thích Quảng Đức (1897–1963), Vietnamese Buddhist monk
- Hélène Duc (1917–2014), French actress
- Catherine Duc (fl. since 2002), Vietnamese-Australian musician

== Places in Vietnam ==
- Thủ Đức, a district of Ho Chi Minh City
- Đức Phổ, a town
- Mộ Đức, capital of Mộ Đức District
- Yên Đức, a village of Đông Triều town

== Technology ==
- Digital up converter, to increase signal sample rate
- Drilled but uncompleted; see Well drilling

== Other uses ==
- D.U.C, a 2015 album by Booba
- Dakar UC, a Senegalese football club
- Bánh đúc, a Vietnamese cake
- Democratic Union for Change, a Kenyan political party
- Halliburton Field (airport), Oklahoma, United States (by IATA and FAA code)

== See also ==
- DUCS (disambiguation)
