= Lionel Snell =

English writer, magician and publisher

- Born: Kings Langley, England

Education
- Education: Cambridge University

Philosophical work
- Era: Contemporary philosophy
- Main interests: Magical thinking Virtual reality
- Notable ideas: Johnstone's paradox
- Website: ramseydukes.co.uk

Lionel Snell is an English writer, magician, and publisher. He has released numerous works on the subjects of magic and philosophy under various pen names, and is most famously known as Ramsey Dukes. He has been described as "an important early contributor to the discussions of occultism in the mid- to late 1970s".

== Career ==
In his youth, Snell received a series of scholarships which eventually allowed him to attend Emmanuel College, Cambridge, where he graduated with a degree in Pure Mathematics.

His writings on the English artist and occultist Austin Osman Spare in Agape Occult Review (1972), and his philosophical theories published in SSOTBME: An Essay on Magic (1974) brought him into contact with the nascent chaos magic movement of the 1970s. Snell was active within this environment for most of the 1970s to the 1980s.

The novel approach to magic which he developed during this period has been described as synthesizing "the works of Crowley, Spare and Carlos Casteneda into a form of magical libertarianism." Due to his contribution in this area, Snell is often regarded as an important figure in the historical emergence of the chaos magic current.

As well as being a theorist of magic, Snell has also been an avid practitioner. In 1977, he claimed to have performed a well-known, but notably laborious and rarely attempted ritual called the Abramelin operation. Later, he engaged with occultist organisations such as Ordo Templi Orientis and Illuminates of Thanateros.

Since 2015, Snell has been running a YouTube channel, which has over a quarter million views as of July 2022.

== Philosophical works ==
=== Words made Flesh ===
Snell’s book Words Made Flesh (1987) takes a philosophical approach to the nature of reality. In this work, Snell outlines his “information model” theory of magic, which entertains the possibility that the universe could be a virtual reality, also known as the simulation hypothesis. According to Steve Collins, this theme was later explored in popular culture through films such as The Matrix.

== Partial bibliography ==
Works include:

- SSOTBME: An Essay on Magic, Its Foundations, Development and Place in Modern Life
  - 1st edition: The Mouse That Spins, 1974. ISBN 0904311015
  - Hardcover: Turner, 1979. ISBN 0904311090
  - SSOTBME has been published in Polish as STCMO: seksualne tajemnice czarnych magów obnażone: esej o magii, jej podstawach, rozwoju i miejscu we współczesnym życiu. Zielony Lew. ISBN 9780904311242
- SSOTBME Revised: An Essay on Magic. The Mouse That Spins, 2002. ISBN 0904311082
- Thundersqueak: The Confessions of a Right Wing Anarchist, with Liz Angerford and Ambrose Lee. The Mouse That Spins. ISBN 0904311120 (3rd rev. ed., 2003)
- Words Made Flesh, Mouse That Spins. ISBN 0904311112 (2nd rev. ed., 2003)
- BLAST Your Way to Megabuck$ with my SECRET Sex-Power Formula. The Mouse That Spins. ISBN 0904311139 (2nd rev. ed., 2003)
  - BLAST... has been published in German as Zaster-Blaster, Zapp Dir den Weg zum GiGaGeld mit meiner GEHEIMEN SEX-KRAFT-FORMEL. ISBN 3890942717
- The Good, the Bad the Funny, with Adamai Philotunus. The Mouse That Spins, 2002. ISBN 0904311104
- What I Did in My Holidays: Essays on Black Magic, Satanism, Devil Worship and Other Niceties. Mandrake Press Ltd, 1999. ISBN 1869928520
- Uncle Ramsey's Little Book of Demons: The Positive Advantages of the Personification of Life's Problems. Aeon Books, 2005. ISBN 1904658091
- "How to See Fairies: Discover your Psychic Powers in Six Weeks". Aeon Books, 2011. ISBN 9781904658375
- The Abramelin Diaries. Aeon Books, 2019. ISBN 9781911597193
- Thoughts on Abramelin. The Mouse That Spins, 2019. ISBN 9780904311457
- My Years of Magical Thinking. The Mouse That Spins, 2017. ISBN 978-0904311242
- Thoughts on: Post-truth Politics & Magical Thinking. The Mouse That Spins, 2019. ISBN 9780904311501
