= Dept. of Computer Science, University of Delhi =

Department of Computer Science, University of Delhi
- संगणक विज्ञान विभाग
- Other names: DUCS
- Established: 1981
- Head: Sunil Kr. Muttoo
- Students: 200
- Location: 1st Floor, New Academic Block, University of Delhi, New Delhi, Delhi, India
- Campus: Urban
- Website: cs.du.ac.in

The Department of Computer Science, University of Delhi is a department in the University of Delhi under the Faculty of Mathematical Science, set up in 1981.

== Courses ==
The department started the three years Master of Computer Applications (MCA) program in 1982, which was among the first such programs in India. The department started M.Sc. Computer Science course in 2004.

Besides these the department has research interests in Computer Science and offers a Doctor of Philosophy (Ph.D.) program. The university conducts a postgraduate Diploma in Computer Applications (PGDCA) program through its constituent colleges. Emphasis is laid not only on the theoretical concepts but also on practical experience and industry interaction.

Faculty of Mathematical Sciences

== Few classroom projects ==
MCA

Apart from classroom teaching, students take up case studies, presentations and small projects. Following are some projects/assignments taken up by the students:

- Implementation of Unix Shell
- Implementation of Chat Server.
- Simulation of machine language code and implementation of assembler.
- Simulation of the basic file system on Linux.
- Simulation of Sliding Window Protocols
  - Go-Back N Protocol
  - Selective Repeat Protocol.
- Simulation of a two-pass assembler.
- Projects designed, documented and coded using SDLC
  - Share tracker system.
  - Computerized health care system.
  - Websites on tourism, online FIR, online book store, online examination, social networking, online shipping management system, digital library system.
- Research and implementation of cryptographic algorithms
  - Design and implementation of new approach for searching in encrypted data using Bloom Filter.
  - Analysis and implementation of security algorithms in Cloud Computing.
  - Malware and keylogger design.
  - Software and hardware implementation of Smart Home System.
  - Misuse, detection and prevention of Advance Spamming techniques.
  - Design and security analysis of chaotic encryption.
  - Analysis of risks, techniques, and corporate usage of Web 2.0 technologies.
  - Implementation of homomorphic encryption algorithms.
  - Regional language encryption and translation.
  - Implementation of elliptic curve cryptography.
  - Design and implementation of self synchronizing stream ciphers.

M.Sc. Computer Science

As part of the curriculum students give presentations, group projects and programming assignments. The following are some of the projects/assignments taken up by the students:

- Implementation of robot task assignment given resources using MATLAB.
- Jade programming for agent communication.
- Implementation of DES encryption and decryption algorithm.
- Application of genetic algorithm in 8-queens problem.
- Implementation of K-means, FP-Tree, BIRCH and DBSCAN algorithm using C++.
- Generating all strong association rules from a set of given frequent item sets of transactions.
- Implementation of DBMS.
- Data preprocessing and KDD (Knowledge Discovery and Data mining) using WEKA and C4.5.
- Implementation of clustering techniques on output of fuzzy C-means algorithm as initial input using MATLAB.
- Simulation of Lexical Analyzer and Parser using C.

== Infrastructure ==
The students of the department are affiliated to two libraries.

The Departmental Library: is a reference library with over four thousand titles, in the field of Computer Science and IT and in related areas such as Electronics and Mathematics.

The Central Science Library: is one of the largest science libraries in India. It was established in 1981, and has 2,20,000 volumes of books and periodicals. The website of CSL provides electronic subscription for 27,000 e-journals including IEEE, ACM, Springer journals and proceedings.

- Internet Connection

  - All the labs, offices and faculty rooms of the Department are connected to the internet through the university intranet. Internet connectivity is provided using 4 switches through the university intranet. 24 port switch is used in LAN, providing internet to all systems in the laboratory, classrooms, seminar room and committee room.

Delhi University Computer Centre

== Notable alumni ==
- Kiran Sethi - VP, Deutsche Bank, USA
- Pradeep Mathur - VP, Capgemini, UK
- Gulshan Kumar - Director, Alcatel-Lucent, India
- Ranjan Dhar - Director, Silicon Graphics, India
- Manish Madan - VP, Perot Systems, TSI, India
- Sachin Wadhwa - Head Operations, Mastech InfoTrellis Inc, USA
- Kumaran Sasikanthan -Country Head, AllSight Software, India
