= Tumor budding =

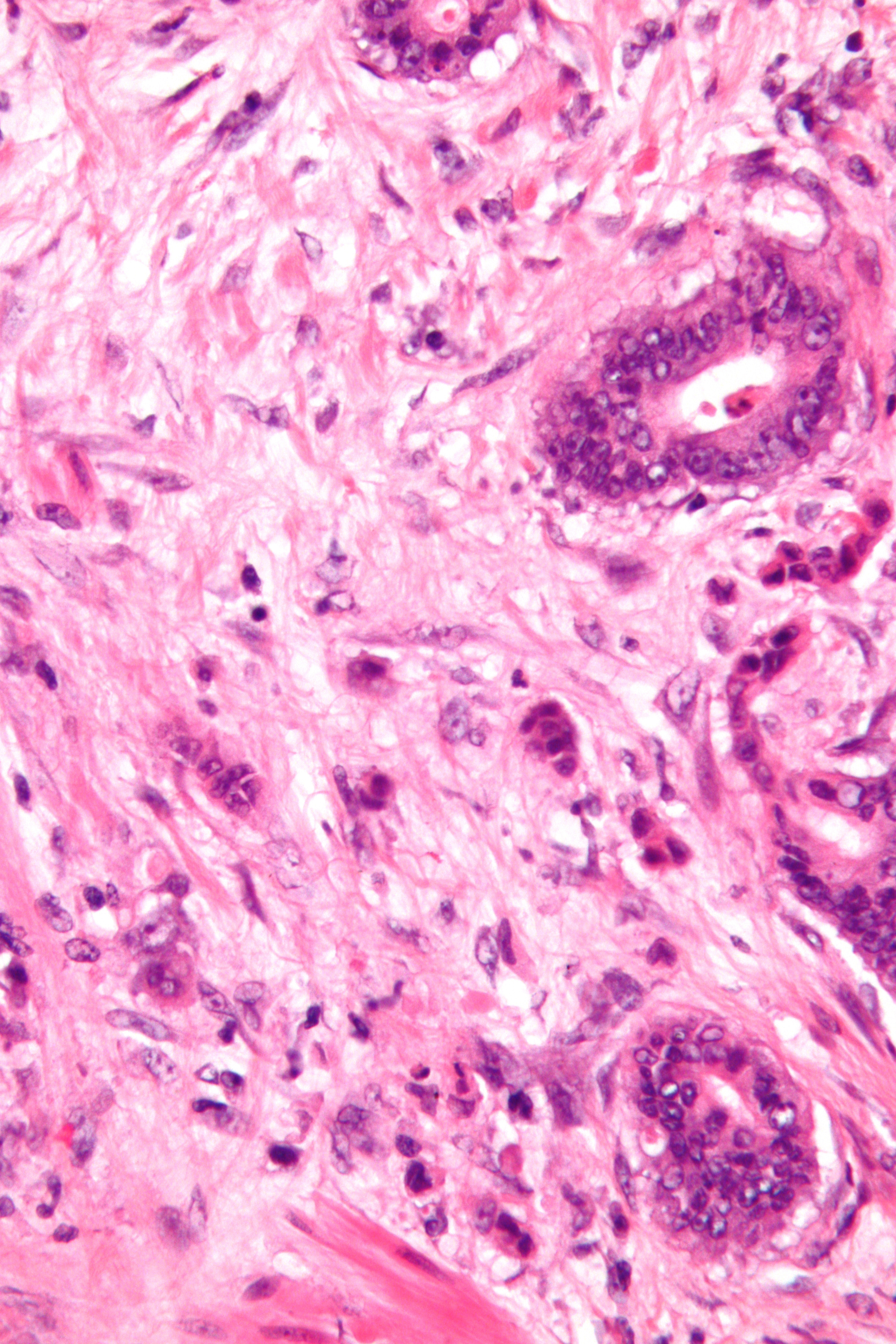
High magnification H&E stained histological slide showing tumor budding in a case of Colorectal cancer. The 'buds' depicted in the image are the smaller dark colored structures at the center and left side of the image. Larger ovoid structures at right are non-budding tumor glands

Tumor budding is loosely defined by the presence of individual cells and small clusters of tumor cells at the invasive front of carcinomas. It has been postulated to represent an epithelial–mesenchymal transition (EMT).

Tumor budding is a well-established independent adverse prognostic factor in colorectal carcinoma that may allow for stratification of patients into risk categories more meaningful than those defined by TNM staging, and also potentially guide treatment decisions, especially in T1 and T3 N0 (Stage II, Dukes’ B) colorectal carcinoma. Unfortunately, its universal acceptance as a reportable factor has been held back by a lack of definitional uniformity with respect to both qualitative and quantitative aspects of tumor budding.
