= HMS Duke of Wellington =

Two Royal Navy ships have carried the name Duke of Wellington

- HMS Duke of Wellington (1852), a 131-gun first-rate ship of the line of the Royal Navy
- TSS Duke of York (1935), a steamer renamed Duke of Wellington during the Second World War for service as a Landing Ship, Infantry

== See also ==
- HMS Wellington
- HMS Iron Duke
