= HMS Iron Duke =

Three ships of the British Royal Navy have been named HMS Iron Duke after Arthur Wellesley, 1st Duke of Wellington, nicknamed the "Iron Duke". The name is also a pun, as the first ship so named was an ironclad.

- HMS Iron Duke (1870) was a battleship launched in 1870, paid off in 1893, converted to as a coal hulk, and sold 1906 for scrap.
- HMS Iron Duke (1912) was the name-ship of a class of battleships, launched in 1912 and sold in 1946 for scrap. She is most famous for being the fleet flagship at the Battle of Jutland.
- HMS Iron Duke (F234) is a Type 23 frigate launched in 1991 and withdrawn from service 2026.

== Battle honours ==
Ships named Iron Duke have earned the following battle honours:

- Jutland, 1916

== See also ==
- HMS Duke of Wellington (1852), another ship named after the first Duke of Wellington.
- HMS Duke of Wellington
- HMS Wellington
