= Headgear (band) =

- Origin: Limerick, Ireland
- Genres: Rock, electronica
- Years active: 2001–2008, returned 2021
- Labels: Marthadigs, Diamond Head
- Members: Daragh Dukes; Kevin Brew (live); Orla Dukes (live); Billy Mulqueen (live); Barra O'Toole (live); Osgar Dukes (live); Pat Shortt (live); Emre Ramazonoglu (live)

Headgear is a musical project of the Dublin-born musician and producer Daragh Dukes and several other collaborators and fellow producers. Musically, it can perhaps best be described as a collage of electronica and rock.

Where This Good Life Goes, a 6 track mini-album, was released in October 2002 on Diamond Head Recordings.

The eponymous album, Headgear, featuring the singles Singin' in The Drain and Halibut, was released in 2004, on Dukes' own Marthadigs label, to critical acclaim. Irish music magazine Hot Press called it "a beguiling marriage of bedsit melancholia with laboratory electronica and quite the chamber-pop pocket symphony". The album Flight Cases was released in early 2007, including Harry Truman and Mister Petit both of which featured on prominent best of 2007 Irish song lists.

Irish comedian Pat Shortt plays saxophone on the Headgear track Singin' in The Drain. The Cranberries' drummer, Fergal Lawler, played live with Headgear in Dublin in 2003.

The music of Headgear saw increasing public exposure due to plays on the popular Mystery Train radio show on RTÉ Radio 1, including a live set, and appearances on The View on RTÉ television.

Dukes also took part in the Wasted Youth Orchestra with Rory Carlile. Their song A Letter from Saint Jude featured on the album Music from and Inspired by Spider-Man 3.

He works as a composer for hire working mainly on documentary features from his Limerick studio at

Dukes also uses the pseudonym 'Asylum Speakers'. Headgear re-emerged in 2021 with Omphalos Pt.1.
