= HMS Duke (shore establishment) =

Coordinates: 52.100°N 2.316°W

HMS Duke was a Royal Naval shore establishment based in Great Malvern, off St Andrews Road. It was commissioned on 27 May 1941, and by May 1943 it was being used to provide tented accommodation for New Entry Stokers. From the date of its commissioning, it had a nominal depot ship based at Chatham - a 27-foot (8.2 m) whaler.

The establishment was paid off on 31 March 1946, and became the Royal Signals and Radar Establishment.
