= Duke (given name) =

Duke is a masculine given name, also used as a nickname or stage name. Notable people with the name include:

- Duke Aiona (born 1955), American politician
- Duke Cunningham (1941–2025), American fighter pilot and politician
- Duke Dawson (born 1996), American football player
- Duke Droese (born 1968), American wrestler
- Duke Dumont (born 1981), English DJ
- Duke Ejiofor (born 1995), American football player
- Duke Ellington (1899-1974), American jazz musician
- Duke Ihenacho (born 1989), American National Football League player
- Duke Kahanamoku (1890–1968), Hawaiian swimmer and surfer
- Duke McKenzie (born 1963), British retired boxer
- Duke Miles (born 2002), American basketball player
- Duke Pearson (1932–1980), American jazz musician
- Duke Powell (born 1955), American paramedic and politician
- Duke Riley (artist), American artist
- Duke Riley (American football) (born 1994), American football player
- Duke Snider (1926–2011), American baseball player
