= J. J. Colledge =

British naval historian (1908–1997)

James Colledge
- Born: 1908; Chatham, England, British Empire
- Died: 26 April 1997 (aged 88–89)
- Spouse: Rena (m. 1940)
- Children: 2 sons and daughters

James Joseph Colledge (1908 – 26 April 1997) was a British naval historian, author of Ships of the Royal Navy, the standard work on the fighting ships of the Royal Navy from the 15th century to the 20th century.

He also wrote Warships of World War II with Henry Trevor Lenton, listing Royal and Commonwealth warships.
