= ENS Al-Qahhar =

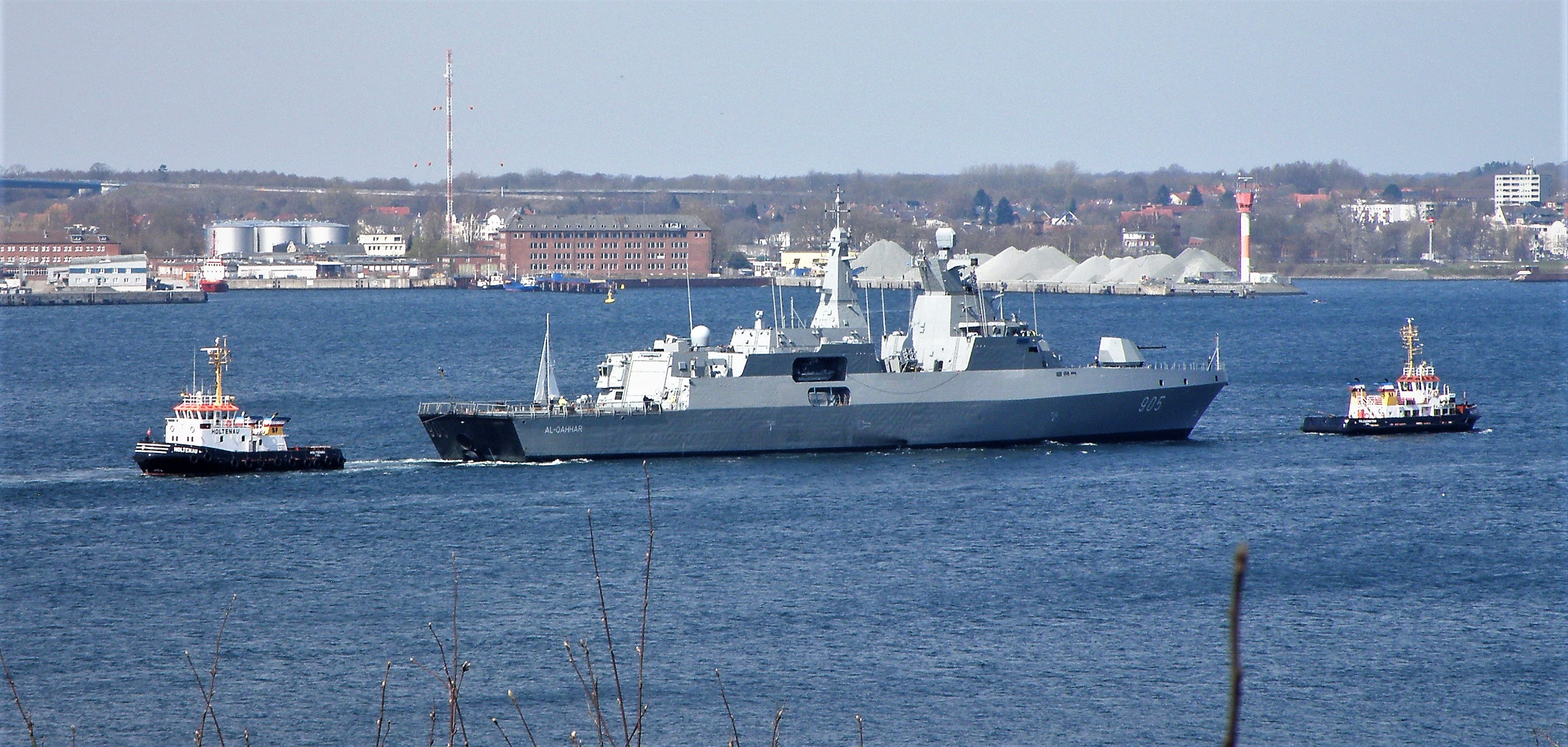
- ENS Al-Qahhar in the Kieler Förde, 10 April 2023

History

Egypt
- Name: Al-Qahhar; (القهار)
- Ordered: November 2018
- Builder: Stahlbau Nord GmbH, Bremerhaven
- Laid down: March 2020
- Launched: August 2021
- Commissioned: 26 May 2023
- Identification: Hull number: F 905
- Status: In active service

General characteristics
- Type: Al-Aziz-class frigate
- Displacement: 3,700 tonnes (3,600 long tons) full
- Length: 118 m (387 ft)
- Beam: 14.8 m (49 ft)
- Draught: 4.3 m (14 ft)
- Propulsion: CODAG WARP; 2 × MTU 16V 1163 TB93 diesel engines, 5,920 kilowatts (7,940 hp); 2 × shafts, CPP; 1 × General Electric LM2500, 20,000 kilowatts (27,000 hp); 1 × waterjet
- Speed: 28 knots (52 km/h)
- Range: 7,200 NM (13,300 km) at 16 knots (30 km/h)
- Boats & landing craft carried: 2 × boats
- Complement: 120
- Sensors & processing systems: Thales NS-110 4D AESA air/surface surveillance radar; SATCOM system; towed sonar
- Electronic warfare & decoys: Thales SCORPION 2 ECM & ESM; Leonardo WASS C310 decoy launchers; 4 × Rheinmetall MASS decoy launchers
- Armament: 1 × Otobreda 127/64 gun; 2 × Oerlikon Searanger 20 RWS; 2 × 4 Exocet MM40 Block 3 SSM launchers; 32 × VL MICA NG VLS cells; torpedo tubes for MU90 & DM2A4 torpedoes
- Aircraft carried: 2 × helicopters
- Aviation facilities: Flight deck and hangar

ENS Al-Qahhar (F 905) (Arabic: القهار, "the irresistible subduer") is an Al-Aziz-class frigates of the Egyptian Navy.

== Design and description ==
Al-Qahhar is a MEKO A-200EN frigate, designed by Blohm + Voss. The frigate has a length of 118 m (387 ft), beam of 14.8 m (49 ft), and draught of 4.3 m (14 ft). The frigate has a full load displacement of 3,700 tonnes (3,600 long tons) and is powered by combined diesel and gas waterjet and refined propeller (CODAG WARP) propulsion system, consisted of two 5,920 kilowatts (7,940 hp) MTU 16V 1163 TB93 diesel engines connected to two shafts with controllable pitch propellers, and one 20,000 kilowatts (27,000 hp) General Electric LM2500 gas turbine to power the waterjet. She has a speed of 28 knots (52 km/h) and range of 7,200 NM (13,300 km) with cruising speed of 16 knots (30 km/h). The ship has a complement of 120 personnel.

The ship is armed with one Otobreda 127 mm/64 gun and four 20 mm Oerlikon Searanger 20 remote weapon systems. For surface warfare, Al-Qahhar are equipped with eight Exocet MM40 Block 3 anti-ship missile launchers, consisted of two quad launchers, and 32 vertical launching system cells for VL MICA NG anti-aircraft missiles. For anti-submarine warfare, she is equipped with torpedo tubes for MU90 Impact and DM2A4 torpedoes.

Her sensors and electronic systems consisted of Thales NS-110 4D active electronically scanned array air/surface surveillance radar, satellite communication system, towed array sonar, Thales SCORPION 2 ECM and ESM system.

The frigate's countermeasures systems consisted of two 32-tube Rheinmetall Multi Ammunition Softkill System (MASS) decoy launchers and decoy launchers for Leonardo WASS C310 surface anti-torpedo countermeasure systems.

Al-Qahhar has a flight deck and hangar capable to accommodate two helicopters and a vertically-launched drone, and two boats.

== Construction and career ==
The Egyptian government signed a US$2.7 billion contract with ThyssenKrupp Marine Systems (TKMS) in November 2018 for four MEKO A-200EN frigates and training program for its crews. Three ships were constructed in Germany, with the fourth ship to be built in Egypt.

Work on the construction of the ship was started with the first steel cutting ceremony in September 2019, with her keel was laid down in March 2020. The frigate was launched in August 2021 at Stahlbau Nord GmbH shipyard in Bremerhaven. Al-Qahhar started sea trials on 9 November 2022, departing Bremerhaven at 9 pm for trials in the North Sea. She was transferred to Kiel for testing at the TKMS facility in the city in December 2022. The ship also run trials in Kieler Förde, the Bay of Kiel, and the Baltic Sea. Al-Qahhar was handed over to the Egyptian Navy at a ceremony in Bremerhaven on 26 May 2023.
