= MEKO 200 =

Widely exported German frigate design

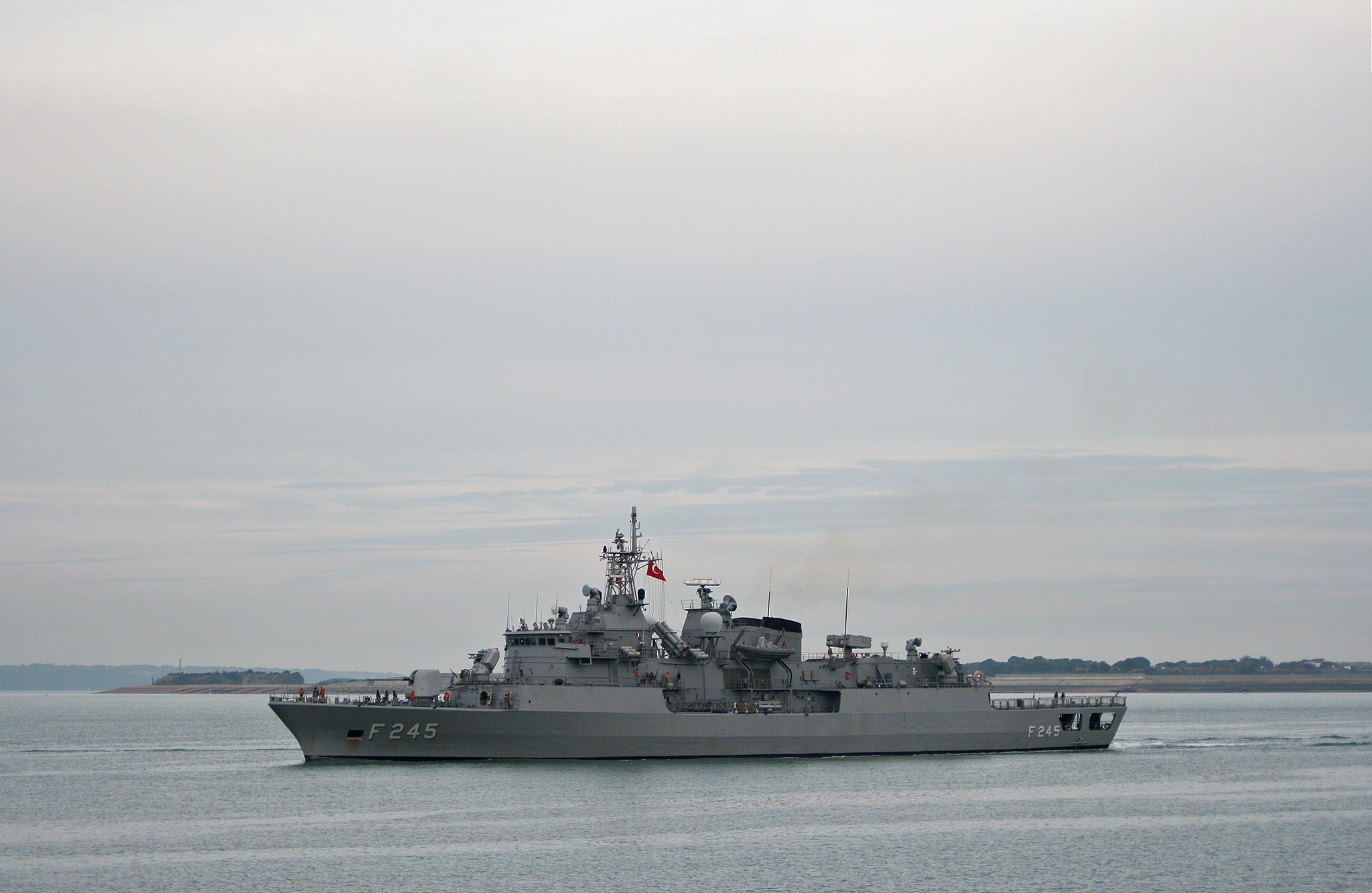
- Turkish Navy frigate TCG Oruç Reis departing from Portsmouth Naval Base in the United Kingdom, September 2009.

Class overview
- Name: MEKO 200; MEKO A-200; MEKO A class; MEKO D; Delta class
- Builders: Blohm + Voss
- Operators: See Operators; Turkish Naval Forces; Royal Australian Navy; Hellenic Navy; Portuguese Navy; Royal New Zealand Navy; South African Navy; Algerian National Navy; Egyptian Navy
- Subclasses: MEKO 200; Anzac class; MEKO 200HN; Hydra class; MEKO 200PN; Vasco da Gama class; MEKO 200TN: Yavuz class (200TN Track I); Barbaros class (200TN Track II); MEKO A-200 AN; Erradii class; MEKO A-200 DEU; F128 class; MEKO A-200 EN; Al-Aziz class; MEKO A-200SAN; Valour class; MEKO 200PN; Vasco da Gama class; MEKO 200PN; Vasco da Gama class
- In service: 1987–present
- Planned: 42
- Building: 1
- Completed: 34
- Active: 33
- Retired: 1

General characteristics
- Type: Frigate
- Displacement: 3,400 tons (full load)
- Length: 118 m (387 ft)
- Beam: 14.8 m (49 ft)
- Draught: 4.3 m (14 ft)
- Propulsion: 1 × General Electric LM2500+ gas turbine and 2 × MTU 12V1163 TB83 diesel engines, driving two shafts with controllable pitch propellers in CODOG configuration.
- Speed: 32 knots (59 km/h)
- Range: 6,000 nautical miles (11,000 km) at 18 knots (33 km/h)
- Complement: 220
- Sensors & processing systems: Sonars: Thomson Sintra Spherion B Mod 5; hull-mounted; active search and attack; medium frequency. Provision for towed array; Air search radar: Raytheon AN/SPS-49(V)8 ANZ (C/D-band); Surface search radar: Saab 9LV 453 TIR (Ericsson Tx/Rx) (G-band); Navigation: Atlas Elektronik 9600 ARPA (I-band)
- Electronic warfare & decoys: ESM: Racal modified Sceptre A (radar intercept), Telefunken PST-1720 Telegon 10 (comms intercept); Countermeasures: Decoys: G & D Aircraft SRBOC Mk-36 Mod 1 decoy launchers for SRBOC
- Armament: Guns: 1 × 5 in/54 (127 mm) Mk-45 Mod 2 naval artillery gun; 3 × Phalanx or Sea Zenith CIWS; Missiles: Mk-41 Mod 5/Mod 8 VLS for ESSM and Sea Sparrow SAM; 2 x 8 × Harpoon or; 2 x 8 × RBS-15 SSM; Torpedoes: 2 × triple 324 mm Mk-32 Mod 5 tubes; Fire control: Saab 9LV 453 (J-band); Combat data systems: Saab 9LV 453 Mk-3 Link 11; Weapons control: Saab 9LV 453 optronic director with Raytheon CW Mk-73 Mod 1
- Aircraft carried: 1 × S-70B Seahawk or; 1 × SH-2G Super Seasprite

The MEKO 200 is a frigate design by the Blohm + Voss shipyard of Germany, as part of the MEKO family of warships.

== Variants ==
=== Anzac class (MEKO 200ANZ) ===
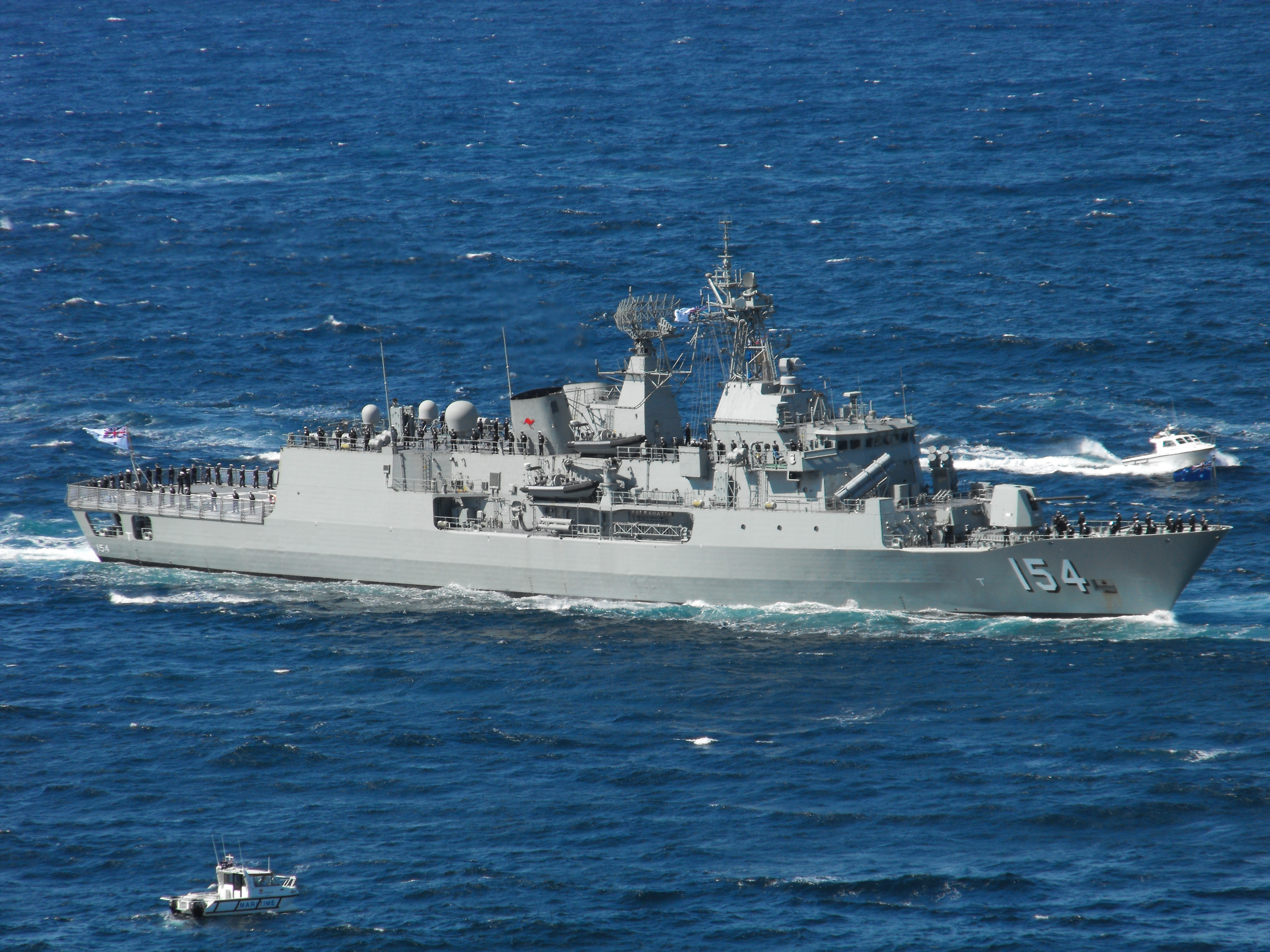
HMAS Parramatta, an Anzac-class MEKO 200 type frigate of the Royal Australian Navy.

Ten MEKO 200 frigates were built to the Anzac-class design: eight for the Royal Australian Navy, and two for the Royal New Zealand Navy.

The Australian Department of Defence decided to upgrade their Anzacs before all ships were completed. The upgraded configuration includes RGM-84 Harpoon anti-ship missiles fitted in two quad launchers, Evolved Sea Sparrow missiles quad-packed in VLS enabling 32 missiles to be carried, four Nulka active missile decoy bays, and the TSM 5424 Petrel mine and obstacle avoidance sonar system. All upgrades and new builds were scheduled for completion by 2006.

In 2004 Tenix, Saab, and the Australian Department of Defence formed a Private Public Partnership to upgrade the anti-ship missile defence capability of the Anzac class. This upgrade will include Sagem Vampir NG IRST (infra-red search and track) capability, Saab 9LV Combat Management System upgrade and CEA Technologies PAR 3D E/F band fixed active phased array radar and illuminator. A new main mast will be constructed to incorporate the CEAFAR and CEAMOUNT systems and maintain the existing 2D radar and electronic surveillance capabilities.

The two RNZN frigates have been upgraded under the Future Systems Upgrade Program at Seaspan Shipyard in Victoria, British Columbia, Canada. The upgrades included the MBDA Sea Ceptor SAM (20 missiles), new soft kill self defence systems, Lockheed Martin Canada's CMS 330 Combat Management System, new sonar processing systems and an underwater communications system.

=== Yavuz/Barbaros class (MEKO 200TN) ===
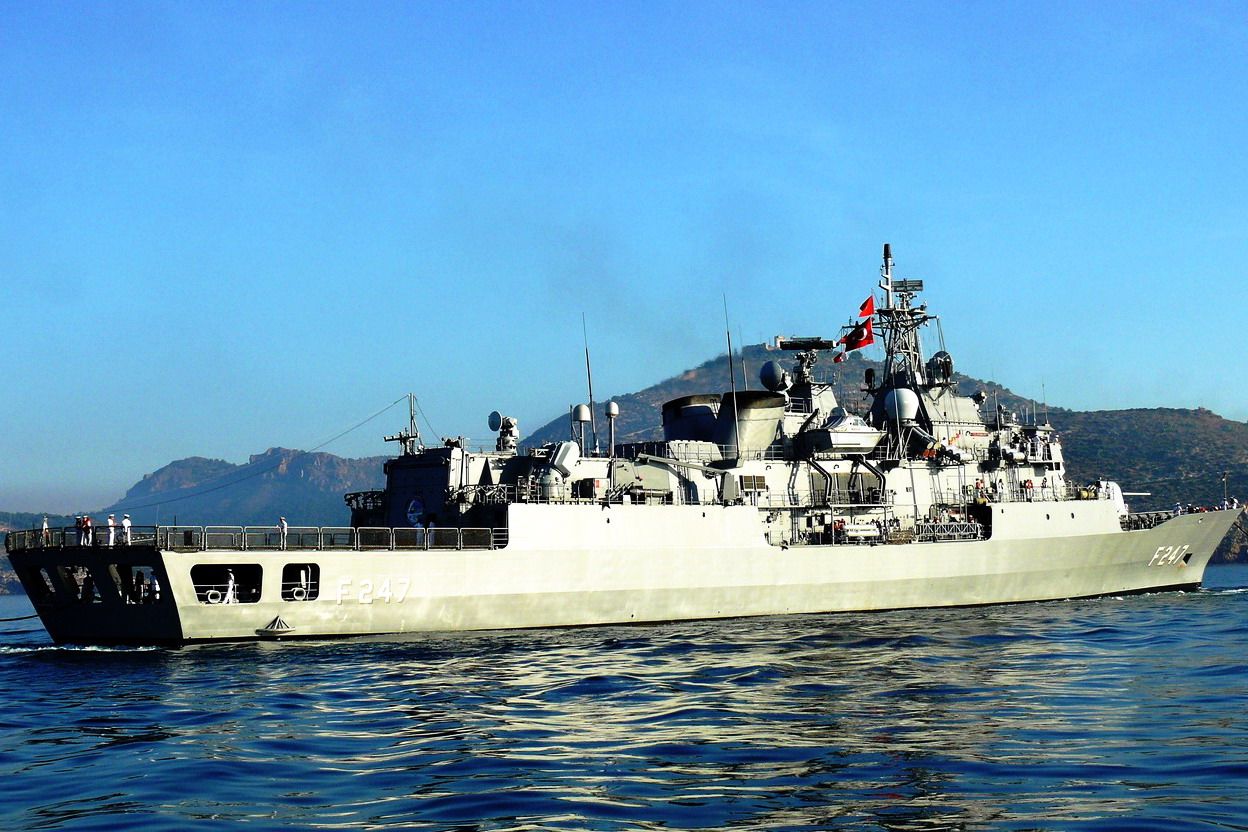
TCG Kemal Reis, a Salih Reis-class (MEKO 200 TN Track II-B) frigate of the Turkish Navy.

The Turkish variant, MEKO 200TN, is a modified MEKO 200 type multirole frigate. The first order for the Turkish Navy was signed in April 1983. Two MEKO 200TN were built in Germany and two built in the Gölcük shipyards in Turkey. The vessels are also known as MEKO 200TN Track I or Yavuz class, after the lead ship of the family. Two more orders followed, each known as Track IIA Barbaros class and Track IIB.

The Yavuz-class frigates have adopted the CODAD propulsion method with 4 MTU 20V Diesel engines, which require a substantial amount of maintenance. There were also questions over the selection of the Swiss manufactured Sea Zenith, an advanced CIWS system that was never previously used on any naval platform, but there have been no negative reports regarding the system's performance from the Turkish Navy. The later Track IIA frigates have incorporated major improvements including the CODOG propulsion method with two MTU 16V diesel engines and two LM2500-30 gas turbines, a greater displacement of 3,350 tons (full load) and the replacement of the older Mk-29 Sea Sparrow launcher with the Mk-41 Mod 8 VLS.

These frigates are considered to be used not for naval superiority, but rather as sea-denying assets that will try to inflict maximum damage to the enemy, while trying to keep friendly casualties low. MEKO200TN Track I/IIA/IIBs have a maximum speed of 27/31+ knots, with a range of 4,000 nautical miles (7,400 km; 4,600 mi) at a speed of 20/22 knots. Their armament includes the FMC Mk 45 127 mm/54 caliber gun, eight RGM-84 Harpoons, two triple-mounted Mk 32 324 mm torpedo tubes, and 8/16 RIM-7 Sea Sparrow missiles.

Electronic equipment includes the DA 08/ AWS-9 surface/air surveillance radar, the WM 25/ AWS 6 tracking radar, the TM 1226/ 2690BT ARPA navigation radar, and STACOS TU/FD Tactical Command and Control System. The Turkish frigates are equipped with WM25/ COSYS DDWCS Fire Control System, a DE1160 sonar, and Link 11/14 VESTA CDL2, MCS2002 communication systems.

=== Vasco da Gama class (MEKO 200PN) ===
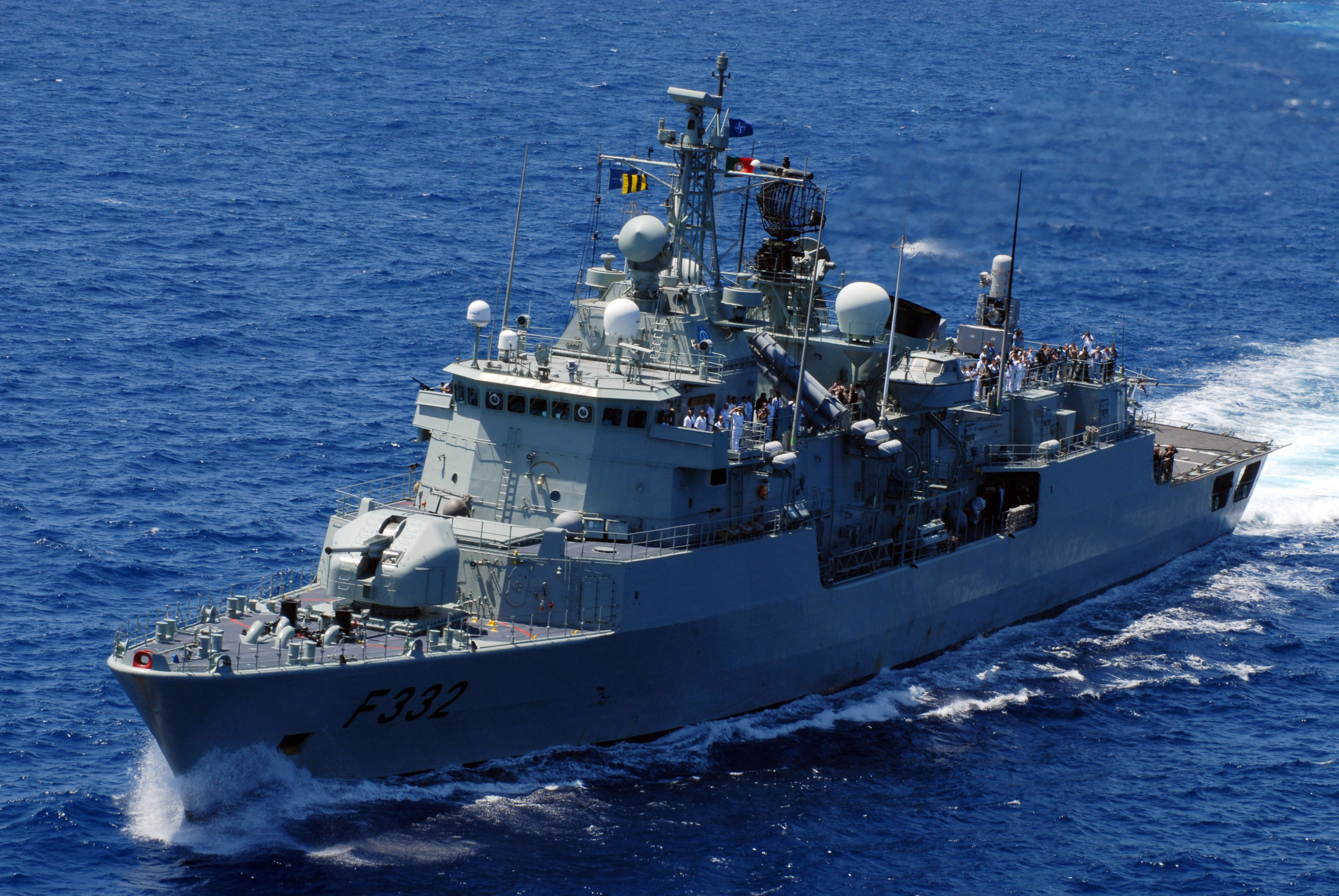
The Portuguese Navy frigate NRP Corte Real participates in a pass and review during the North Atlantic Council at Sea Day.

The Vasco da Gama class, a development of the MEKO 200 PN German concept, are major surface ships of the Portuguese Navy. Portugal operates three ships of this class, which were built in Kiel by Blohm + Voss, and later by HDW, using modular construction techniques. These vessels are unique in the MEKO 200 family as they are the only ones equipped with the French 100mm naval gun as their main gun.

The project for the construction of three frigates of this class was authorized by the Portuguese Government in 1985, five years after the request of the Portuguese Navy for the acquisition of new surface ships.

=== Hydra class (MEKO 200HN) ===
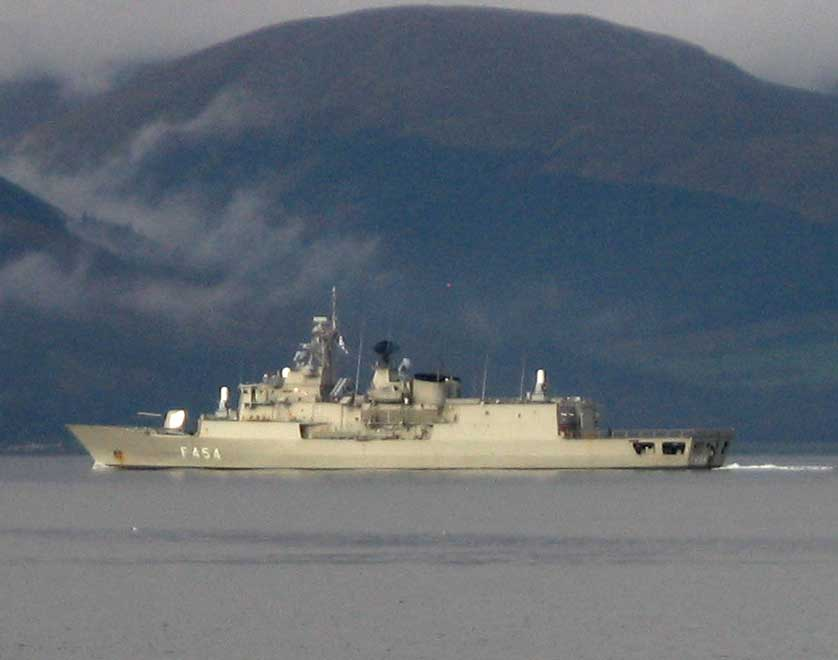
Hellenic Navy frigate HS Psara sailing down the Firth of Clyde in Scotland, at the start of Neptune Warrior (NW 063) multinational training exercise.

The MEKO frigates have high-level specifications for shock resistance, stiffness requirements for the fire control and radar systems, and blast and gas pressure resistance to retain the integrity of the on-board weapon systems. The hull is constructed of high tensile steel with a yield strength of S355 N/mm² 'structural steel grades'.

The ship is divided into twelve self-sufficient watertight sections, which function almost independently of each other. Each compartment has independent data transfer to the ship's Naval Automation System, Nautos.

The four Hydra-class frigates of the Hellenic Navy of Greece are 3,200-ton frigates of the MEKO 200HN design. The first of the four, Hydra was built by Blohm + Voss in Hamburg and commissioned in 1992. The other three were constructed at the Hellenic Shipyards Co. at Skaramagas. Spetsai was commissioned in 1996, Psara in 1998 and Salamis in 1999. Three Hydra-class frigates were deployed in support of Operation Enduring Freedom 2002–2003.

=== Valour class (MEKO A-200SAN) ===
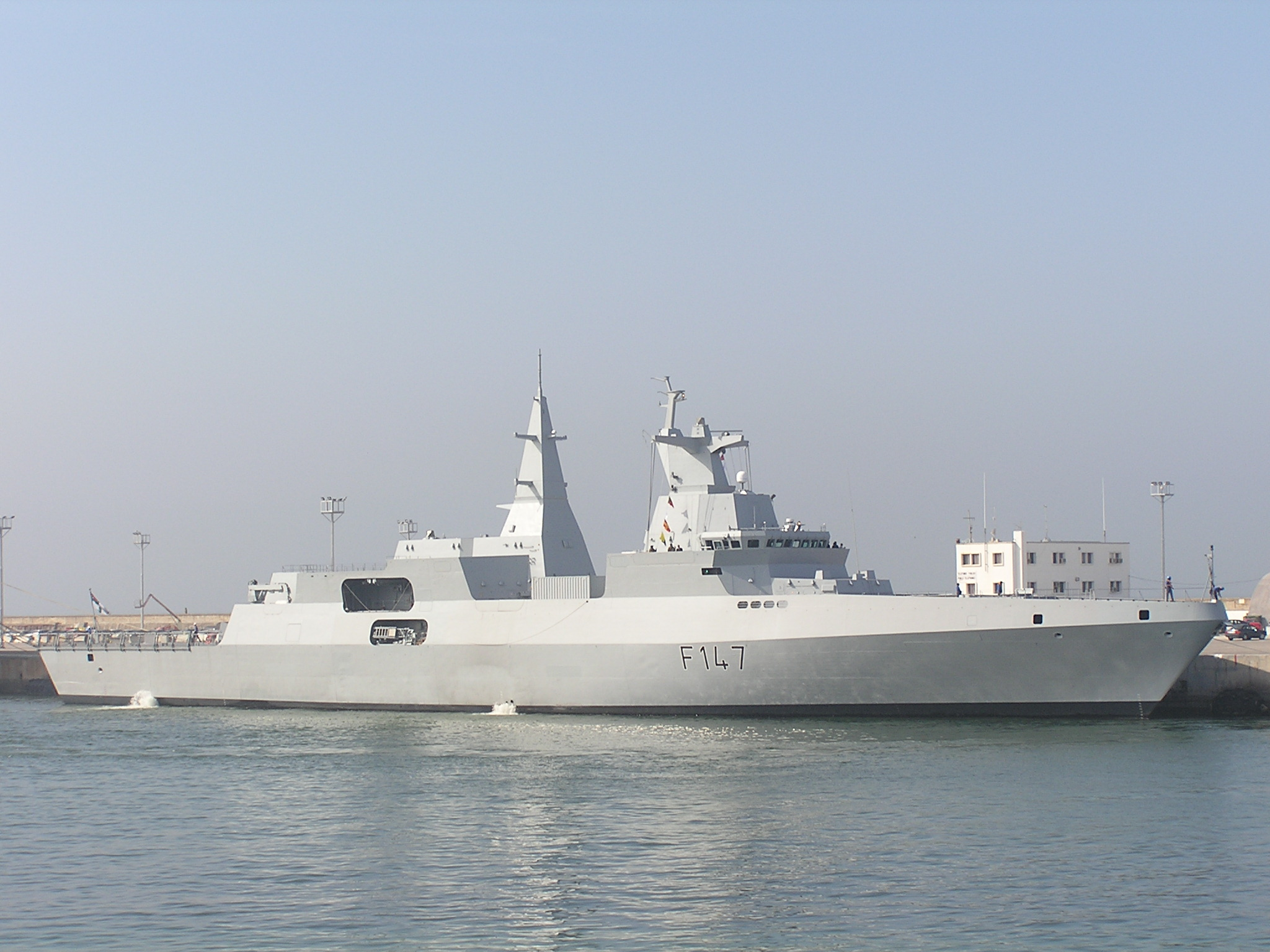
SAS Spioenkop before weapons and sensors were fitted

Four Valour-class frigates: SAS Amatola, SAS Isandlwana, SAS Spioenkop and SAS Mendi were constructed by Blohm + Voss for the South African Navy between 2000 and 2005.

The improved A-200SAN design incorporates new signature reduction measures. The combat management system is sourced from Thales. Two SuperLynx 300, one Atlas Oryx, two AgustaWestland AW109, one Rooivalk or various UAVs can be accommodated.

=== Erradii class (MEKO A-200AN) ===
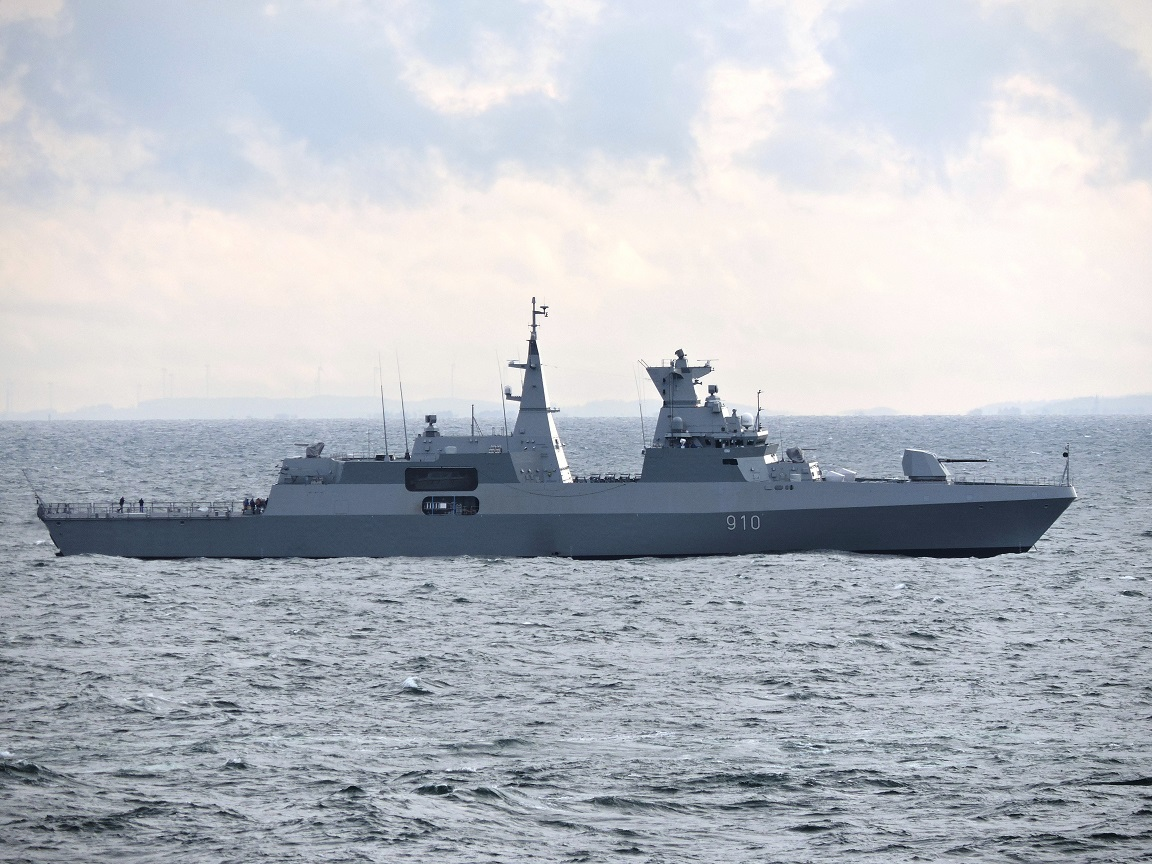
Erradii was the first German built MEKO A-200 AN frigate commissioned with the Algerian Navy

The Algerian Navy operates two MEKO A-200AN frigates, Erradii (910) and El Moudamir (911). The MEKO A-200AN is based on the MEKO A-200SAN. The ships were ordered from ThyssenKrupp Marine Systems. Construction was subcontracted to the ADM Kiel shipyard. There was an option for two more in 2014 but as of 2021 the number of ships in service was two.

The MEKO A-200AN include the following equipment:

- Oto Melara 127/64 LW 127 mm main gun
- MSI-Defence 30 mm cannons
- Denel Dynamics Umkhonto-IR surface-to-air missiles
- Saab/Diehl Defence RBS-15 Mk3 anti-ship missiles
- Rheinmetall Defence MASS softkill decoy launchers
- Saab Sea Giraffe AMB 3D surveillance radar
- Saab CEROS 200 radar/electro-optical fire control directors
- Thales UMS4132 Kingklip sonar

In 2016, Navy Recognition reported that the MEKO A-200AN was expected to use the CODAG-WARP (WAter jet and Refined Propellers) propulsion like the MEKO A-200SAN, with the MEKO A-200AN having a water-jet drive and two propellers.

=== Al-Aziz class (MEKO A-200EN) ===
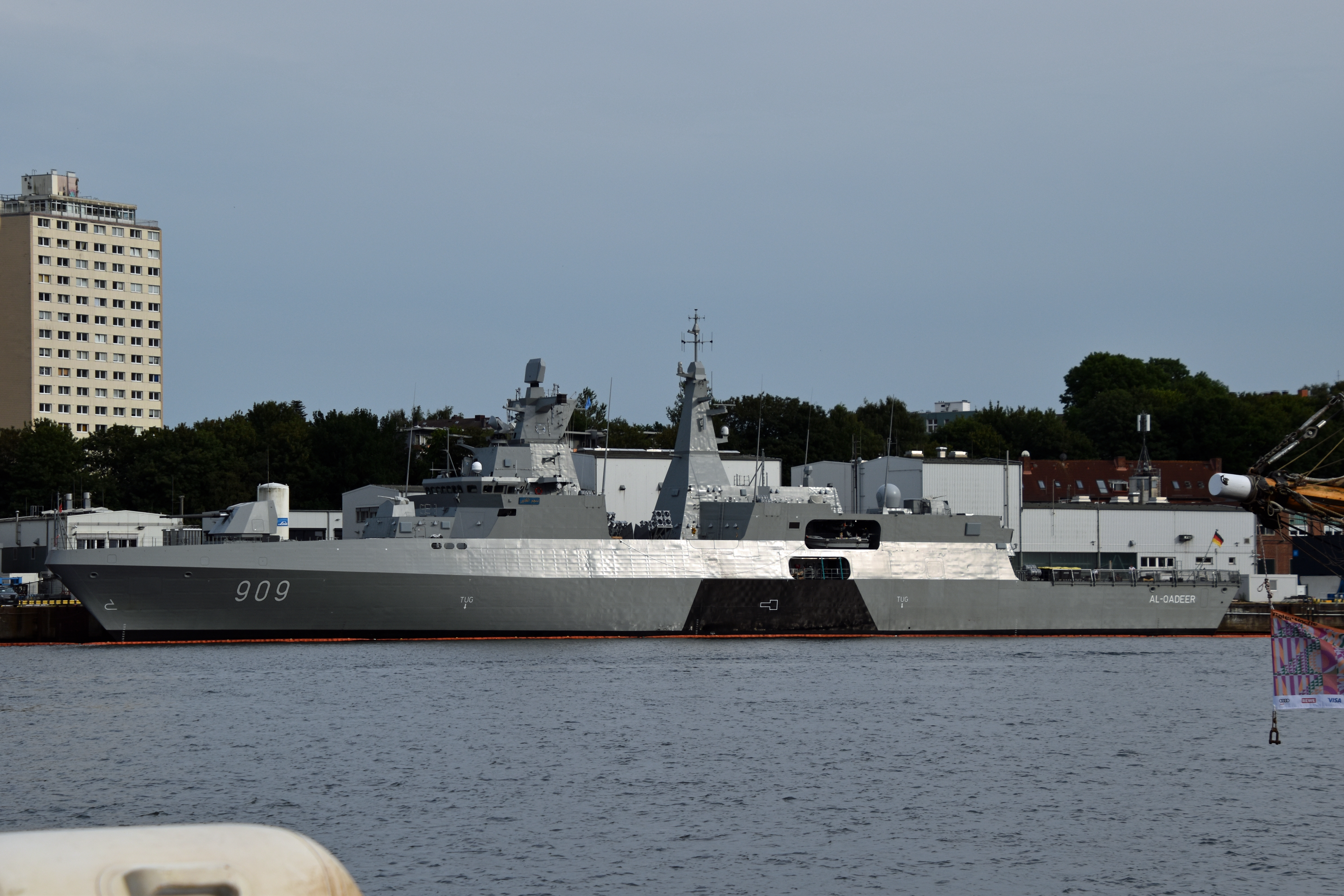
Egyptian Navy frigate ENS Al-Qadeer during fitting out in Kiel, Germany, June 2023

As of January 2024, the Egyptian Navy operates three MEKO A-200EN frigates, ENS Al-Aziz, ENS Al-Qahhar and ENS Al-Qadeer. The fourth ship, ENS Al-Jabbar, is undergoing fitting out.

In December 2021, the German government approved the sale of 3 frigates to Egypt. This order was increased to 4, then to the current 6 frigates, with some to be built in Egypt. The first vessel was handed over in October 2022.

The MEKO A-200EN included the following equipment:

- Oto Melara 127/64 LW 127 mm main gun
- MSI-Defence 30 mm cannons
- 32 VLS cells for VL MICA NG surface to air missiles
- 8 Exocet anti-ship missiles
- Rheinmetall Defence MASS softkill decoy launchers
- NS-110 4D AESA radar

=== MEKO A-200 DEU ===
Preliminary contract signed in February 2026 for 3 ships, with a first delivery planned for 2029. It is a preliminary agreement.

== Operators ==
=== Current operators ===
Algeria
2 MEKO A-200AN (Erradii class)
Australia
7 MEKO 200ANZ (Anzac class) One retired.
Egypt
4+(2) MEKO A-200EN (Al-Aziz class) frigates ordered. Germany approved the export of three German-built ships in December 2021. The last ship is to be built in Egypt.
Greece
4 MEKO 200HN (Hydra class)
New Zealand
2 MEKO 200ANZ (Anzac class)
Portugal
3 MEKO 200PN (Vasco da Gama class)
South Africa
4 MEKO A-200SAN (Valour class)
Turkey
8 MEKO 200TN (4 x Yavuz class, 4 x Barbaros class)

=== Potential operators ===
Germany
Preliminary contract signed in February 2026 for 3 ships, with a first delivery planned for 2029. It is a preliminary agreement.

== See also ==
- Brandenburg-class frigate
- Baden-Württemberg-class frigate
- Formidable-class frigate
- La Fayette-class frigate
- MEKO 140
- MEKO 360
- Sachsen-class frigate
- Milgem-class corvette
- Sigma-class corvette
- Halifax-class frigate
