= ENS Al-Aziz =

MEKO 200 frigate of the Egyptian Navy

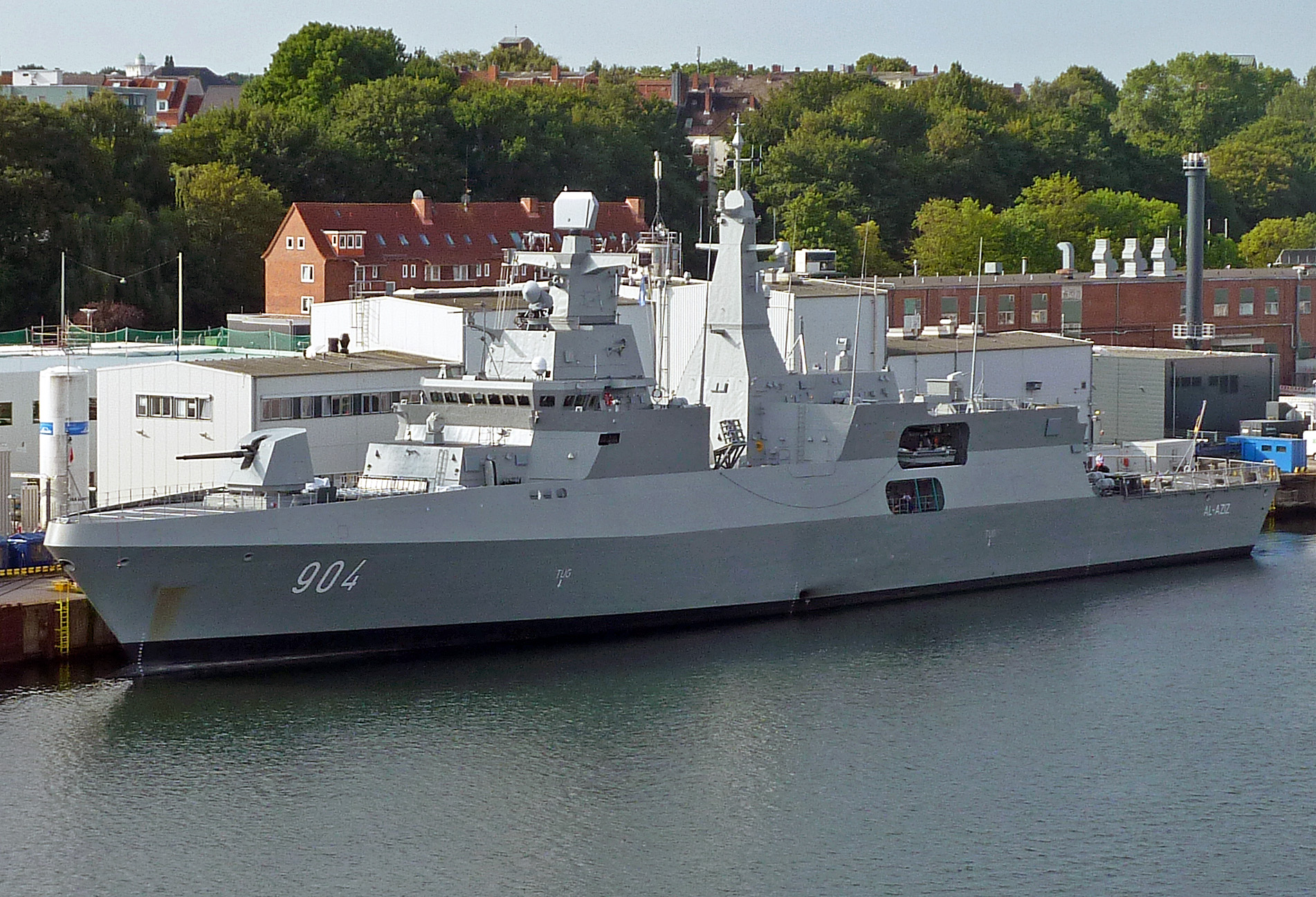
- ENS Al-Aziz moored in Kiel, 24 July 2022

History

Egypt
- Name: Al-Aziz; (العزيز)
- Ordered: November 2018
- Builder: Stahlbau Nord GmbH, Bremerhaven
- Laid down: 2020
- Launched: April 2021
- Commissioned: 14 October 2022
- Home port: Alexandria
- Identification: Hull number: F 904
- Status: In active service

General characteristics
- Type: Al-Aziz-class frigate
- Displacement: 3,700 tonnes (3,600 long tons) full
- Length: 118 m (387 ft)
- Beam: 14.8 m (49 ft)
- Draught: 4.3 m (14 ft)
- Propulsion: CODAG WARP; 2 × MTU 16V 1163 TB93 diesel engines, 5,920 kilowatts (7,940 hp); 2 × shafts, CPP; 1 × General Electric LM2500, 20,000 kilowatts (27,000 hp); 1 × waterjet
- Speed: 28 knots (52 km/h)
- Range: 7,200 NM (13,300 km) at 16 knots (30 km/h)
- Boats & landing craft carried: 2 × boats
- Complement: 120
- Sensors & processing systems: Thales NS-110 4D AESA air/surface surveillance radar; SATCOM system; towed sonar
- Electronic warfare & decoys: Thales SCORPION 2 ECM & ESM; Leonardo WASS C310 decoy launchers; 4 × Rheinmetall MASS decoy launchers
- Armament: 1 × Otobreda 127/64 gun; 2 × Oerlikon Searanger 20 RWS; 2 × 4 Exocet MM40 Block 3 SSM launchers; 32 × VL MICA NG VLS cells; torpedo tubes for MU90 & DM2A4 torpedoes
- Aircraft carried: 2 × helicopters
- Aviation facilities: Flight deck and hangar

ENS Al-Aziz (F 904) (Arabic: العزيز, lit. "powerful") is the lead ship of Al-Aziz-class frigates of the Egyptian Navy.

== Design and description ==
Al-Aziz is a MEKO A-200EN frigate, designed by Blohm + Voss. The frigate has a length of 118 m (387 ft), beam of 14.8 m (49 ft), and draught of 4.3 m (14 ft). The frigate has a full load displacement of 3,700 tonnes (3,600 long tons) and is powered by combined diesel and gas waterjet and refined propeller (CODAG WARP) propulsion system, consisted of two 5,920 kilowatts (7,940 hp) MTU 16V 1163 TB93 diesel engines connected to two shafts with controllable pitch propellers, and one 20,000 kilowatts (27,000 hp) General Electric LM2500 gas turbine to power the waterjet. She has a speed of 28 knots (52 km/h) and range of 7,200 NM (13,300 km) with cruising speed of 16 knots (30 km/h). The ship has a complement of 120 personnel.

The ship is armed with one Otobreda 127 mm/64 gun and four 20 mm Oerlikon Searanger 20 remote weapon systems. For surface warfare, Al-Aziz are equipped with eight Exocet MM40 Block 3 anti-ship missile launchers, consisted of two quad launchers, and 32 vertical launching system cells for VL MICA NG anti-aircraft missiles. For anti-submarine warfare, she is equipped with torpedo tubes for MU90 Impact and DM2A4 torpedoes.

Her sensors and electronic systems consisted of Thales NS-110 4D active electronically scanned array air/surface surveillance radar, satellite communication system, towed array sonar, Thales SCORPION 2 ECM and ESM system.

The frigate's countermeasures systems consisted of two 32-tube Rheinmetall Multi Ammunition Softkill System (MASS) decoy launchers and decoy launchers for Leonardo WASS C310 surface anti-torpedo countermeasure systems.

Al-Aziz has a flight deck and hangar capable to accommodate two helicopters and a vertically launched drone, and two boats.

== Construction and career ==
The Egyptian government signed a US$2.7 billion contract with ThyssenKrupp Marine Systems (TKMS) in November 2018 for four MEKO A-200EN frigates and training program for its crews. Three ships were constructed in Germany, with the fourth ship to be built in Egypt.

Work on the construction of the ship was started with the first steel cutting ceremony in September 2019, with her keel was laid down in 2020. The frigate was launched in late April 2021 at Stahlbau Nord GmbH shipyard in Bremerhaven and was fitted out at TKMS facility in Kiel. The ship was named as Al-Aziz in July 2021. She started sea trials in April 2022.

Al-Aziz was handed over to the Egyptian Navy at a ceremony held in Bremerhaven on 14 October 2022. She then sailed for her homeport in Alexandria. The frigate arrived at Alexandria Naval Base on 2 November 2022.
