= Norrköping-class missile boat =

Class of Swedish fast attack craft

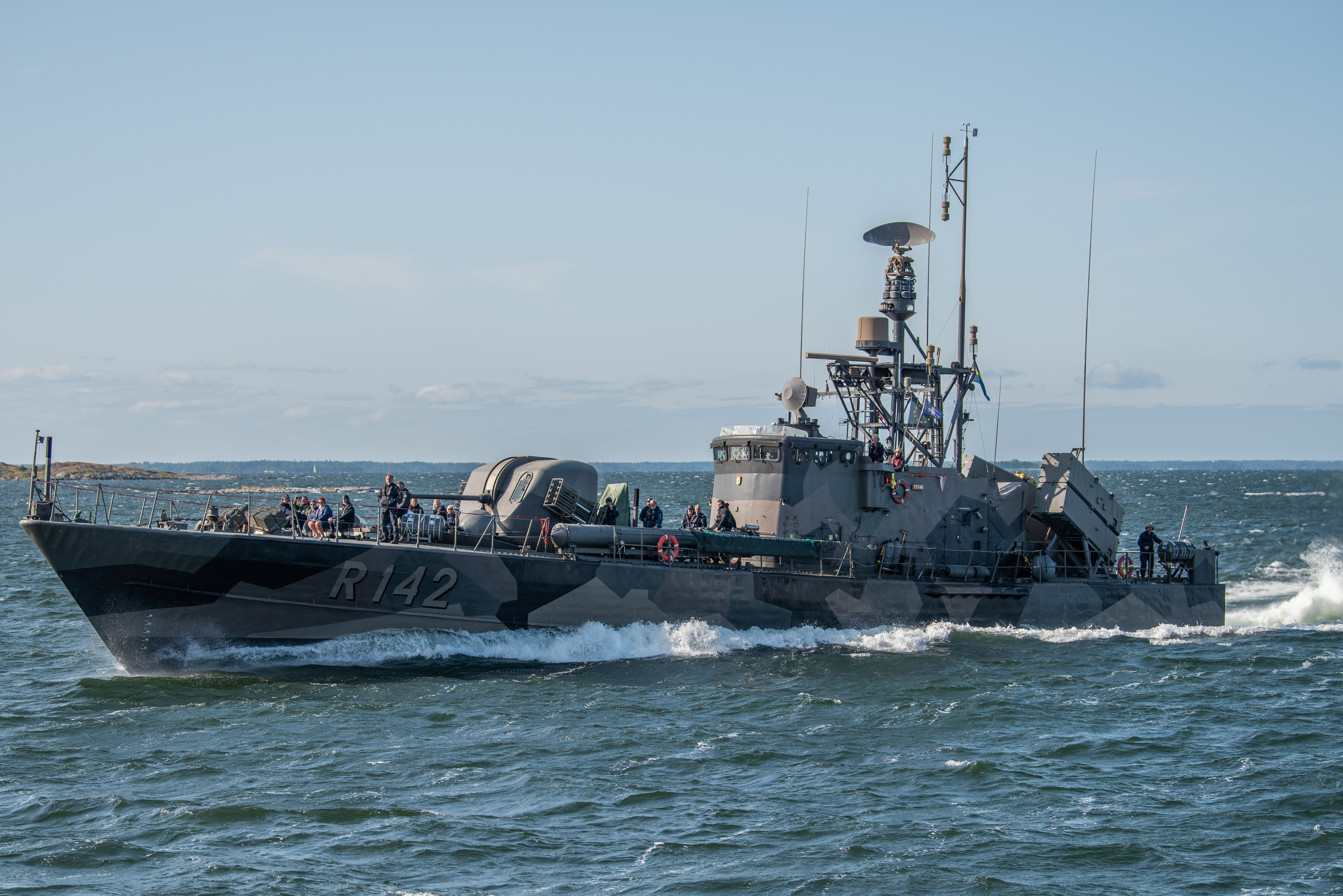
- HSwMS Ystad

Class overview
- Name: Norrköping class
- Builders: Karlskrona Navy Yard
- Operators: Swedish Navy
- Preceded by: Spica class
- Subclasses: Ystad class
- Built: 1971–1976
- In service: 1972–2005
- Completed: 12
- Retired: 12

General characteristics
- Type: Torpedo boat / missile boat
- Displacement: 220 tons standard, 255 tons full load
- Length: 43.6 m (143 ft)
- Beam: 7.1 m (23 ft)
- Draught: 1.6 m (5 ft 3 in)
- Propulsion: 3 shaft, Bristol Proteus gas turbines 12,750 hp (9,510 kW), 3 controllable pitch propellers
- Speed: 41 knots (76 km/h; 47 mph)
- Complement: 30
- Sensors & processing systems: Radar: Scanter 009, PEAB 9LV 200 mk1; Sea Giraffe 50HC radar post 1982–85 refits
- Electronic warfare & decoys: MARIS 880 weapons control system (post 1982–1985 refits)
- Armament: 1 × Bofors 57 mm gun; 6 × 533 mm (21 in) wire-guided torpedoes; 2 × 7.62×51mm NATO machine guns, Flare and chaff rockets, naval mines and/or depth charges; Up to 8 RBS-15 anti-ship missiles replaced 4 torpedo tubes after 1982–1985 refits

The Norrköping class were a group of fast attack craft built for the Swedish Navy in the 1970s. Twelve ships were built, with the last ship decommissioned in 2005. The boats have also been called the Spica II class and were named after Swedish cities.

== Design ==
The initial design was a version of the earlier Spica-class torpedo boat with some minor changes.

=== Machinery ===
The power train was identical to the preceding class and comprised three Bristol Proteus gas turbine engines driving three propellers.

=== Armament ===
The initial armament was identical to the Spica class, comprising a Bofors 57 mm gun and six 533 mm (21 in) torpedo tubes. There was a refit programme in 1982–1985, where four launchers for RBS-15 anti-ship missiles replaced four torpedo tubes. Mines could be carried in place of the torpedoes or missiles. The 1982 refit also included new sensors (Sea Giraffe radar) and a new weapons control system (Maris 880).

=== Ystad class modernisation ===
Six boats were modernised between 1996 and 2000 with new fire control systems and other electronics. The boats were originally set to be operated until 2010 but they were taken out of service early due to financial reasons with HSwMS Ystad decommissioning in 2005.

== Royal Malaysian Navy ==
A version of this design was built for the Royal Malaysian Navy by Karlskrona dockyard as the Handalan class. These ships had an all diesel power plant, with a revised superstructure design, different electronics and Exocet missiles.

== Ships ==
All ships were built by Karlskrona Dockyard

Number	Name	Launched	Decommissioned
T131	Norrköping	16 Nov 1972	2005 (modernised)
T132	Nynäshamn	24 Apr 1973	2003 (modernised)
T133	Norrtälje	18 Sep 1973	1998
T134	Varberg	2 Feb 1974	1998
T135	Västerås	15 May 1974	1998
T136	Västervik	2 Sep 1974	1997 – preserved as a museum ship in the Marinmuseum, Karlskrona
T137	Umeå	15 Jan 1975	1998
T138	Piteå	12 May 1975	2003 (modernised)
T139	Luleå	19 Aug 1975	2000's (modernised)
T140	Halmstad	17 Oct 1975	2005 (modernised)
T141	Strömstad	26 Apr 1976	2005
T142	Ystad	3 Sep 1976	2005 (modernised)
