= RBS 15 =

Swedish air or surface to surface missile

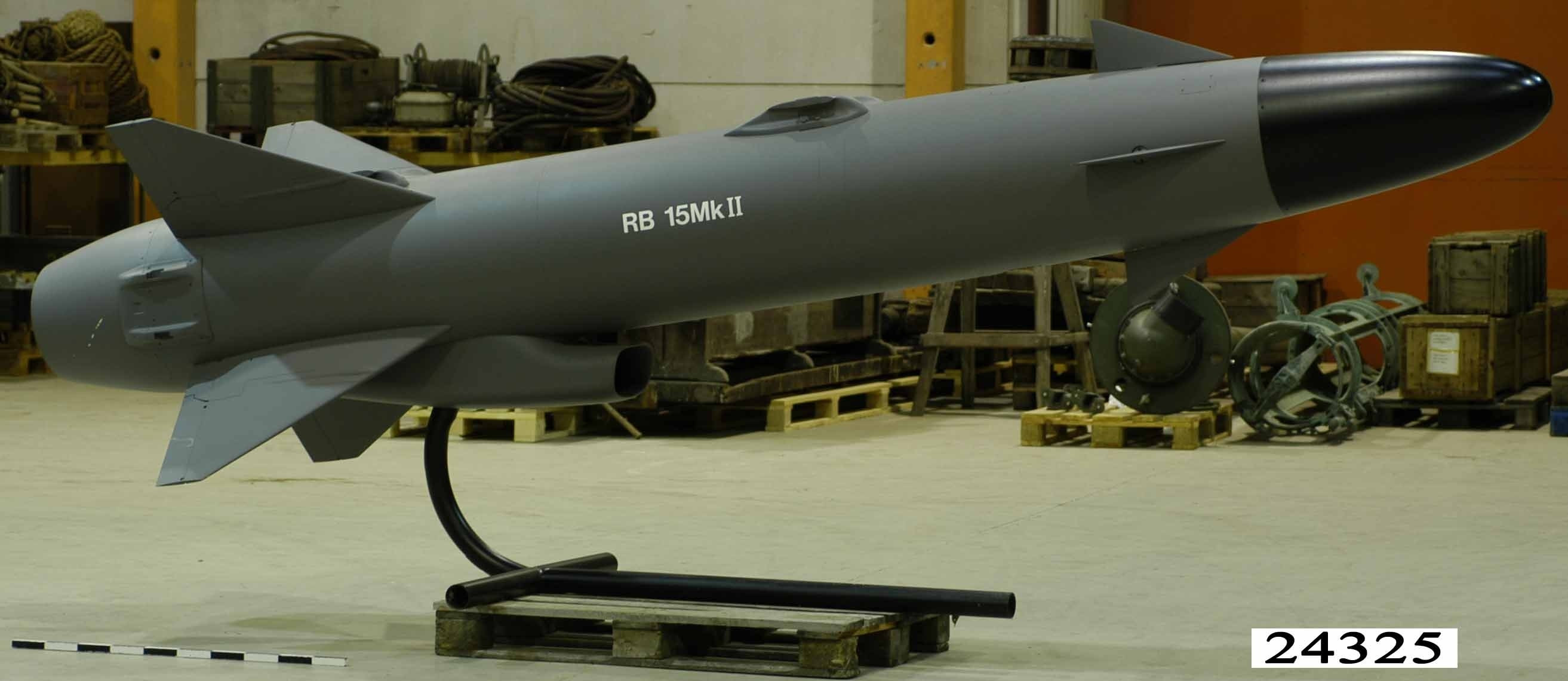
- RBS 15
- Type: RBS 15 Mk1: Anti-ship cruise missile (air-launched and ship-launched) RBS 15 Mk2: Anti-ship cruise missile(ship-launched and coastal defence truck-launched) RBS 15 Mk3: Anti-ship cruise missile and land-attack cruise missile (ship-launched and coastal defence truck-launched) RBS 15 Mk4: Anti-ship cruise missile and land-attack cruise missile (air-launched, ship-launched and coastal defence truck-launched)
- Place of origin: Sweden; Germany

Service history
- In service: 1984–present
- Used by: See Operators

Production history
- Manufacturer: Saab Bofors Dynamics, Diehl Defence

Specifications
- Mass: RBS 15 Mk1: 746 kg (1,645 lb) (with boosters); 568 kg (1,252 lb) (in flight); RBS 15 Mk2: 755 kg (1,664 lb) (with boosters); 577 kg (1,272 lb) (in flight); RBS 15 Mk3: 820 kg (1,810 lb) (with boosters); 660 kg (1,460 lb) (in flight); RBS 15 Mk4: 810 kg (1,790 lb) (with boosters); 650 kg (1,430 lb) (in flight)
- Length: 4,350 mm (14 ft 3 in)
- Diameter: 500 mm (1 ft 8 in)
- Wingspan: 1,400 mm (4 ft 7 in)
- Warhead: 200 kg (440 lb) HE blast and pre-fragmented warhead
- Detonation mechanism: Impact or proximity
- Engine: Turbojet
- Operational range: RBS 15 Mk1: 70 km (43 mi) RBS 15 Mk2: 100 km (62 mi) RBS 15 Mk3: > 200 km (120 mi) RBS 15 Mk4: > 300 km (190 mi)
- Flight altitude: Sea skimming
- Maximum speed: 0.9 Mach (1111 km/h) subsonic
- Guidance system: RBS 15 Mk1: 70 km (43 mi): Navigation: INS; Target homing: J-band pulse radar; RBS 15 Mk2: 100 km (62 mi): Navigation: INS; Target homing: J-band pulse radar; RBS 15 Mk3: > 200 km (120 mi): Navigation: INS + GPS, multiple 3D waypoints; Target homing: J-band active radar homing with ECCM+; RBS 15 Mk4: > 300 km (190 mi): Navigation: INS + anti-jam GPS, multiple 3D waypoints; Target homing: J-band active digital radar homing
- Launch platform: Naval ships, aircraft and land-based missile launchers

The RBS 15 (Robotsystem 15) is a long-range fire-and-forget surface-to-surface and air-to-surface anti-ship missile. The later version Mk. IV has the ability to attack land targets as well. The missile was developed by the Swedish company Saab Bofors Dynamics.

== History ==
The Swedish Navy earlier made the RB 08 anti-ship missiles with the Halland-class destroyers in the early 1960s. The main effect of Sweden's defence resolution of 1958 for the Swedish navy was restructuring into a lighter force consisting of fast attack craft (FAC) vessels - mainly the Norrköping-class missile boat - and a halt to destroyer procurement. This posed a problem as the existing RB 08 missile required launch rails and a missile magazine in the destroyers, taking up space that was not available in smaller ships. Adding to the problems, each missile had to be individually prepared for launch and only two missiles could be on the launch rails at the same time. In comparison, the P-15 Termit (NATO codename Styx) missile used by the Soviet Union from the late 1950s (which was the expected adversary of RBS 15) stored the missiles in individual containers on deck with the missiles immediately available for launch. Tests were carried out on Plejad class FACs with a single bow-mounted RB 08 in the late 1960s, but they came to nothing.

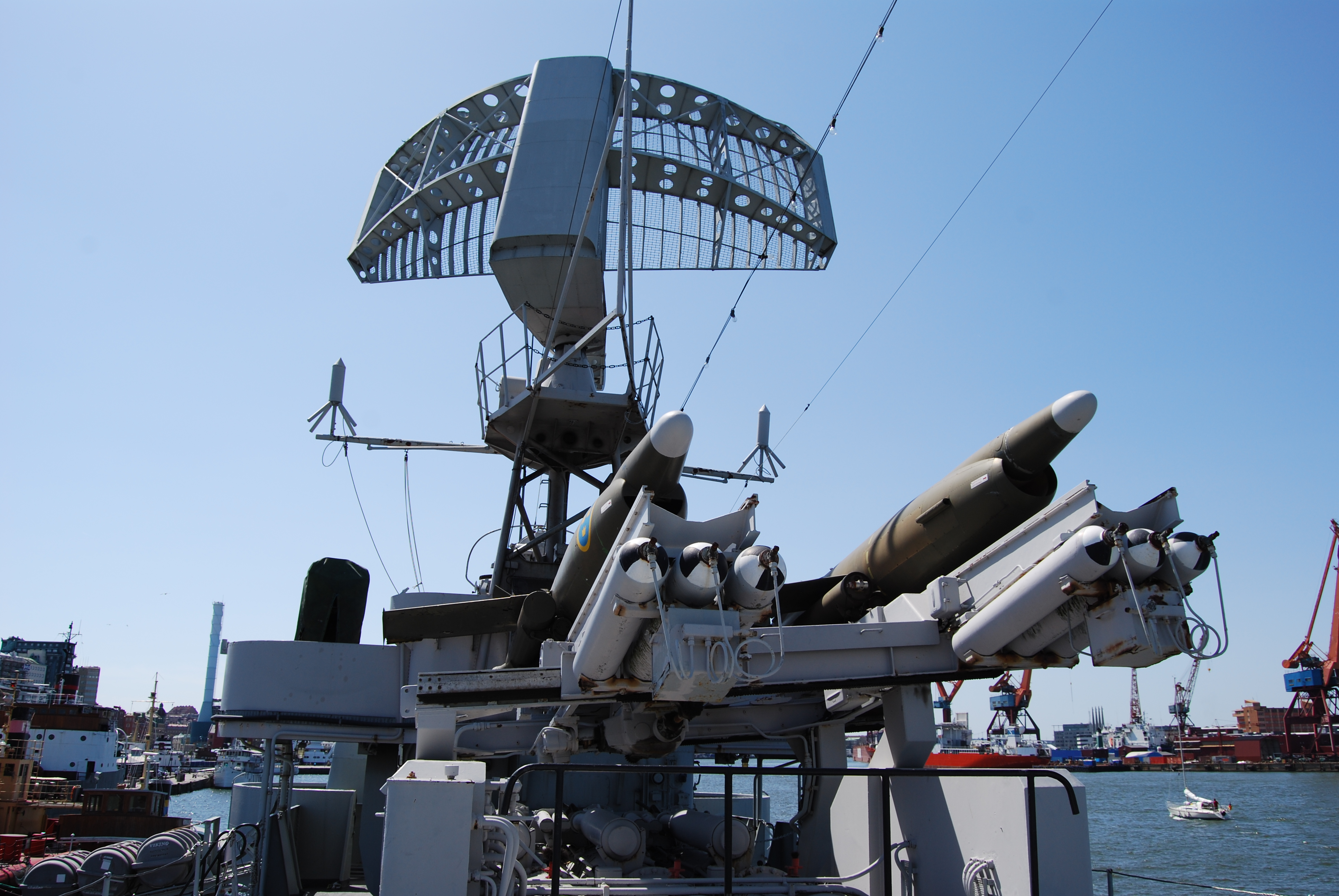
HSwMS Småland, radar and two RB 08 missiles

Saab's next attempt at anti-ship missiles to equip the FACs of the Swedish navy was in 1978 under the project name "RB 04 Turbo", a development of the air force RB 04E missile with a turbofan engine, changed wing configuration and start rockets to take off from land, while the front of the missile was retained, including the warhead. The initial proposal was rejected as inferior to the Harpoon missile. The project, under the leadership of Hans Ahlinder, was then reworked into a missile with improved capabilities to surpass than the Harpoon. To indicate that it was a new weapon, the name was changed to "RBS 15".

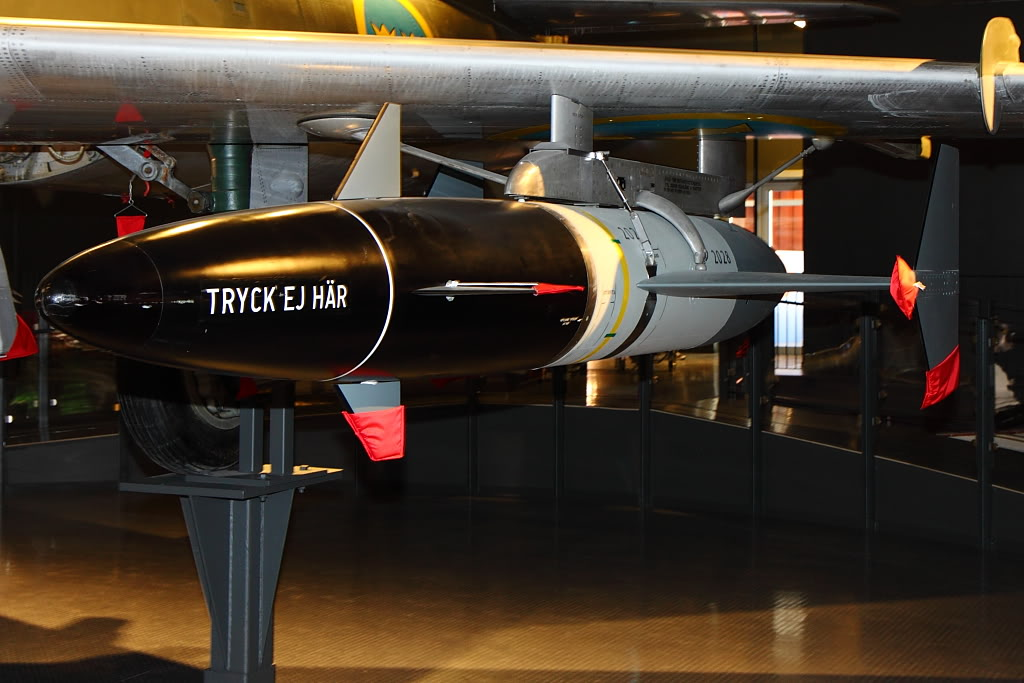
RB 04 missile

The first weapon contract was signed in 1979; at the last minute the Swedish government did not buy the Harpoon anti-ship missile, opting for an indigenous design. The RBS 15 underwent trials on the missile FAC HSwMS Piteå from 1983, the first missiles were delivered to the Navy in June 1984, and became operational with the Swedish Navy in 1985 as the RBS 15 Mk. I. The Västergötland-class submarines were to have four vertical missile launch tubes for RBS 15 missiles in an extended hull, canceled due to budget constraints and to not fitting the way Swedish submarines operated.

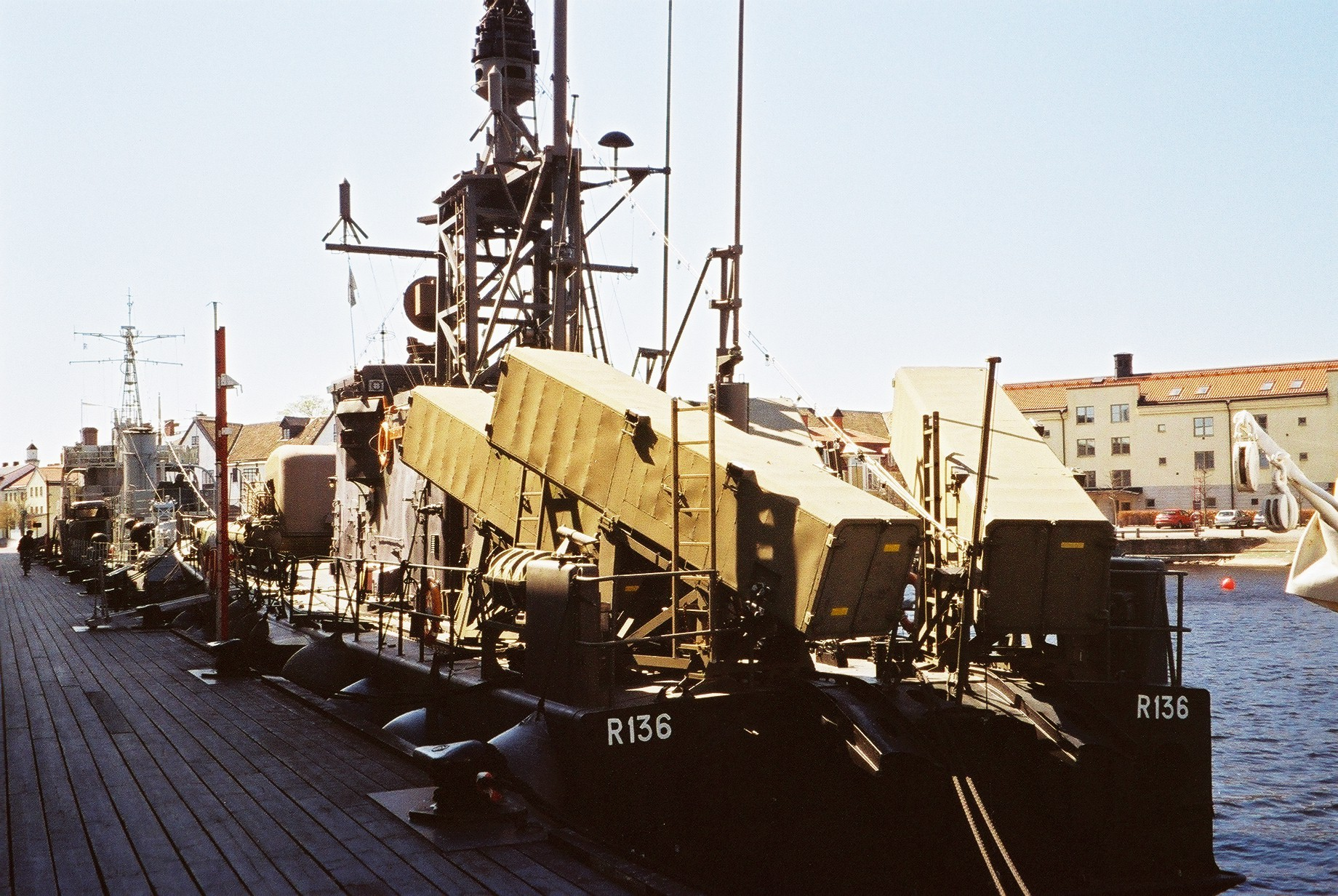
RBS 15 Mk 1 on Swedish missile boat HSwMS Västervik

The Swedish Navy ordered the missile in 1984 to develop a coastal defense version of the RBS 15F. The missile was taken into Swedish Navy service as the 'Rb 15 by the Swedish Navy and became operational in 1985. The Swedish Air Force received their missiles a couple of years later. The original RBS 15 Mk. I was produced from 1985 to 1990.

Work on a further developed version, the RBS 15 Mk. II, began in the early 1980s, but it took until 1994 to get a development contract for the upgraded anti-ship missile. The Mk. II has the same range (70+ km), but the mid-course and terminal guidance system, as well as the radar and IR signature were upgraded. The Mk. II has been produced since 1998.

Development of the RBS 15 Mk. III began in the mid-1990s. It is produced by Saab in co-operation with Diehl Defence of Germany. Emphasis was put on increased range (due to larger fuel capacity and new fuel the range has been increased to some 200 km), improved accuracy (integrated GPS) and selectable priority targeting, which improved the weapon system's flexibility. The Mk. III was selected for the German Navy's Braunschweig-class corvettes. Finnish truck maker Sisu produces missile launch trucks for RBS 15. The Mk. III has been in production since 2004.

In March 2017 Saab received an order for a new generation anti-ship missile to replace the RBS 15, valued at 3.2 billion SEK. The following year, SAAB unveiled the RBS 15 Mk. IV Gungnir, again produced with Diehl. Unlike Mk. III, the Mk. IV Gungnir can be fired from a truck, making it capable of launching from air, sea, or land. Gungnir missiles have been ordered for the Swedish Navy, with the first weapons scheduled for delivery in the mid-2020s.

== Variants ==
The RBS15 exists in various generations, and each generation has various launch platform options.

=== RBS15 - first generation ===
Variants of the first generation:

- Air-launched: RBS-15F, launched exclusively from Swedish fighters (AJS37 Viggen, Fpl AJ37 Viggen, JAS-39 Gripen)
- Ship launched: RBS15 Mk1

Design:

- Propulsion:
  - Turbojet engine: Microturbo TRI 60-2 077, with a 3.7 kN (830 lbf) thrust.
  - 2 × solid-fuel rocket boosters (for surface launched variants)

=== RBS15 - second generation ===
Variants of the second generation:

- Ship launched: RBS15 Mk2
- Coastal defence: RBS15 SF
  - MTO 85 (Meritorjuntaohjus 1985, Finland)
  - RBS15 KA (Sweden)

Design:

- Propulsion:
  - Turbojet engine: Microturbo TRI 60-2 277, with a 3.7 kN (830 lbf) thrust.
  - 2 × solid-fuel rocket boosters (for surface launched variants)

=== RBS15 - third generation ===
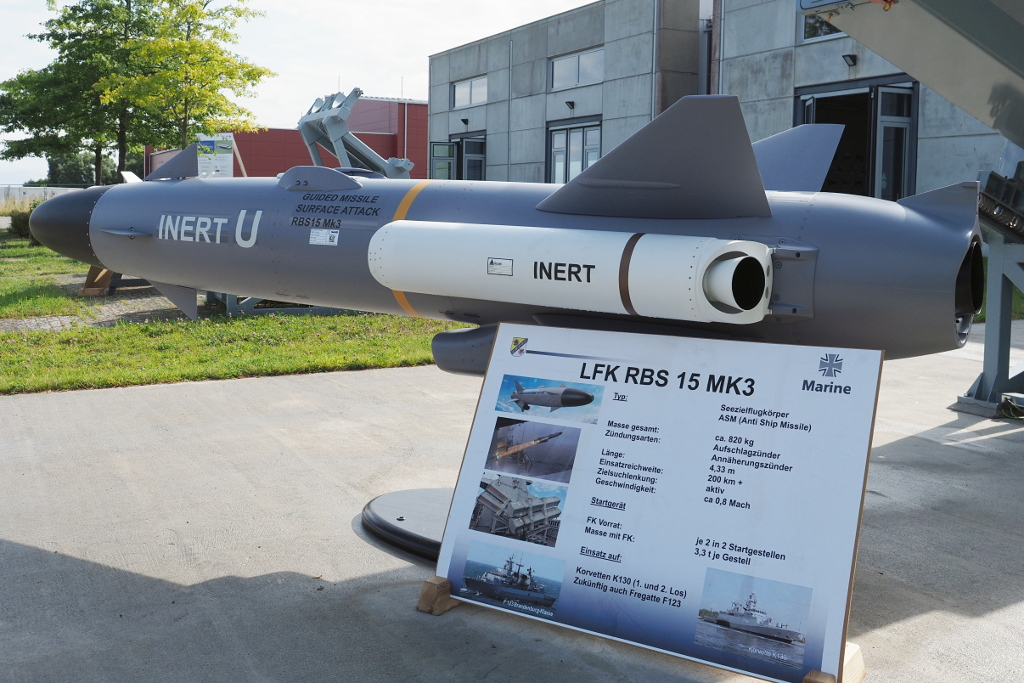
RBS 15 Mk3

Variants of the third generation:

- Ship launched: RBS15 Mk3
- Coastal defence: RBS-15 SF-3
  - MTO 85M (Meritorjuntaohjus 1985M, Finland), modernised variant of the coastal defence system, equipped with the RBS-15 SF-3 missile. They use new missile and refurbished Mk2 missiles.
  - Saab CDMS (Coastal Defence Missile System), using the same missile as the ship-launched RBS15 Mk3, and will be able to launch the future RBS15 generation.

Design:

- Propulsion:
  - Turbojet engine: Microturbo TRI 60-5, with a 4.4 kN (990 lbf) thrust.
  - 2 × solid-fuel rocket boosters (for surface launched variants)

=== RBS15 - fourth generation ===
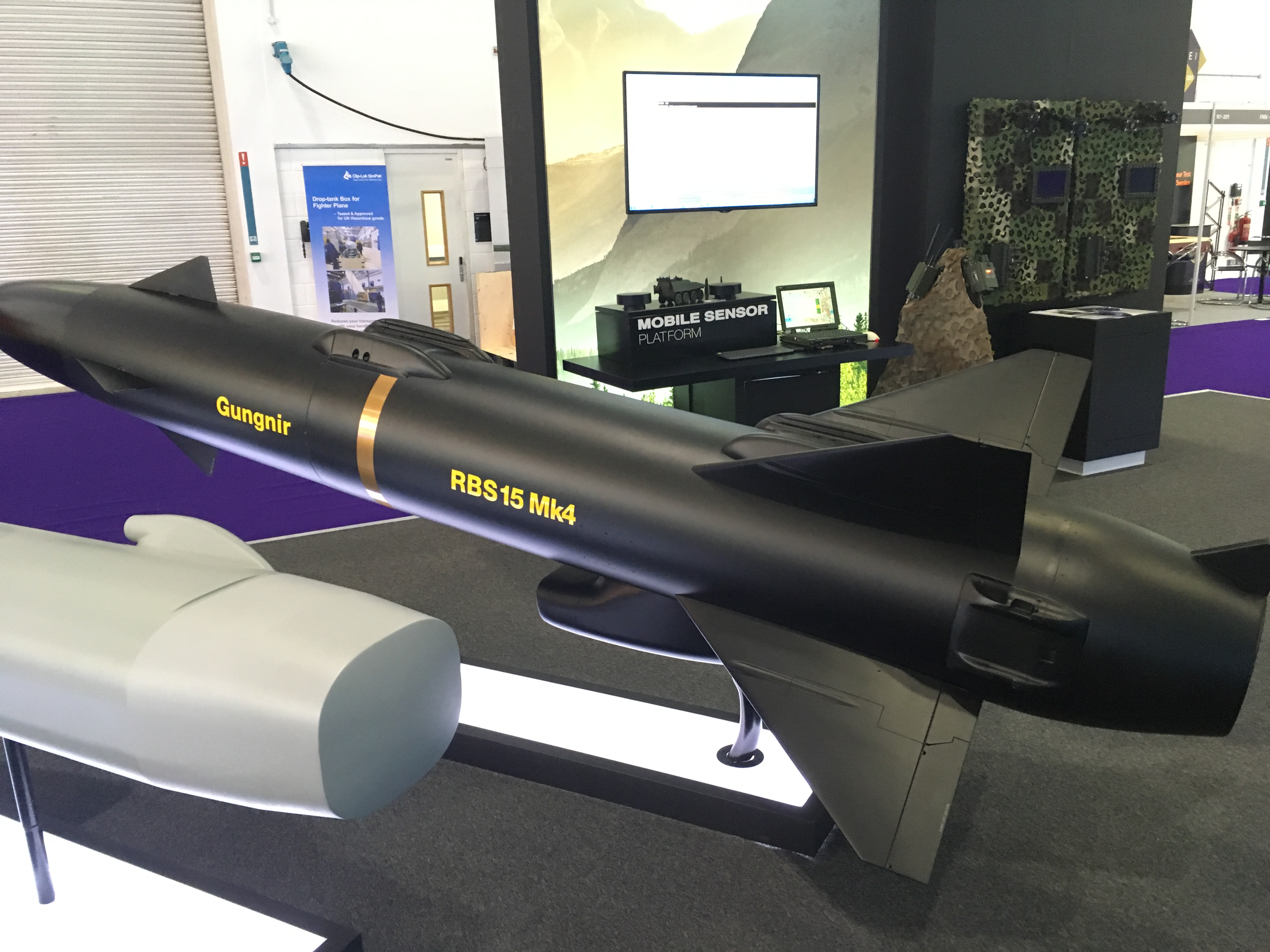
RBS 15 Mk4 on the DSEI 2019

Variants of the fourth generation known as the RBS15 Gungnir :

- Air-launched: RBS15 Mk4 Air (known as RBS-15 ER in the Swedish Air Force), a missile in development as of 2026, to be launched from JAS-39 Gripen C/D, JAS-39 Gripen E/F, Saab Swordfish and other maritime patrol aircraft.
- Ship launched: RBS15 Mk4 Gungnir
- Coastal defence: Saab CDMS (Coastal Defence Missile System), using the same missile as the ship-launched RBS15 Mk4 gungnir

== Operators ==
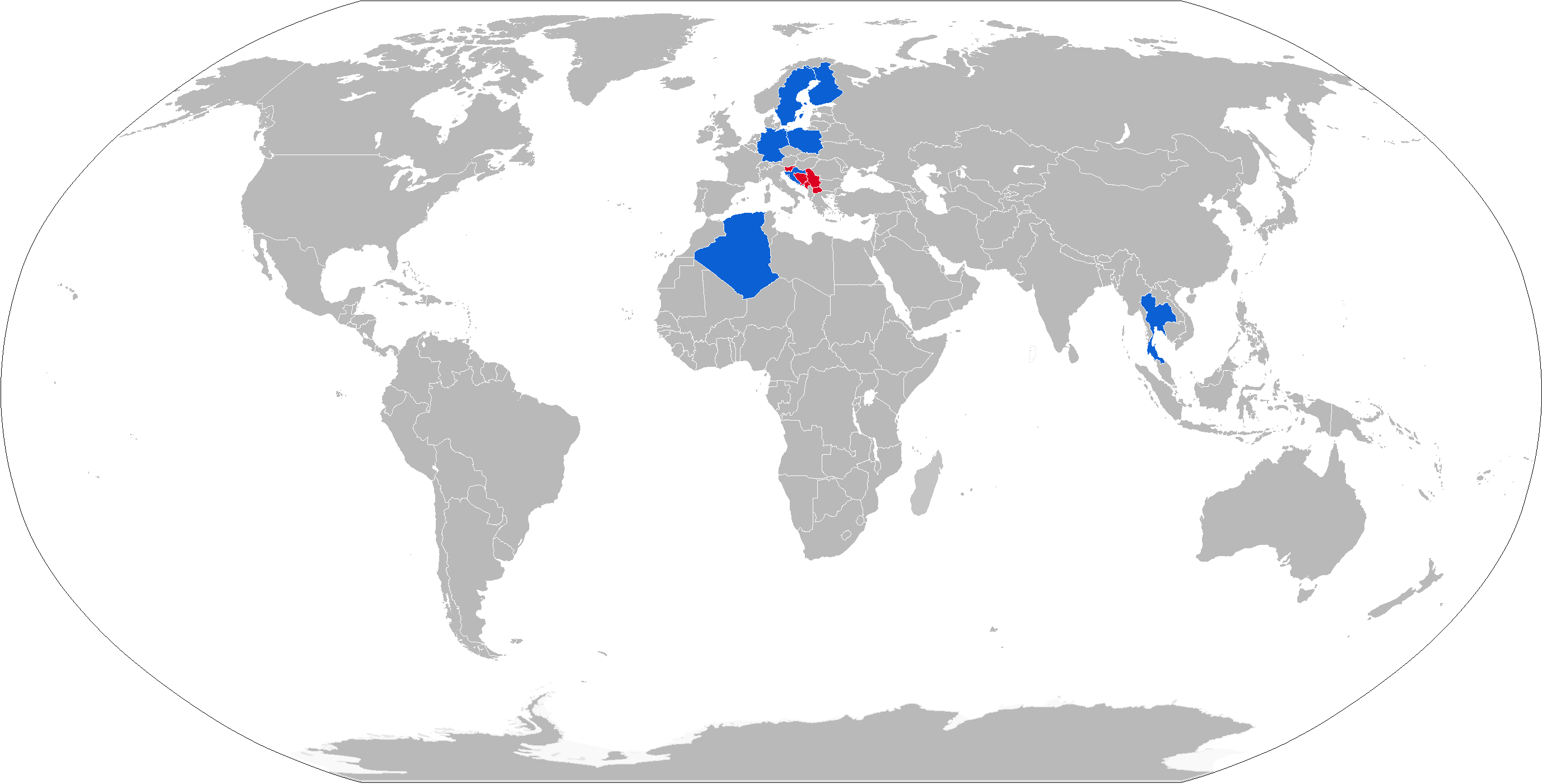
Operators Current Former

=== Current operators ===
==== Air-launched missiles ====
Sweden
The Swedish Air Force operates the first generation of air-launched RBS 15F. It was first operated from the AJ37 Viggen. It was later operated from the Gripen C/D.
The RBS 15 Mk4 Gungnir (RBS15 Mk4 Air / RBS-15 ER) will be operated from both the Gripen C/D and the Gripen E/F.
- In March 2017, the FMV signed a contract with Saab, worth SEK 3.2 billion, for the development and production of RBS 15 Mk4 missiles in air-launched and surface launched configurations.
- In April 2017, a complementary order worth was signed.SEK 0.5 billion
Thailand
As a part of its Gripen C/D procurement program, the Royal Thai Air Force ordered the air-launch version, the RBS 15F, to equip its Gripen fighter aircraft.

==== Ship-launched missiles ====
Algeria (65 RBS15 Mk3)

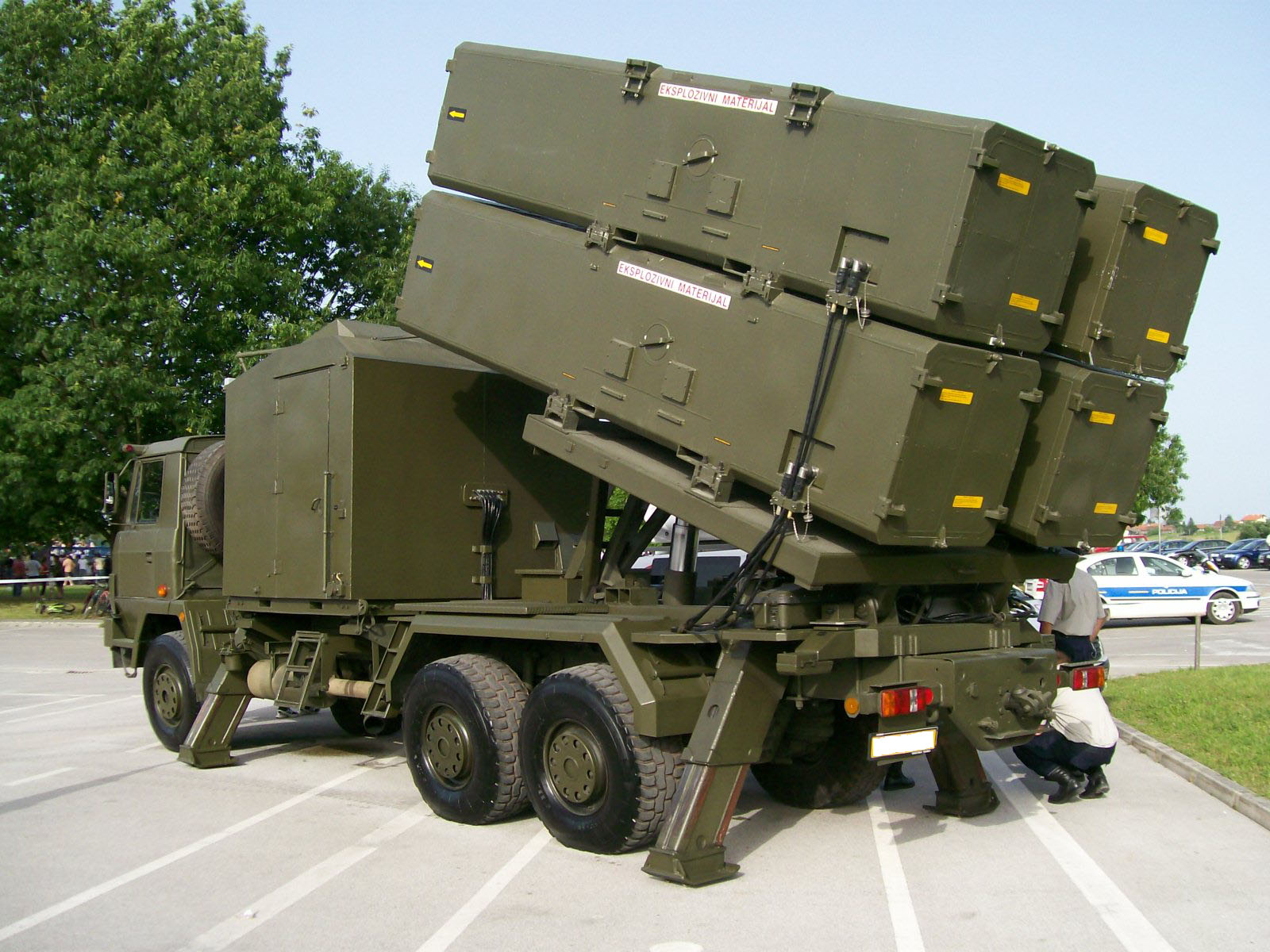
Croatian MOL with RBS 15 missiles

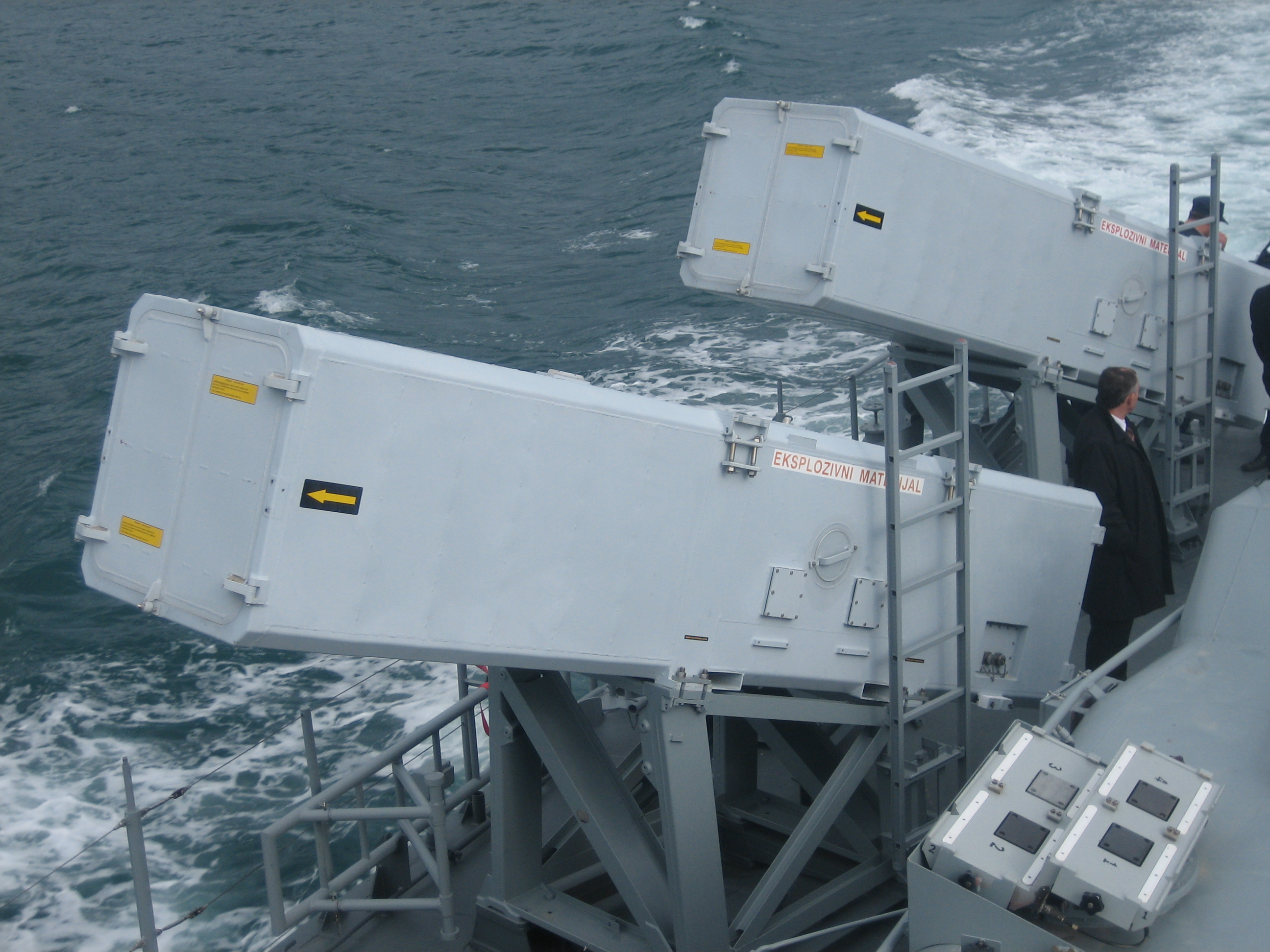
Croatian missile boat RTOP-41 Vukovar with RBS 15 missiles

The RBS15 Mk3 purchased by the Algerian National Navy are used with two MEKO 200 frigates which was ordered in March 2012, making Algeria the first non-European missile .
Bulgaria
In August 2022, the Bulgarian government decided to purchase RBS15 Mk3 for two patrol ships of the Bulgarian navy.
The first ship, the Hrabri (12), of the MMPV 90 class, entered service in December 2025. The ships are equipped with two twin-missile launchers.
Croatia
Primary weapon of the Croatian Navy for its five guided missile boats and three coastal systems mounted on Tatra trucks. In total, 48 Mk.I units are in service. Plans for upgrading 21 missiles to a standard incorporating elements from both the Mk.II and the Mk.III versions was cancelled in 2009 due to budget restraints but light software upgrades were continuously executed and have improved the missiles' navigation, precision and electronic defence. The latest of this upgrades was conducted in 2010 as part of usual service works. Unexpectedly though, in August 2014 the Croatian government decided to send at least 20 Croatian RBS 15 missiles through an overhaul program so as to keep them operational and current for another 10 years. The missiles are to receive upgrades to increase their range to about 90–100 km as well as to improve their guidance, precision and survivability against jamming. The missiles were successfully launched and destroyed their targets in live fire naval exercises in 2015, 2016 and 2018.
Finland

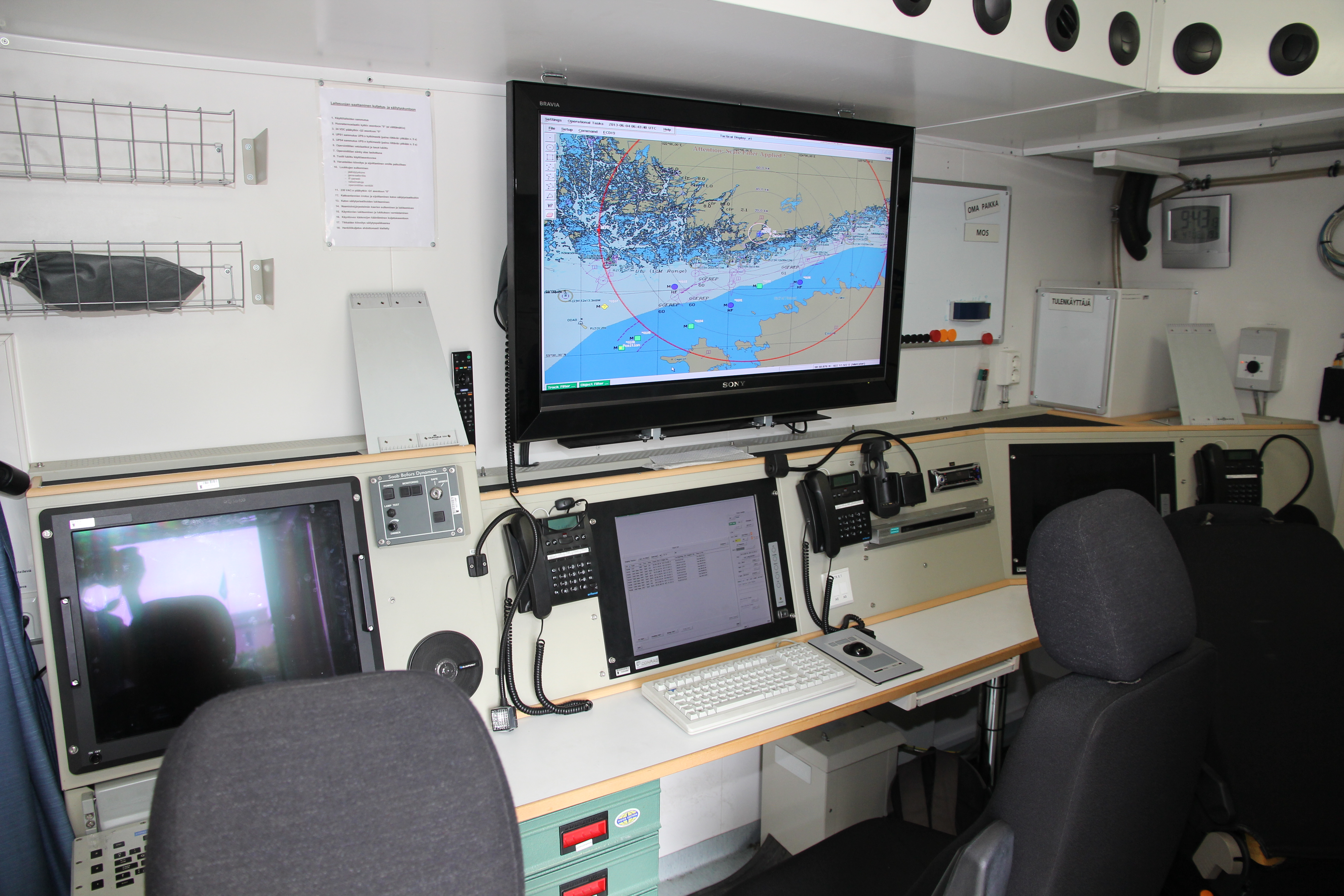
MTO 85M coastal defence command vehicle

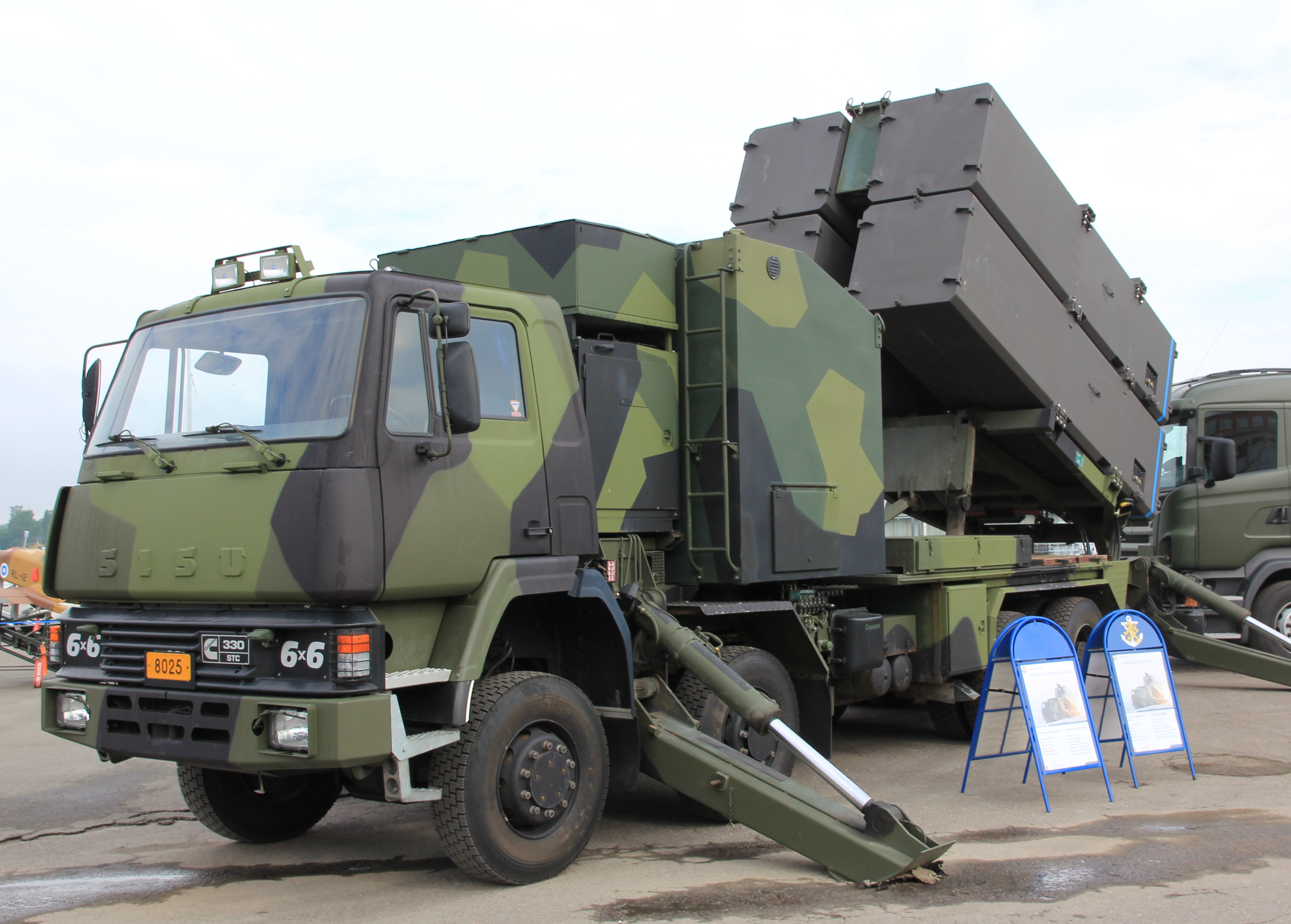
Finnish MTO-85M launch vehicle

The Finnish Navy purchased the RBS15 Mk2 in the ship-launched version, and the RBS15 SF, the coastal defence variant. The missile was ordered in 1983, and locally designed as the MTO 85 (Meritorjuntaohjus 1985, Finland). It succeeded to the MTO-66 (P-15 Termit).
In 2001, Finland ordered the RBS15 Mk3 to Saab (also known as the MTO 85M, or the RBS15 SF3), for a contract worth SEK500 million. This contract includes the modernisation of existing missiles and the purchase of new ones.
In 2003, Finland selected this MTO 85M missile to equip its new Hamina-class missile boat.
The Finnish Navy is progressively retiring RBS15 missiles and missile systems. The MTO 85M will remain in service with the Rauma-class missile boats until their retirement, when replaced by the Pohjanmaa-class corvettes.
The MTO 85 and MTO 85M are partially phased out in Finland. The missiles are not in use with the following systems.
- Ships:
  - Hamina-class missile boat: MLU on the ship, it includes the replacement of the 6 × RBS-15 SF III (MTO 85M) with the Gabriel V missile (PTO2020) missiles.
  - Helsinki-class missile boat: Helsinki-class missile boat: 4 ships purchased and commissioned between 1981 and 1985, all equipped with 2 × 4 RBS15 Mk2 launchers. The ships were modernised to use the RBS15 Mk3 missiles. Two out of four ships were scrapped in 2002, and the two other were retired in 2008. Note: two of the ships were sold to Croatia in 2008 (the Oulu became the RTOP-41 Vukovar, the Kotka became the RTOP-42 Dubrovnik), and they are now equipped with RBS15 Mk3 modernised missiles.
- Coastal defence system:
  - The coastal defence system was developed from 1983. The project was known as RAMETO. It is based on a Sisu SK242 truck chassis, and the fire control system was developed locally. It entered service in 1987. Four batteries were procured in total. The systems are replaced with the Gabriel V missile (PTO2020) missiles, and some batteries were donated to Ukraine.
Germany

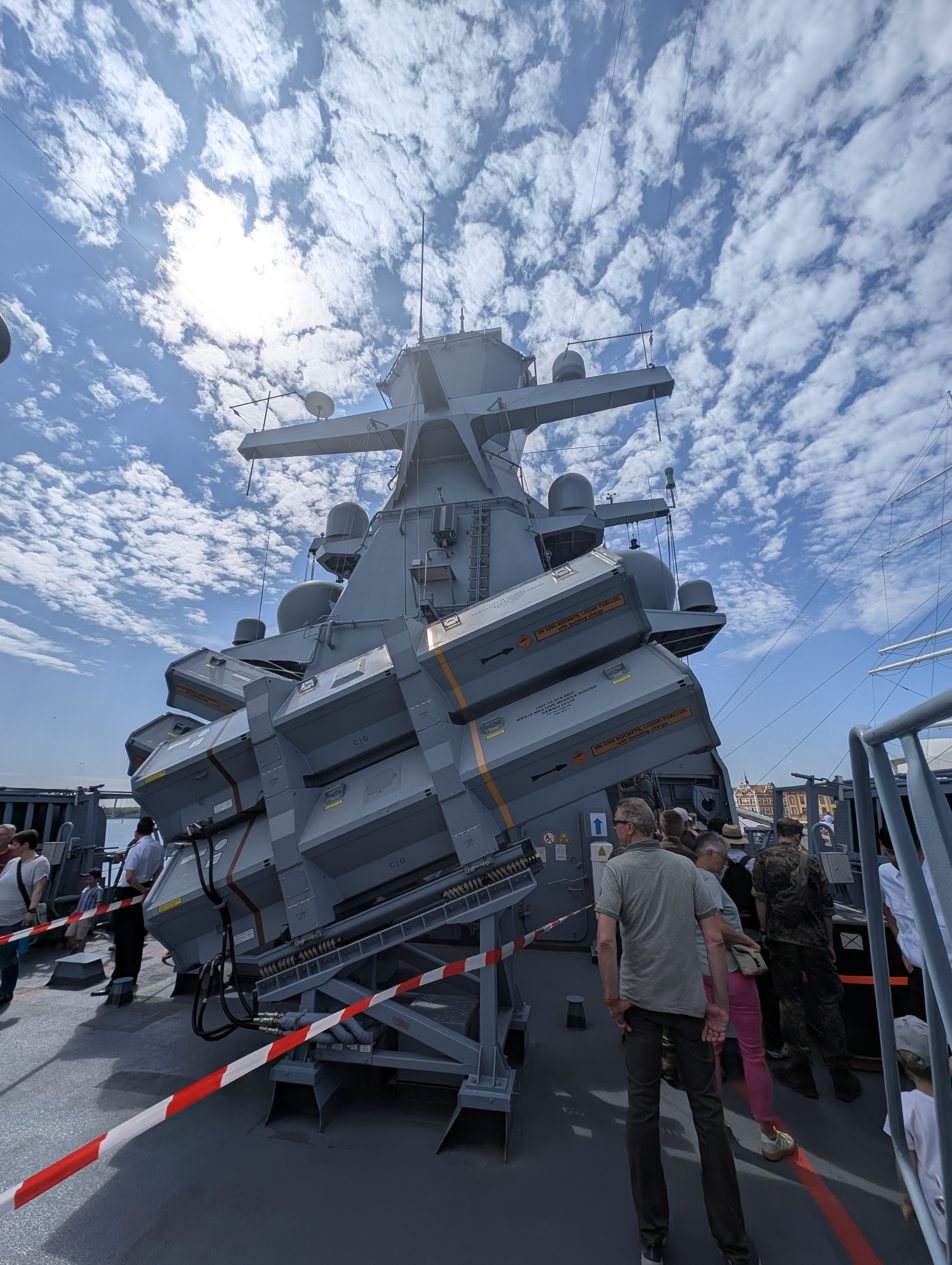
Braunschweig-class (K130) corvette with RBS 15 Mk3 missiles

The German Navy has chosen the Mk. III to equip its Braunschweig-class corvettes in 2005. Saab has received an additional order from its German partner Diehl Defence for the RBS 15 anti-ship missile for provision to the German Navy, with an order value of approximately 1.7 BSEK with deliveries between 2022 and 2026.
In 2005, the German Navy selected the RBS 15 Mk3 missile to equip the Braunschweig class (corvette, Type K130 - Batch 1) which was being developed by Saab and Diehl BGT. The production started in Germany in 2008, and the deliveries started in March 2011. The K130 is equipped with 2 × 2 missiles.
In August 2018, the German Navy ordered the RBS15 systems and launchers for the second batch of the K130 corvettes.
In October 2023, the German Navy selected the RBS15 Mk3 to replace the Harpoon missiles of the Brandenburg class (Type F123) as part of their MLU .
Summary of orders:
- September 2005, contract signed for RBS15 Mk3 missiles worth SEK350 million with the German Navy.
- August 2012, contract signed by Saab with Diehl Defence for RBS15 Mk3 missiles worth €20 million (SEK168 million).
- December 2012, contract signed by Saab with Diehl Defence for RBS15 Mk3 missiles worth SEK615 million. for the German Navy for 30 missiles.
- Framework agreement for up to 160 missiles, signed in September 2020, worth €285 million, for orders possible until the end of 2024 and deliveries from 2022 to 2026. Orders within the framework agreement:
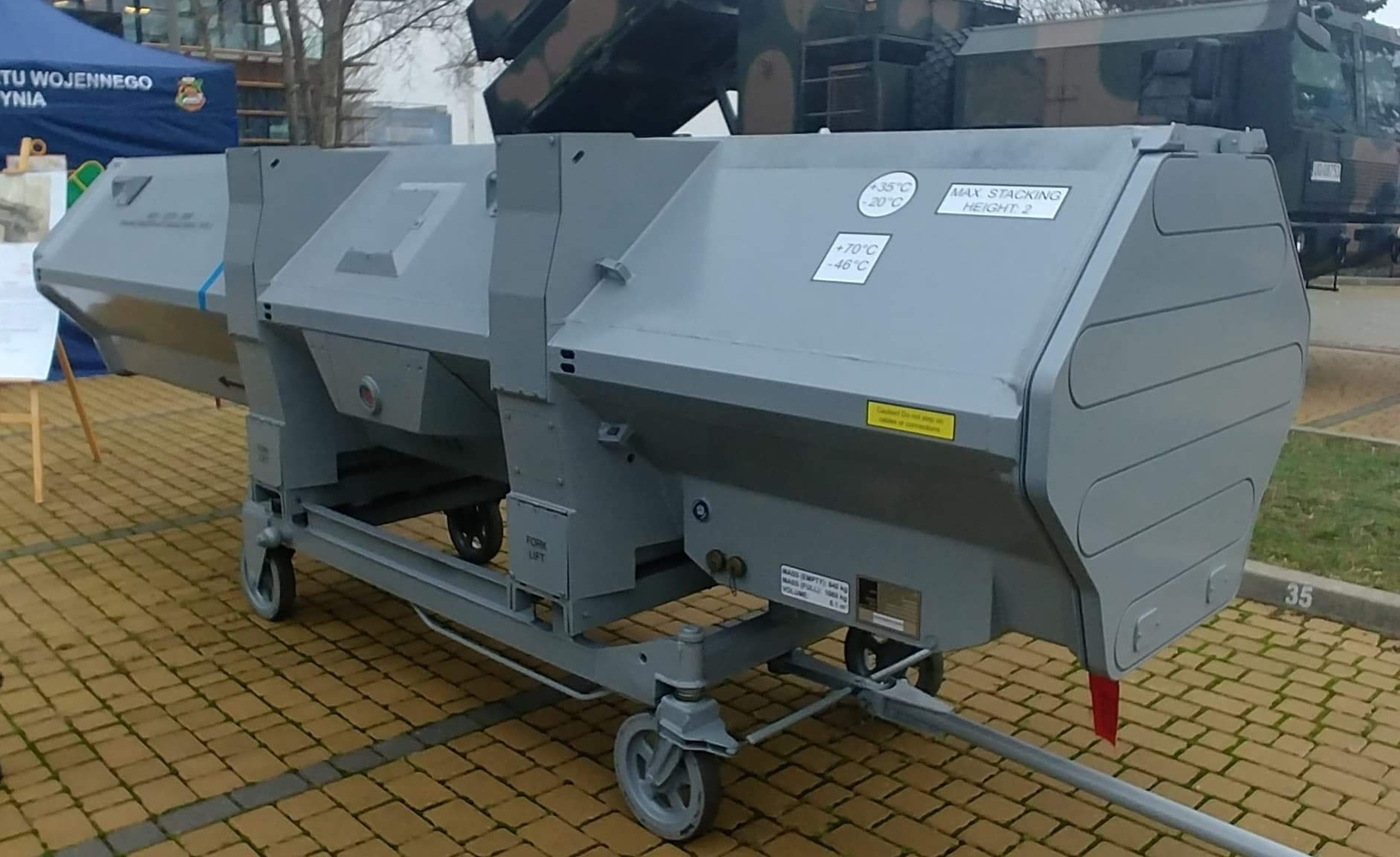
  RBS15 Mk3 canisters for the Polish Navy ships
  - September 2020: among the 160 missiles under framework, 75 were ordered (€140 million).
Poland
The Polish Navy operates three Orkan-class fast attack craft equipped with the RBS 15 Mk3. The missiles were ordered in 2006 to Saab Bofors Dynamics, worth €110 million and include the launching systems. The RBS 15 Mk2 was used as interim armament on the ships, the Mk3 were first deployed in 2014.
Note: initially, the Miecznik (Type 31 / Arrowhead 140) was supposed to be equipped with the RBS 15 Mk3, but in the end the NSM was chosen.
Sweden
The Swedish Navy operates multiple variants of the RBS 15:
- Ship-launched RBS 15:
  - RBS 15 Mk2
    - Gävle class corvette (2 × 4 launchers)
    - Stockholm-class corvette (2 × 4 launchers)
    - Visby-class corvette
  - RBS 15 Mk4: In March 2017, the FMV signed a contract with Saab, worth SEK 3.2 billion, for the development and production of new generation of missiles in its air-launched and surface launched configurations for the Visby class. In April 2017, a complementary order worth was signed.SEK 0.5 billion
    - Visby-class corvette: As part of a midlife upgrade to receive new capabilities, a new hatch is created for the EBS 15 Mk4, it will enable their integration while maintaining the stealth.
    - Luleå-class frigate: The FMV selected the FDI platform as the future flagship of the Navy in May 2026. The RBS 15 Mk4 is part of the Swedish weapons to be integrated on the ship.
- Swedish Coastal Artillery:
  - RB 15KA batteries: Made of six Scania P113 8×6 missile launcher trucks, each equipped with a quad-missile launcher, accompanied with a PS-902 radar. Service life:
    - Introduced in 1995.
    - Decommissioned in 2000.
    - Reintroduced in 2016.
    - 2024: decision to include the RBS 15 Mk3 missiles and to have new launch vehicles (Saab CDMS), in a contract worth SEK 800 million signed in 2024.
Ukraine
The Finnish government donated at least one coastal defence system to Ukraine during Russo-Ukrainian war.

=== Potential operators ===
==== Air launched missiles ====
Colombia
Colombia ordered 15 Gripen E and 2 Gripen F in November 2025. They might have an interest in the anti-ship defence to protect its Atlantic and its Pacific ocean coasts.
Thailand
Thailand ordered the Gripen E/F in 2025, and the RBS 15 Mk4 Gungnir (RBS15 Mk4 Air) might be part of the armament package to protect the vast maritime territory of the nation.
Ukraine
Sweden announced the support to Ukraine with 16 Gripen C/D to be donated in 2027. RBS-15 F might be donated to be operated from them. Ukraine also ordered 16 Gripen E aircraft in July 2026, and both the Gripen C/D and the Gripen E might operate RBS15 Mk4 Air (known as RBS-15 ER in the Swedish Air Force).

=== Retired systems / former operators ===
Yugoslavia
Yugoslavia ordered the first generation of RBS15 missiles in two roles:
- Coastal defence: RBS15B coastal defence system
- Ship-launched missiles, from fast attack craft (Šibenik missile boat and the Kralj class)
Croatia recovered the equipment after secession from Yugoslavia. The systems were captured during the Croatian War of Independence. Today the systems remain active, but with the Croatian Navy.

== See also ==
- AGM-158C LRASM – (United States)
- ASM-3 – (Japan)
- Babur – (Pakistan)
- Blue Spear – (Israel)
- Exocet – (France)
- Harpoon – (United States)
- Kh-35 – (Russia)
- Naval Strike Missile – (Norway)
- R-360 Neptune – (Ukraine)
- Otomat – (Italy, France)
- NASM-MR – (India)
- Sea Eagle – (United Kingdom)
- Type 80 air-to-ship missile – (Japan)
- Type 88 surface-to-ship missile – (Japan)
- Type 90 ship-to-ship missile – (Japan)
- Type 93 air-to-ship missile – (Japan)
- YJ-83 – (China)
