= HSwMS Västervik =

Swedish museum ship

Coordinates: 56°09′43″N 15°35′59″E

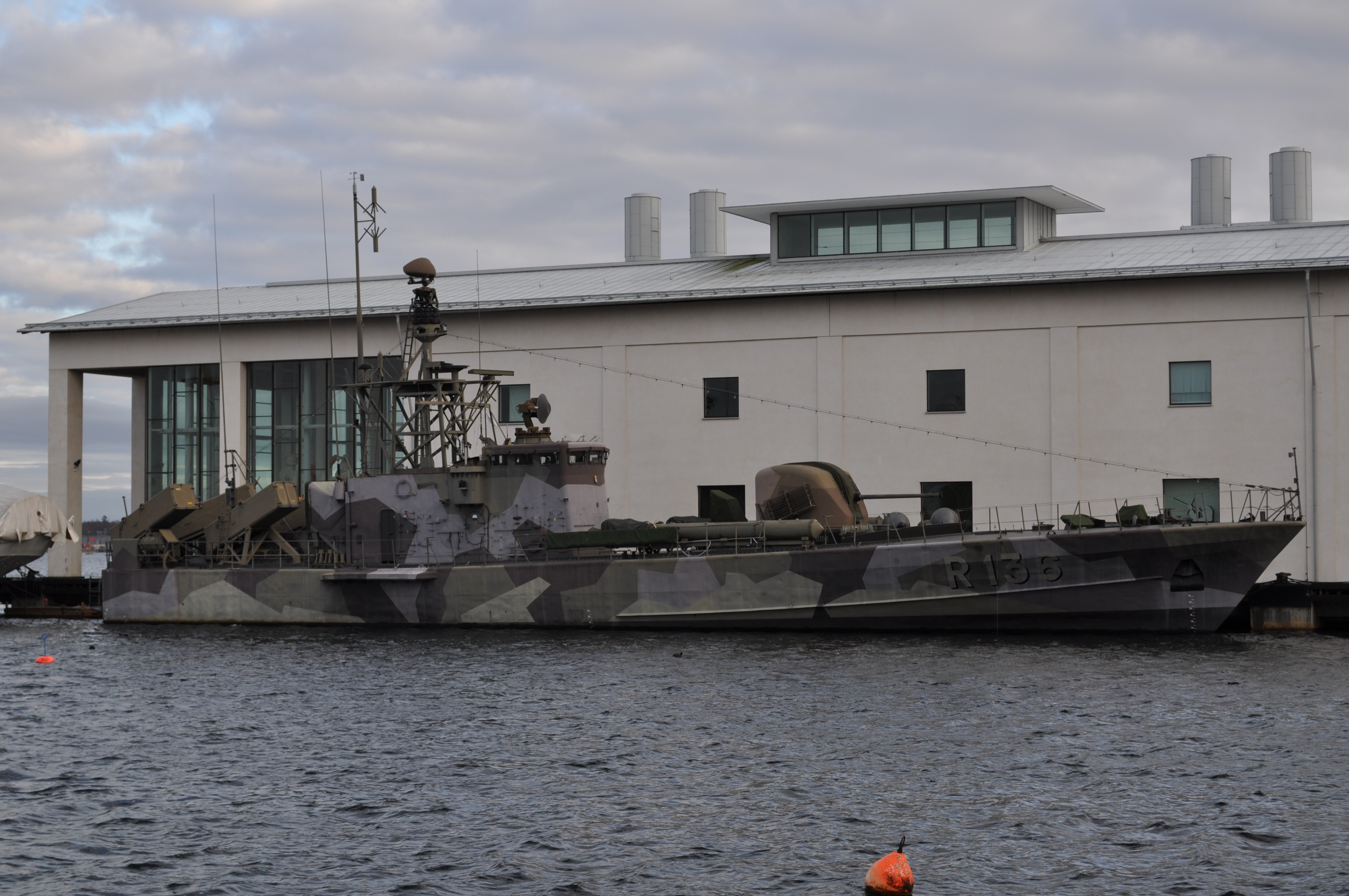
- The former HSwMS Västervik as a museum ship in 2009

History

Sweden
- Name: Västervik
- Namesake: Västervik
- Builder: Karlskrona Navy Yard
- Launched: 2 September 1974
- Commissioned: 15 January 1975
- Out of service: 1997
- Fate: Preserved as a museum ship
- Badge

General characteristics
- Type: Torpedo boat
- Displacement: Standard: 220 long tons (250 short tons); Full load: 255 long tons (286 short tons)
- Length: wl: 42.0 metres (137.8 ft); oa: 43.6 metres (143 ft)
- Beam: 7.1 metres (23 ft)
- Draft: 1.6 metres (5.2 ft)
- Installed power: 12,750 shaft horsepower (9,510 kW)
- Speed: Top: 40 knots (74 km/h; 46 mph)
- Complement: 28
- Armament: At launch: 6 × 533 mm (21.0 in) torpedo tubes; 1 × 57 mm (2.2 inches) main gun; Refit: 8 × RBS 15 ASMs; 2 × 533 mm (21.0 in) torpedo tubes; 1 × 57 mm (2.2 inches) main gun

HSwMS Västervik (T-136/R-136) is a Norrköping-class missile boat and museum ship at the Marinmuseum in Karlskrona, Sweden. Launched in 1974, the ship was built as part of a new doctrine intended to use small and maneuverable vessels to defend the Swedish coast. Throughout the Cold War, she helped to maintain Swedish neutrality; in one incident, she formed part of the Swedish response to the grounding of Soviet submarine S-363.

In the mid-1980s, she was fitted with anti-ship missiles in place of torpedo tubes. After she was passed over for another refit in the late 1990s, her last voyage was in 1997. The Marinmuseum acquired Västervik to serve as an exhibit about life on missile boats, which was open by 2002.

== Development and design ==
In the early Cold War, the Swedish Navy was one of the most powerful in the Baltic Sea as other regional powers slowly rebuilt after World War II. By 1960, the numerical superiority was lost and a new approach was needed. In response, the Defense Act of 1958 introduced the concept of a "light navy". Compared to the old navy that was built around capital ships, the doctrine emphasized escorts to protect the Swedish coast, with large torpedo boats slated to operate independently or serve in task forces with destroyers. The Navy then developed a new type of fast attack craft starting with the Plejad class in the 1950s, which served as the basis for the Spica class in the 1960s. The design modified in the early 1970s to include a new fire control system, which entered service as the dozen Specia II–class torpedo boats.

The Specia II class featured a waterline length of 42.0 metres (137.8 ft), overall length of 43.6 metres (143 ft), beam of 7.1 metres (23 ft), and a draft of 1.6 metres (5.2 ft). They were propelled by Rolls Royce gas turbine engines that produced 12,750 shaft horsepower (9,510 kW) for a top speed of 41 knots (76 km/h; 47 mph) through three controllable pitch propellers. Armament included six 533 mm (21.0 inches) torpedo tubes and a 57 mm (2.2 inches)-caliber main gun. The vessels had a standard displacement of 220 long tons (250 short tons), full load displacement of 255 long tons (286 short tons), and a crew of 28.

== History ==
Swedish language tour of Västervik produced by the Marinmuseum
- https://www.youtube.com/watch?v=hu3PGpAw3BU

Västervik was launched on 2 September 1974 by the Karlskrona Naval Base, which built every ship in the class. She was assigned the hull number T-136 and entered service on 15 January 1975. Every member of the class was named after a Swedish port city; Västervik is in Småland, south of Stockholm. In the early 1980s, every ship in the class was rebuilt, which included swapping out four torpedo tubes for four twin RBS 15 anti-ship missile launchers. With the new weapons, the class became known as the Norrköping-class missile boats to distinguish their new role. While in service, the ships patrolled the coast to maintain Swedish neutrality during the Cold War. In one notable incident, Soviet submarine S-363 ran aground and surfaced near the Swedish Navy base at Karlskrona in 1981. As part of the Swedish investigation, S-363's captain was interrogated onboard Västervik before the submarine was released the next day.

The class was initially intended to be withdrawn from service in 1993. Starting in 1995, half of the ships were refitted and modernized so they could be operated until 2010. Västervik was one of the six vessels excluded from the plan. Her last voyage with the Swedish Navy was a training cruise in December 1997. The Marinmuseum—a naval museum in Karlskrona—was interested in acquiring the ship and turning her into an exhibit about life on board a missile boat during the 1990s. To accurately depict living conditions, the crew was directed to leave behind personal items and leave everything untouched, such as trash in the trashcans or a child's drawing in the captain's quarters. Exceptions were made for sensitive military equipment, which was dismantled and removed. Ownership was transferred to the museum by 2002, although the Navy wanted to keep the ship out of the public eye to not give the impression that the Swedish Navy was composed of antique ships. The museum is currently open for guided tours.
