= DM2A4 =

- Type: Heavyweight dual-purpose ASW and ASuW torpedo
- Place of origin: Germany

Service history
- In service: 2004
- Used by: Germany, Greece, Argentina, Chile, Colombia, Ecuador, India, Indonesia, Israel, Norway, Pakistan, Peru, South Africa, South Korea, Spain, Turkey, United Arab Emirates, Venezuela

Production history
- Designer: Atlas Elektronik

Specifications
- Mass: 1530 kg
- Length: 6.6 m (22 ft)
- Diameter: 533mm
- Maximum firing range: 50 kilometres (27 nmi)
- Warhead: PBX
- Warhead weight: 260 kg
- Detonation mechanism: Proximity or contact detonation
- Blast yield: 460 kg
- Engine: Electric; silver-zinc oxide batteries or lithium ion batteries (for exercise)
- Maximum speed: 50 knots (58 mph)
- Guidance system: Wire-guided to autonomous (active and passive sonar, wake homing)
- Launch platform: submarine

DM2A4 Seehecht (export designation "SeaHake mod 4") is the latest heavyweight torpedo developed by Atlas Elektronik for the German Navy, as a further update of DM2 (Deutsches Modell 2) torpedo which was released in 1976.

== Description ==
Being the successor of the DM2A3, it features an advanced electrical propulsion system and a fiber-optic cable for torpedo guidance and communication, which, in conjunction with advanced signals processing and mission logic, makes the torpedo largely countermeasure resistant. The DM2A4/SeaHake mod 4 is the first torpedo ever to be guided by a fiber optic wire. With a fully digital system architecture, increased range and speed and its new conformal array sonar with a very wide panoramic sensor angle as well as the additional wake homing sensor, the DM2A4/SeaHake mod 4 provides greatly advanced performance over its predecessor. The homing head shell is a hydrodynamic optimised parabolic shape which aims to reduce torpedo self-noise and cavitation to an absolute minimum. The homing head's conformal transducer array permits detection angles of +/-100° in the horizontal and +/-24° in the vertical, therefore supporting larger acquisition angles in comparison to traditional flat arrays. The wide angle array is designed to reduce maneuvering when in search and reconnaissance stages, therefore also reducing self-noise and preserving battery power.

The weapon has a modular design that includes 2–4 silver-zinc oxide battery modules and is able to achieve a range of more than 50 km (27 nmi) and a speed exceeding 92.6 km/h (50 kn) powered by a high frequency permanent magnet motor, with a closed-loop cooling system independent from the environment. Exact performance data are classified. The torpedo design template may also be used as the basis for ROV. The weapon is armed with a 260 kg PBX (RDX–aluminium) warhead (equivalent to 460 kg of TNT) with magnetic influence and contact fuzes. The charge and fuse are insensitive and electromagnetic pulse safe.

The weapon has a length of 6.6 m when configured with 4 battery modules, and is respectively shorter when configured with either 3 or 2 battery modules depending upon the requirement of the operating unit. Diameter of the unit is 533 mm.

== Service history ==
The torpedo is in service with the German Navy Type 212 submarines, has been delivered to the Pakistan Navy for service in the Agosta 90B submarines, has been selected by the Spanish Navy for its new S80A submarines and has been sold to other operators worldwide.

In May 2018, Hellenic Navy released a Request For Information letter (RFI), asking various companies for acquiring 533 mm heavy torpedoes for its four Type 214 Papanikolis submarines plus one updated Type 209 AIP Okeanos. In October 2020, DM2A4 was chosen as the preferred solution, with a program consisting of 36 DM2A4, plus refurbishment of a number of older SUT Mod0 to Mod4 standard, plus extra batteries for older SST torpedoes / SUT Mod0 torpedoes, with a total cost of 105 mln euro. In September 2021, the contract was modified, with a program consisting of 44 DM2A4, without refurbishment of a number of older SUT Mod0 to Mod4 standard, plus extra batteries for older SST torpedoes / SUT Mod0 torpedoes, with a total cost of 110 mln euro. Deliveries of the new torpedoes started in 2025.

== Operators ==
The SeaHake Mod 4 torpedo is in service with eighteen countries and over 300 torpedoes (as of 2015) have been delivered:

Egypt (25)
Ordered in 2019 to equip the four new Type 209/1400mod. The DM2A4s are ordered in a small quantity, and complete the order of 125 SUT torpedoes.
Germany
Pre-series of 10 DM2A4.
Used with the Type 212A-class, entered service in 2008.
Some of the equipment of 69 DM2A4 have been modernized and tested since 2020.
Greece (82)
44 ordered in 2022 for the Okeanos-class (Type 209/1500 AIP) and the Papanikolis-class (Type 214). 38 more ordered in 2025.
Israel (130)
Used with the Dolphin class and the AIP Dolphin 2 class.
- 120 DM2A4 delivered in the period 2014-2023.
- 10 DM2A4 delivered in 2024
Pakistan (59)
Ordered in .... for the Khalid-class (Agosta 90B-class) after its mid-life update.
Spain (40)
Ordered in 2005 for the S-80-class. New batteries purchased in 2022 for the torpedoes.
Turkey (40)
40 ordered in 1999, delivered in 2004-05.
Turkey tested a torpedo in 2016 and sank the frigate TCG Zafer.
28 additional ordered in 2024.
United Arab Emirates (19)
DM2A4ER ordered in 2013, delivered in 2014.

=== Potential operator ===
India (98)
As part of the P-75I project, the Type 214-class and the S-80-class are competing for the selection. The 2DMA4 is a potential torpedo as it is qualified on the ships.

=== Failed bids ===
India (98)
As part of the P-75 project that was won by the Scorpene-class, India was looking for a torpedo. The DM2A4 was one of the competitors but no information about its purchase was released.

== See also ==
- Mk 48
- Varunastra (torpedo)
- Black Shark
- Spearfish
- Tigerfish
- Baek Sang Eo (White Shark)
- Type 89
- Type 65
- Yu-6
