= List of ship commissionings in 2006 =

The list of ship commissionings in 2006 includes a chronological list of all ships commissioned in 2006.

	Operator	Ship	Flag	Class and type	Pennant	Other notes
14 January	United States Navy	San Antonio		San Antonio-class amphibious transport dock	LPD-17	
28 January	United States Navy	Forrest Sherman		Arleigh Burke-class destroyer	DDG-98	
10 February	Royal Australian Navy	Bathurst		Armidale-class patrol boat	ACPB 85	
10 February	Royal Australian Navy	Larrakia		Armidale-class patrol boat	ACPB 84	
16 February	South African Navy	Amatola		Valour-class frigate	F145	
10 June	United States Navy	Farragut		Arleigh Burke-class destroyer	DDG-99	
15 July	Royal Australian Navy	Albany		Armidale-class patrol boat	ACPB 86	
17 July	Chilean Navy	Capitán Prat		Jacob van Heemskerck-class frigate	FFG-11	former HNLMS Witte de With
20 July	Royal Australian Navy	Pirie		Armidale-class patrol boat	ACPB 87	
20 July	South African Navy	Isandlwana		Valour-class frigate	F146	
26 August	Royal Australian Navy	Perth		Anzac-class frigate	FFH 157	
9 September	United States Navy	Texas		Virginia-class submarine	SSN-775	
16 September	Royal Australian Navy	Sirius		Fleet replenishment vessel	O 266	
22 November	Chilean Navy	Almirante Cochrane		Type 23 frigate	FF-05	former HMS Norfolk
16 December	Chilean Navy	Almirante Blanco Encalada		Karel Doorman-class frigate	FF-15	former HNLMS Abraham van der Hulst
