= Warrior-class inshore patrol vessel =

Type of South African naval vessel

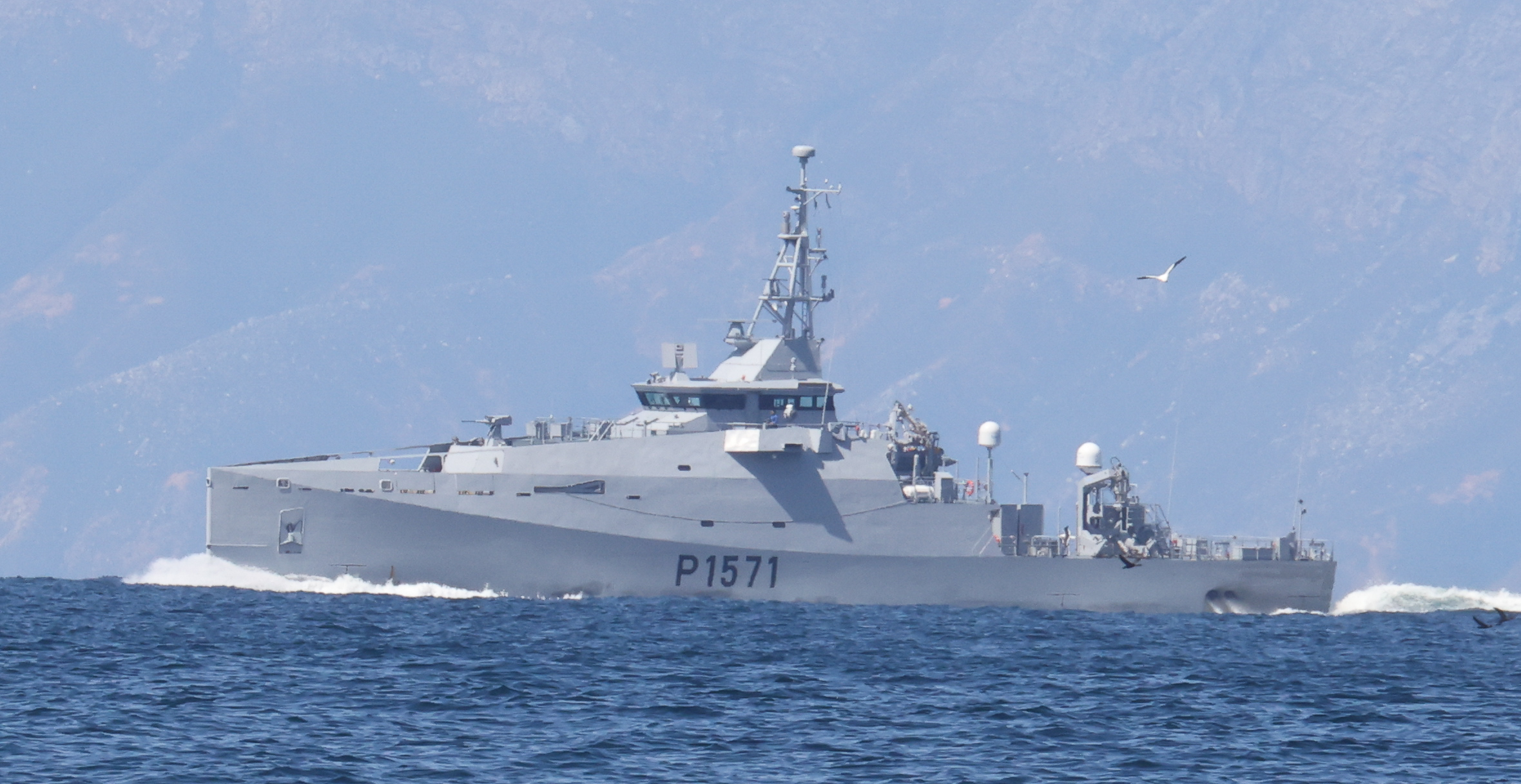
- SAS King Sekhukhune I underway off Simon's Town

Class overview
- Name: Warrior-class
- Builders: Damen Shipyards Cape Town, Damen Group
- Operators: South African Navy
- Preceded by: Warrior-class strike craft
- Cost: R3.6 billion ($228m USD) for three units (2018)
- Built: 2018-present
- In commission: 2022-present
- Planned: 15
- Building: 0
- Active: 3

General characteristics
- Type: Multi-Mission Inshore Patrol Vessel
- Displacement: 1,000 t (980 long tons)
- Length: 62 m (203 ft 5 in)
- Beam: 11.5 m (37 ft 9 in)
- Draught: 4 m (13 ft 1 in)
- Propulsion: 2 × Caterpillar 3512C HD/B diesel engines, 5,700 kW (7,600 hp); 4 × fixed-pitch propellers; 2 x stabilisers; 2 x bow thrusters
- Speed: Cruising: 20 knots (37 km/h; 23 mph) Maximum: 26.5 knots (49.1 km/h; 30.5 mph)
- Range: 4,000 nmi (7,400 km; 4,600 mi)
- Boats & landing craft carried: 1 x 7 m (23 ft 0 in) RIB 1 x 9 m (29 ft 6 in) RIB
- Troops: c.14
- Complement: 49 Officers and Crew men (capacity for 62)
- Sensors & processing systems: Reutech Radar Systems RTS 3200: a frequency-modulated continuous-wave radar/optronics tracker (FORT); Kelvin Hughes Ltd SharpEye navigation radar; X-band and S-band radars, W-AIS, Inertial Navigation System, GPS, Optical Bearing Devices and various other navigation sensors.
- Armament: 1 x 20 mm Denel Land Systems GI-2 cannon fitted in a Reutech Rogue Super Remote Weapons Station; 2 × General-purpose machine gun
- Notes: Ability to accommodate containerised mission modules. Various layouts include one 20-foot and four 10-foot containers.; Deck layout includes a knuckle boom crane, single point lifting davit rated at 5.7 tons and a single-point lifting davit rated at 2 tons.

The Warrior-class inshore patrol vessel is a class of multi-mission inshore patrol vessels (MMIPVs) built for the South African Navy, and are intended to replace the Warrior-class OPVs between 2022 and 2024. All three vessels are named after historical South African 'warriors' who had a significant impact on the development of the country.

== Development ==
Since the Strategic Defence Package of 1999, the South African Navy has envisaged replacing the ageing Warrior-class strike craft with more modern alternatives, with an aim in increasing the efficiency of policing the country's extensive maritime exclusive economic zone (1.5 million km). In 2011, it was hoped that nine Offshore Patrol Vessels (OPVs) would be constructed as a like-for-like replacement for the previous strike craft. Practical experience in the rough seas of the Cape had tended to favour the larger OPVs, as well as the vessels having the potential ability to operate helicopters from their flight deck.

In 2013 it was announced that the SA Navy had the ambition of domestically constructing three offshore, and a miniumum of six (later reduced to three) inshore patrol vessels, in what would be termed Project Biro. However, as a result of financial implications, in 2018 it was confirmed that only the three Multi-Mission Inshore Patrol Vessels (MMIPVs) would be granted funding, at a cost of R3.6 billion ($288m).

Whilst the introduction of three highly modern IPVs will play a crucial and immediate role in maritime law enforcement, it has been regretted by analysts that the OPV option was not also financially feasible due to the significant upscaling of capability available.

In March 2024 South African Navy Chief Monde Lobese explained. “The Blue Print Force design of the South African Navy requires no less than 15 of these inshore patrol vessels. The South African Navy must still realise the option of the fourth MMIPV and will attempt to source funding for the additional 11 vessels after that. There is still the urgent requirement for an additional 15 offshore patrol vessels as well.”

In February 2024, South African Defence Minister Thandi Modise also told Parliament that new offshore patrol vessels will be acquired, while the existing vessels MMIPVs will be maintained.

== Design and construction ==
The Warrior-class is based upon the highly successful Damen Stan Patrol 6211 and is designed with the patented Sea Axe Hull - the first to operate in South Africa. The straight-edged bow will improve safety and comfort when operating in the rough seas found off South Africa, as well as significantly reducing fuel consumption and emissions. The design of the vessel ensures low sea resistance, high sustained speed in waves and superior sea keeping characteristics. Vertical accelerations are reduced significantly, and bow slamming is almost eliminated, thus notably increasing the safety of the vessel and of the crew.

The 62m by 11m vessels, weighing 750 tons, have a range of 2000 nm when at an economical 20 knots. The vessels are powered by four Caterpillar 3512C HD/B engines, delivering 5 700 kW (7 644) hp and driving four fixed pitch propellers. They will also each have two stabilisers and two bow thrusters. The class has a maximum speed of 26.5 knots and a maximum range of 4000 nm.

Equipped with radar, combat management systems, a forward gun position and various heavy machine guns equipped to the vessel, the class also carry two RHIBs for boarding operations, with the aft deck being designed to accommodate various container arrangements that aid unique mission requirements. Deck layout includes a knuckle boom crane, single point lifting davit rated at 5.7 tons and a single point lifting davit rated at 2 tons. The vessels can accommodate up to 14 non-crew, primarily for boarding or landing parties, and will work closely with the Maritime Reaction Squadron in the law-enforcemant role.

In 2018, Damen Shipyards Cape Town (DSCT) secured the order from Armscor for the delivery of three inshore patrol vessels, with an open-ended option for a possible fourth, beating competition from Durban based Southern African Shipyards (SAS) and a Nautic Africa/Austal partnership. In February 2019, DSCT ceremonially laid the keel for the first MMIPV, SAS King Sekhukhune I, and formally delivered the vessel to the SA Navy three years later in May 2022. Delivery dates for the final two vessels are scheduled for June 2023 and September 2024, with the timetable slipping slightly due to COVID-19.

DSCT has exceeded Project Biro's 60% local content requirements by issuing contracts to a large number of local suppliers and as a result of their work on Project Biro, many of these suppliers are now earmarked for work on Damen projects in and outside of South Africa.

The project has created over 300 direct jobs by DSCT, and also supports another 1000 indirect jobs. DSCT states that the project has played an important role in creating skilled employment in South Africa, and has acted as a catalyst for the development of regional supply chains.

== Capabilities and Features ==
The Warrior-class IPVs are multi-role designed and will be employed in a wide range of missions, such as mine counter-measures, deep diving training, search and rescue, submarine torpedo recovery, humanitarian assistance and anti-pollution tasks - particularly key constabulary roles such as intercepting illegal trafficking, fishing and counter-piracy.

The MMIPVs' main armament is the Reutech 20 mm Super Rogue remotely controlled gun, with heavy machine guns mounted on the bridge wings. Their primary sensor is the Reutech Radar Systems RTS 3200: a frequency-modulated continuous-wave radar/optronics tracker (FORT) that was previously trialled aboard the frigate SAS Spioenkop. Reutech is also providing the communications system, which will be LINK-ZA compatible, alongside other Communication Intercept and passive Close-In Surveillance systems.

Their ability to accommodate at short notice containerised mission modules gives them a true multi-mission capability. Container fittings on the aft deck will be available for fastening on mission equipment. Various layouts are accommodated, including one 20 foot and four 10 foot containers.

The vessels will carry one 7m and one 9m rigid-hull inflatable boat for boarding operations.

== Operational Deployment ==
SAS King Sekhukhune I was commissioned into service and formally christened at a service at Salisbury Island, Durban Harbour in June 2022. Delivered to the Navy in May 2022 by DSCT, King Sekhukhune I spent the following month working up before moving to Naval Base Durban, the home of the newly formed patrol squadron.

SAS King Sekhukhune I and SAS Adam Kok III took part in the ninth edition of IBSAMAR led by the Indian Navy with the Brazilian Navy in the Simon’s Town and False Bay areas of South Africa from 8 to 21 October 2026.

== Ships in Class ==
Name	Pennant	Commissioned	Notes
SAS King Sekhukhune I	P1571	15 June 2022	
SAS King Shaka Zulu	P1572	24 April 2025	Delivered 27 October 2023.
SAS Adam Kok	P1573	15 October 2025	Delivered March 2024.
