= 122 Squadron =

122 Squadron or 122nd Squadron may refer to:

- 122 Squadron (Israel)
- 122 Squadron, Republic of Singapore Air Force, see list of Republic of Singapore Air Force squadrons
- 112 Squadron, Ala 12, Spanish Air Force
- 122 Squadron SAAF, South Africa
- No. 122 Squadron RAF, United Kingdom
- 122nd Fighter Squadron, United States Air Force
- 122nd Observation Squadron, United States Air Force
- VA-122 (U.S. Navy)
- VFA-122, United States Navy
- VMFA-122, United States Marine Corps
- 122nd Fighter Aviation Squadron, Yugoslavia
- 122nd Hydroplane Liaison Squadron, Yugoslavia
