= IBSAMAR =

Series of Indian/Brazilian/South African naval exercises

IBSAMAR are a series of naval exercises between the navies of India, Brazil and South Africa. The name IBSAMAR is an abbreviation of India-Brazil-South Africa Maritime.

Edition	Dates	Participants	Location	References
I	2 - 16 May 2008		South Africa	
II	10 - 26 September 2010	INS Mysore; INS Tabar; INS Ganga; INS Aditya; Niteroi-class frigate; SAS Amatola; SAS Spioenkop; SAS Galeshewe; SAS Queen Modjadji I; SAS Drakensberg	South Africa	
III	10 - 26 October 2012	INS Delhi; INS Deepak; BNS Barroso; SAS Amatola; SAS Umzimkulu; SAS Queen Modjadji I	South Africa	
IV	20 October - 7 November 2014		Naval Base Simon's Town, South Africa	
V	19 - 29 February 2016	INS Mumbai; INS Trishul; INS Shalki; BNS Amazonas; SAS Spioenkop	Goa, India	
VI	1 - 13 October 2018	INS Tarkash; INS Kolkata; BNS Barroso; SAS Amatola; SAS Protea; SAS Manthatisi	Simon's Town, South Africa	
VII	10 - 12 October 2022	INS Tarkash	Gqeberha, South Africa	
VIII	6 - 20 October 2024	INS Talwar; BNS Defensora	Simon's Town, South Africa	
IX	8–21 October 2026	INS Tarkash (with integral Chetak helicopter); SAS Amatola (F145); 2 Warrior-class inshore patrol vessel (SAS King Sekhukhune I, SAS Adam Kok III); SAS Manthatisi (S101); Gripen fighter support (SAAF); BNS Barroso (V34) (with integral Lynx helicopter)	Harbour phase (8–14 October): Simon’s Town, South Africa Sea phase (15–21 October): False Bay, South Africa	

== See also ==
- IBSA Dialogue Forum
