= SAHV-3 surface-to-air missile =

SAHV-3
- Type: Surface To Air
- Place of origin: South Africa

Service history
- Used by: South Africa

Production history
- Designed: Between the 1980's and 1991
- Manufacturer: Kentron/Denel Dynamics
- Developed into: Umkhonto (missile)
- Produced: Limited testing 1993‍–‍1994
- Variants: SAHV-IR, SAHV-RS, SAHV-3

Specifications
- Mass: 123kg
- Length: 3.08m
- Diameter: 180mm
- Wingspan: 404mm
- Effective firing range: 12km
- Maximum firing range: 15km
- Warhead: High-Explosive-Fragmentation, HE-FRAG
- Warhead weight: 22kg
- Detonation mechanism: Proximity Fuse: 10m RF with 95% kill probability
- Propellant: Single-stage solid fuel smokeless propellant
- Flight altitude: Max altitude: well over 30000ft Max effective altitude: 8km
- Maximum speed: Mach 3.5, Mach 1.5 at 12000m
- Guidance system: IR, RS, LOSBR Laser, RF
- Steering system: 4 rear fins with a maneuverability of 40gs single-plane and 6gs single-lane at 20000ft height

The SAHV-3 was a South African surface-to-air missile built in the 1980s for the South African Border War but was canceled when the war ended. It was developed into the Umkhonto SAM system.

== Variants ==
The SAHV-3 had 3 Variants.

The SAHV-IR

The SAHV-IR was an IR variant of the SAHV missile that used a DL+IOG+Flare resistant dual channel IR seeker, it was a Fox-2 missile.

The SAHV-3

The SAHV-3 was the main SAHV missile which used a LOSBR Laser or RF guidance System, it was a Fox-1 missile.

The SAHV-RS

The SAHV-RS was a more advanced missile in the sense that it used a DL+IOG+ARH guidance system meaning it could act as a Fox-3 missile.

== Planned Uses ==
The SAHV missiles were planned to be used on these systems.

=== ZA-HVM ===
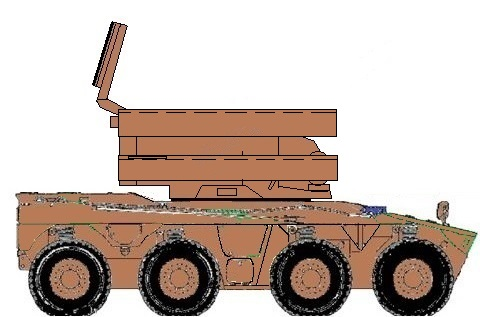

The ZA-HVM was a planned missile system built off the Rooikat chassis, and although there is documented evidence of it, there is no photographic evidence on if it got past Wooden Mockup stage, it could use 8 Missile pods on the turret at once as well as the G6-HVM and it had all the same features but with a different turret and Chassis.

=== Vehicle Specifications ===
==== ZA-HVM and G6-HVM ====
Search Radar: EDR110

- Radar Type: Planar array PESA Radar
- Band Type: IEEE: L NATO: D
- Range: 25 kilometres (16 mi) with a 7.5 kilometres (4.7 mi) Ceiling
- Scan Zone: 360°x50°(-5°+45°)
- Scan Rate: 60 rpm
- IFF: Yes
- TWS Tracking: Up to 100 targets at once
- Tracker / Tracking Radar: ETS 2400
- Type: Combined IR/RF Tracker
- IRST Lock Range: 10 kilometres (6.2 mi)
- Radar Lock Range: 20 kilometres (12 mi)
- Radar Band: IEEE: Ka NATO: K
