= SAS Amatola =

2002 Valour-class frigate

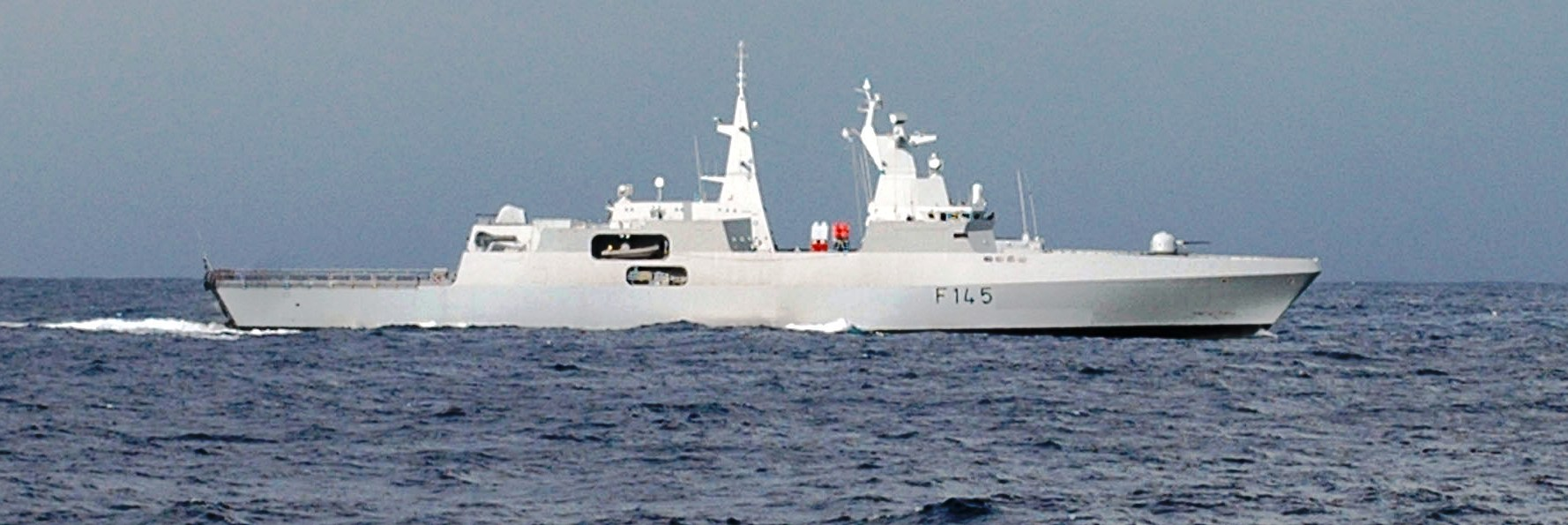
- SAS Amatola (F145) in 2009

History

South Africa
- Name: SAS Amatola
- Namesake: The Amatola Mountains where British forces fought the Xhosas in late 1852
- Operator: South African Navy
- Ordered: 3 December 1999
- Builder: Blohm+Voss, Hamburg
- Laid down: 6 August 2001
- Launched: 6 June 2002
- Commissioned: 16 February 2006
- Home port: Simonstown
- Identification: MMSI number: 601350000; Callsign: ZSRH
- Status: in active service

General characteristics
- Class & type: Valour-class frigate
- Displacement: 3,700 long tons (3,759 t)
- Length: 121 m (397 ft 0 in)
- Beam: 16.34 m (53 ft 7 in)
- Draught: 5.95 m (19 ft 6 in)
- Propulsion: CODAG WARP; 2 × Diesels 5,920 kW (7,939 hp) each; 2 shafts; 1 × Gas turbine 20,000 kW (26,820 hp); 1 waterjet
- Speed: 30 knots (56 km/h; 35 mph)
- Range: 8,000 nmi (15,000 km) at 16 knots (30 km/h; 18 mph)
- Complement: 152
- Sensors & processing systems: Surveillance Radar: Thales Naval France MRR-3D NG G-band multi-role radar; Optical Radar Tracker: 2 Reutech RTS 6400 monopulse X-band (I/J bands) combined radar and optronics trackers; Electro-optical Tracker: Reutech Electro-optical tracker; Identification Friend or Foe: Tellumat Integrated Naval IFF system; Target Designation Sights: M-Tek Target Designation Sights; Sonar: Thales UMS4132 Kingklip sonar; Obstacle avoidance sonar: MDS 3060
- Electronic warfare & decoys: ESM/ECM: Saab Grintek Avitronics SME 100/200 ESM (Intercept and Jammer) & ELINT; Decoys: 2 Saab Grintek Avitronics MRL Super Barricade chaff launchers (96 decoys)
- Armament: 1 × Otobreda 76 mm gun; 1 × twin barreled 35 mm (Denel) dual purpose gun; 2 × Oerlikon 20 mm cannon Mk1; 8 × MBDA MM40 Exocet Block 2 SSM (2 × 4-cell launchers); 32 × Umkhonto SAM (4 × 8-cell vertical launchers); 4×324mm torpedo tubes
- Aircraft carried: 1 × SuperLynx 300 (can carry 2)
- Aviation facilities: Flight deck; Enclosed hangar

SAS Amatola (F145) is the first of four Valour-class frigates for the South African Navy by the European South African Corvette Consortium.

Amatola, in keeping with a naming convention depicting acts of valour, was named after the Amatola mountain range in the Eastern Cape area where British forces fought the Xhosa nation in late 1852. Mrs Zanele Mbeki (wife of then President Thabo Mbeki), named the vessel at the Blohm & Voss Thyssen Rheinstahl, Howaldtswerke Deutsche Werft (HDW) and Thales shipyards in Germany just after noon on 7 June 2002.

== Construction ==
The vessels of the class were manufactured by the European South African Corvette Consortium (ESACC), consisting of the German Frigate Consortium (Blohm+Voss, Thyssen Rheinstahl and Howaldtswerke Deutsche Werft), African Defence Systems (part of the French Thales defence group) and a number of South African companies.

The ships were built to the MEKO modular design concept, and are designated by the manufacturer as the MEKO A-200SAN class. Some controversy exists as to the class type of the vessel, with both the manufacturer and the South African Navy referring to her as a "corvette", but other similar vessels in other navies being referred to as frigates. Some have claimed that the use of the word "corvette" was a political decision made by the South African government to ease criticism of the procurement of the vessels.

SAS Amatola was built at the Blohm + Voss shipyards in Hamburg, Germany, and she arrived in South Africa on 4 June 2003. She was next fitted out with her various weapons and electronic systems, and weapons integration trials were begun in October 2004. This was followed by the warship's commissioning on 16 February 2006.

On 7 April 2006 Amatola arrived from Kiel after accompanying the submarine Manthatisi to Simon's Town on her maiden voyage.

== Status ==
According to a presentation made to the Joint Standing Committee on Defence by Rear Admiral B.K. Mhlana, Deputy Chief of the Navy in May 2023, Amatola had been scheduled for a refit since 2018 but no work had been done to date. Her mid-life update, originally scheduled for 2024, had been postponed to 2027. The admiral described the ship as effectively non-operational until a refit could be completed.

In 2024 it had been planned to embark the ship on a long voyage, including participation in the Russian Navy's "Navy Day" in St. Petersburg. However, the deployment had to be cancelled due to "current defects to the vessel".

== Notable Deployments ==
During 2007, this vessel became the first South African frigate in decades to take part in the Royal Navy's Basic Operational Sea Training (BOST) programme, however without any embarked Super Lynx 300 helicopters, since these had not been delivered by the Westland company at the time.

Deployment	
Exercise GOOD HOPE 2 2006	SAS Amatola participated in the combined Exercise Good Hope 2 with the German Navy and the German and South African air forces off the Cape Peninsula in 2006
Escort to S101 Submarine 2006	SAS Amatola escorted the first of the three new Class 209 submarines to SA
Exercise INTEROP WEST 2006	Deployment to Nigeria, Cameroon, Gabon, Soa Tome Islands.
Exercise BOST 2007	Completion of British Operational Sea Training (BOST) programme, in the UK, with Royal Navy.
NATO Exercise AMAZOLO 2007	Exercise Amazolo, the first multi-navy exercise to involve ships of the North Atlantic Treaty Organisation (NATO) and the South African Navy took place in September 2007. The NATO ships included the USS Normandy, FGS Spessart, HNLMS Evertsen, HMCS Toronto, HDMS Olfert Fischer and NRP Álvares Cabral.
Exercise GOOD HOPE III 2008	Task Group 501.01, composed of South African and German Naval vessels, included the frigates FGS Hamburg (F220) and FGS Köln (F211), combat support ship FGS Berlin (A1411) and the supply vessel FGS Westerwald (A1435) plus a large number of SA ships and aircraft, including Amatola. Exercise Good Hope III is a multinational exercise between the German Armed Forces (Navy and Air Force) and the SANDF (mainly the Navy and Air Force) taking place in the Cape Town, Simon's Town and Overberg area.
Exercise IBSAMAR I 2008	Exercise ISBSAMAR was an exercise between the navies of India, Brazil and South Africa (The IBSA countries)
Exercise Atlasur VII 2008	Exercise ATLASUR is a biannual, joint and combined maritime exercise between the Navies of South Africa, Brazil, Argentina and Uruguay
Exercise Good Hope IV February 2010	Bilateral naval exercise between South Africa and Germany.
Exercise Good Hope V March 2012	Bilateral naval exercise between South Africa and Germany.
Exercise Atlasur IX between 24 September to 10 October 2012	Multinational maritime exercise between the navies of South Africa, Argentina, Brazil and Uruguay.
Exercise Ibsamar III between 10 and 26 October 2012	Trilateral naval exercise between Brazil, India and South Africa along with.
Operation Copper After 2011	Anti-piracy deployment in the Mozambique Channel. All four Valour-class frigates, SAS Drakensberg, and two of the SAN's offshore patrol vessels (OPVs) have intermittently spent time on station since the operation began.
International Fleet Review 2026	Held at Visakapatanam in India.
Exercise MILAN 2026	Held at Visakapatanam in India.
IBSAMAR 2026	Took part in the ninth edition of IBSAMAR led by the Indian Navy with the Brazilian Navy in the Simon’s Town and False Bay areas of South Africa from 8 to 21 October 2026.
