= SAS Manthatisi =

Heroine-class submarine

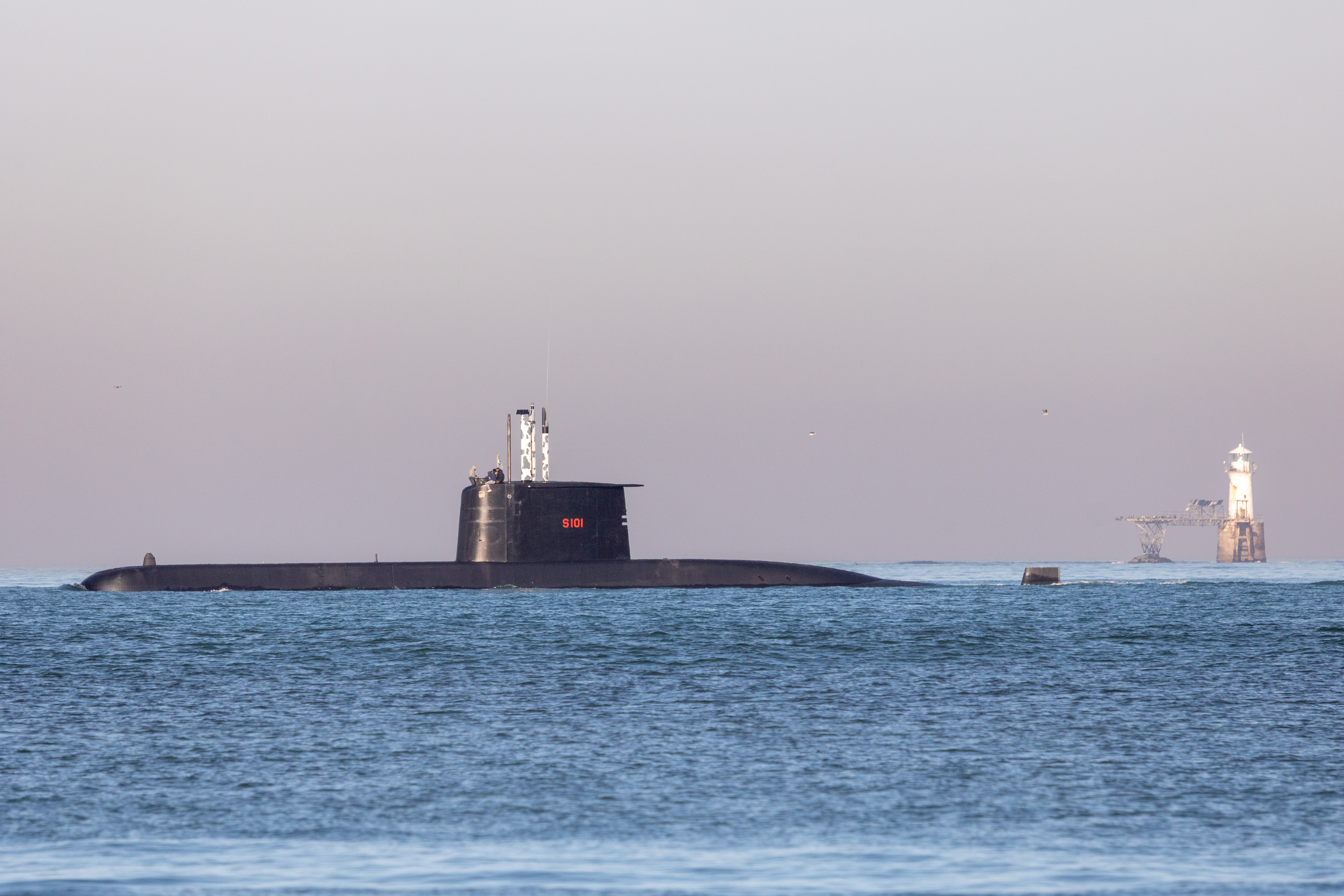
- SAS Manthatisi in June 2023

History

South Africa
- Name: SAS Manthatisi
- Namesake: An 18th Century Batlokwa chieftainess
- Operator: South African Navy
- Builder: Howaldtswerke-Deutsche Werft, Kiel
- Launched: 15 June 2004
- Commissioned: 3 November 2005
- Home port: Simon's Town
- Status: in active service

General characteristics
- Type: Heroine-class submarine
- Displacement: 1,454 t, submerged
- Length: 62 m
- Beam: 7.6 m
- Draft: 5.8 m
- Propulsion: Diesel-electric, 4 diesels, 1 shaft, 6100 shp
- Speed: 10 knots (19 km/h), surfaced; 21.5 knots (40 km/h), submerged
- Range: 11,000 nmi. at 10 knots, surfaced, (20,000 km at 20 km/h); 8,000 nmi. at 10 knots, snorkeling, (15,000 km at 20 km/h); 400 nmi. at 4 knots, submerged; (740 km at 7 km/h)
- Test depth: 500 m
- Complement: 30
- Sensors & processing systems: Sonar: STN Atlas CSU-90; hull mounted and flank arrays; Radar: Surface search I-band; Optics: Zeiss non-hull penetrating optronic mast
- Electronic warfare & decoys: ESM: Grintek Avitronics, intercept + radar warning receiver; ELINT: Saab S/UME-100 tactical electronic support measures
- Armament: 8 × 21-inch (533 mm) torpedo tubes, 14 AEG SUT 264 torpedoes; optional UGM-84 Harpoon integration

SAS Manthatisi (S101) is a Heroine-class submarine currently in service with the South African Navy. SAS Manthatisi is named after the female warrior chief of the Batlokwa tribe. The Executive Mayor of Naledi Local Municipality and the godmother of the S101, Dr. Ruth Segomotso Mompati, announced the name of the submarine in 2006 at a ceremony in Simon's Town.

== Background ==
South Africa placed a contract for three Type 209/1400 submarines in July 2000 on Howaldtswerke-Deutsche Werft (HDW) and Thyssen Nordseewerke. The Type 209/1400 submarines replace the French-built Daphné-class submarines, SAS Spear, SAS Assegaai and SAS Umkhonto which were decommissioned in 2003. The Heroine class are sometimes considered to be South Africa's first "true" submarines, as they were more suited to being underwater than the Daphné models.

Manthatisi arrived in Simon's Town on 8 April 2006, accompanied by the Valour-class frigate SAS Amatola (F145).

== Operational history ==
Exercise Amazolo, the first multi-navy exercise to involve ships of the North Atlantic Treaty Organisation (NATO) and the South African Navy took place in September 2007. The NATO ships included the USS Normandy, German tanker Spessart, HNLMS Evertsen, HMCS Toronto, HDMS Olfert Fischer and NRP Álvares Cabral. The Manthatisi managed to penetrate an anti-submarine screen of seven ships, including the two South African Valour-class frigates SAS Amatola (F145) and SAS Isandlwana (F146) and the USS Normandy. After having 'sunk' the target being protected by the surface screen, the submarine turned on the surface warships and 'sank' each of them as well.

Manthatisi was withdrawn from service in 2007 and placed in reserve as part of the SAN's plan to maintain only two out of its three submarines in service. She began a refit in 2010, and re-entered service in October 2014. As of April 2023, Manthatisi had completed a Docking and Essential Defect (DED) maintenance period and was undergoing post-maintenance trials. However, according to a presentation made to the Joint Standing Committee on Defence by Rear Admiral B.K. Mhlana, Deputy Chief of the Navy in May 2023, the mid-life update for the submarine, that was due to start in 2022, had not yet commenced.

On 20 September 2023, Manthatisi was involved in a fatal accident en route to Table Bay from Simon's Town for the South African Navy Festival. All seven swept off board were recovered by the NSRI near Slangkop Lighthouse with 3 fatalities.

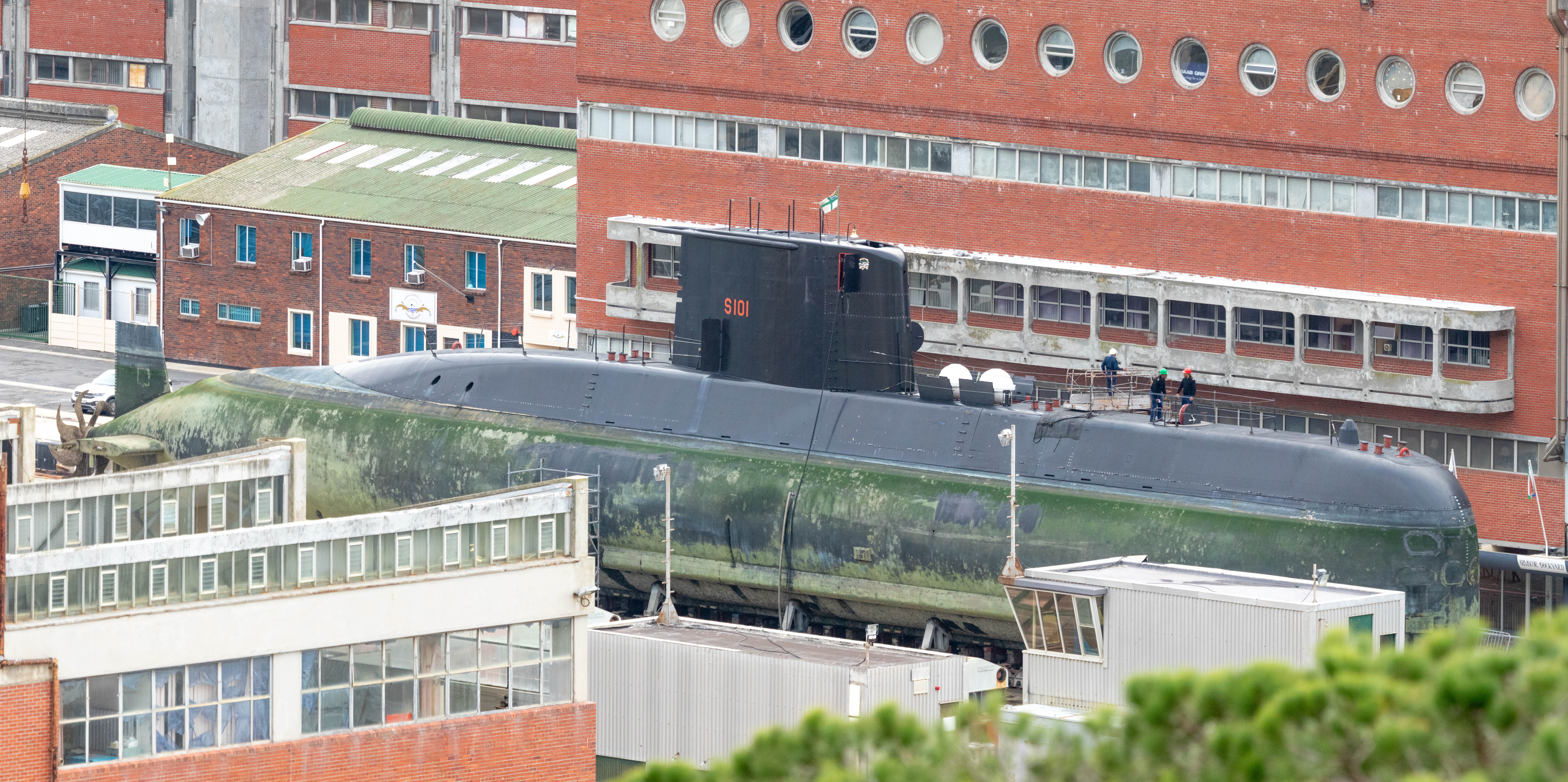
SAS Manthatisi undergoing maintenance In June 2025.

In August 2025, the Indian Navy undertook the Rescue Seat Certification of SAS Manthatisi. This follows the "rescue cooperation pact" signed between Indian Navy Chief Admiral Dinesh K Tripathi and South African Navy Chief Vice Admiral Monde Lobese on 3 September 2024 which allows India to deploy its Deep Submergence Rescue Vessel (DSRV) for assistance in case a South African Navy Submarine experiences an emergency. An Indian Navy team visited Simon's Town and held talks with multiple talks South African stakeholders before the certification.

Manthatisi took part in the ninth edition of IBSAMAR led by the Indian Navy with the Brazilian Navy in the Simon’s Town and False Bay areas of South Africa from 8 to 21 October 2026.
