= Valour-class frigate =

South African navy frigates

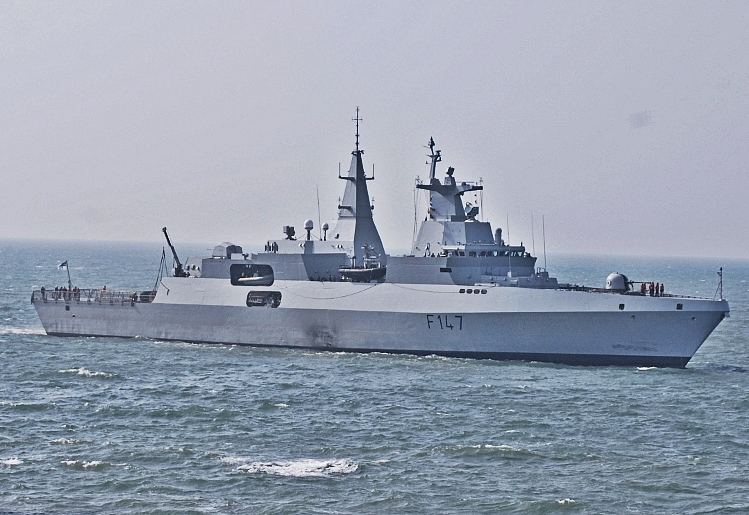
- SAS Spioenkop during Exercise IBSAMAR

Class overview
- Name: Valour-class
- Builders: Howaldtswerke-Deutsche Werft, Kiel and Blohm+Voss, Hamburg
- Operators: South African Navy
- Preceded by: President class
- Cost: R9.65 billion (2007) for 4 units; R2.41 billion (2007) per unit
- Built: 2001–2002
- In commission: 2006–present
- Planned: 5
- Completed: 4
- Canceled: 1
- Active: 4

General characteristics
- Type: Guided-missile frigate
- Displacement: 3,700 tons
- Length: 107.3 m (352 ft 0 in) at waterline; 121 m (397 ft 0 in) overall
- Beam: 16.34 m (53 ft 7 in)
- Draught: 5.95 m (19 ft 6 in)
- Propulsion: CODAG WARP; 2 MTU 16V 1163 TB93 diesel engines, 5,920 kilowatts (7,940 hp) each, 2 shafts for cruise; 1 General Electric LM2500, 20,000 kilowatts (27,000 hp); 1 waterjet
- Speed: 30 knots (56 km/h; 35 mph)
- Range: 8,000 nmi (15,000 km; 9,200 mi) at 16 knots (30 km/h; 18 mph)
- Endurance: 28 days
- Complement: 152 (incl aircrew)
- Sensors & processing systems: Combat management systems: Thales TAVITAC; Surveillance radar: Thales Naval France MRR-3D NG G-band multi-role radar; Optical radar tracker: 2 Reutech RTS 6400 monopulse X band (I/J bands) combined radar and optronics trackers; Electro-optical tracker: Reutech Electro-optical tracker; Identification friend or foe: Tellumat Integrated Naval Identification friend or foe system; Target designation sights: M-Tek Target Designation Sights; Sonar: Thales UMS4132 Kingklip sonar; Obstacle avoidance sonar: MDS 3060
- Electronic warfare & decoys: ESM/ECM: Saab Grintek Avitronics SME 100/200 ESM (Intercept and Jammer) & ELINT; Decoys: 2 Saab Grintek Avitronics MRL Super Barricade chaff launchers (96 decoys)
- Armament: Anti-ship missiles: 8 MBDA MM 40 Exocet Block 2 surface-to-surface missiles (mounted in two four-cell launchers); Surface-to-air: 16 Umkhonto surface-to-air missiles in a 32-cell Vertical launching system, can be increased to 32 missiles; Naval guns: 1 Otobreda 76 mm gun; 1 Denel 35mm Dual Purpose Gun (CIWS); 2 Mk1 Oerlikon 20 mm cannon; 2 12.7 mm Rogue remotely operated guns; ASW: 4 324 mm (12.8 in) torpedo tubes
- Armour: Welded GL-D36 steel
- Aircraft carried: 2 SuperLynx 300, 1 Atlas Oryx, 2 AgustaWestland AW109, 1 Denel Rooivalk or various UAVs (Planned)
- Aviation facilities: Flight deck; Enclosed hangar

The Valour class is a class of frigates built for the South African Navy. Part of the MEKO family of warships, the German shipbuilder Blohm+Voss officially designate the class as the MEKO A-200SAN.

Designed as a multiple purpose, multi capable frigate, the Valour class encompasses the general guided-missile anti-surface and anti-air role forming the core of the South African surface fleet. The Valour class frigates employ the use of stealth technology to avoid enemy radar and infra-red detection.

Four Valour class frigates were constructed for the South African Navy as part of the Strategic Defence Package 1999. The first, SAS Amatola, was commissioned in 2006, with the fourth and final, SAS Mendi, commissioned in March 2007. The frigates have a service life of 30–40 years. However, in May 2023, Rear Admiral B.K. Mhlana, Deputy Chief of the Navy, reported to the Joint Standing Committee on Defence that Mendi was the only frigate of her class still effectively operational, given cancellations and delays in refits for her sister ships. In 2024, a planned voyage by SAS Amatola to participate in the Russian Navy's "Navy Day" in St. Petersburg had to be cancelled due to “current defects to the vessel”.

The Valour-class vessels are named in honor of acts of distinguished bravery in South African military history.

== Development ==
The concept for the Valour class (Project Sitron) was first conceived in the late 1990s as part of the Strategic Defence Package, in which the new South African ANC government was keen to modernise the armed forces after decades of apartheid-era United Nations sanctions. Since the 1970s, previous attempts to replace the aging Type-12 (President class) frigates, as well as the 'W' (Jan van Riebeeck) class destroyers, had repeatedly been aborted due to sanctions, strategic considerations and financial cost. The Portuguese Carnation Revolution of 1974 axed efforts to acquire four João Coutinho-class corvettes (Project Taurus), and the delivery of three Type-69A light corvettes and two Agosta-class submarines from France was cancelled at the last minute after the imposition of mandatory UN sanctions in 1977. Following from the successful experience of constructing SAS Drakensberg in 1987, it was briefly considered that a class of frigates could be locally constructed at the same shipyard. However, an increasingly deteriorating security and financial situation by the late 1980s within South Africa put an end to the project. As the final Type-12 frigate was retired without replacement in 1985, the intensifying Border War forced the navy to shift operational focus away from the regional capabilities of large surface units to a purely localised coastal force, with a new core of offshore patrol vessels and mine hunters. As white minority rule came to a negotiated end by 1994, the Navy had lost all its major surface warships and suffered from a critical lack of anti-submarine and anti-air capability, operating nine increasingly obsolete strike craft OPVs and three aged diesel electric submarines.

The Spanish frigate design, the Álvaro de Bazán class topped an acquisition effort in 1995 under Project Falcon, however this was later cancelled in favour of the wider Strategic Defence Package.

In 1999, an initial tender of five general purpose warships that could negotiate the tough sea conditions off the South African coast was met with four designs being proposed by the United Kingdom (GEC F3000), Germany (MEKO A200), France (La Fayette) and Spain (Bazan 59B). The ANC Government was keen that the newly democratic South Africa would play a leading role in African peacekeeping missions, and as such required a naval force that had regional capability. The winning design had to be able to conduct sustained operations at sea - potentially far from a home port, provide gunfire and transport support to land forces, have helicopter capacity, and undertake a range of general offensive and defensive missions, as well as regular maritime patrols on behalf of law enforcement.

On 3 December 1999, a contract was signed with the European South African Corvette Consortium (ESACC) to provide four warships based on the German MEKO 200 design bid. ESACC consisted of Blohm+Voss, Thyssen Rheinstahl and Howaldtswerke Deutsche Werft, African Defence Systems (part of the French Thales defence group) and a number of South African companies. Originally termed corvettes for political reasons by the South African Navy, the Valour class design, officially the MEKO A200SAN, represented a quantum leap in multi-purpose capability, with a final procurement cost of R9.65 billion in 2007.

=== Construction ===
Construction began on the Valour class when the first steel was cut on 6 August 2001 for SAS Amatola at the Blohm+Voss shipyards in Hamburg, Germany. SAS Spioenkop was also assembled here. SAS Isandlwana and SAS Mendi were constructed separately at the Howaldtswerke Deutsche Werft shipyards in Kiel. All four frigates were first laid down between August 2001 and June 2002, launched by October 2003 and later delivered to South Africa by the end of 2004. The delivery programme was delayed by up to nine months after the discovery of defects in installed electrical cabling in the lead ship SAS Amatola. Further delays were not incurred to the programme as the electrical cabling at fault had not yet been fitted to the subsequent frigates. The majority of the combat suite, weapons and sensors were designed and built by South African companies, with the integration process taking between 2–3 years per ship in South Africa. Final commissioning into service was achieved by 2007 for all four vessels.

== Characteristics and design ==
The A200SAN design is an evolution of the MEKO 200 series of frigates that have been built for the Greek, Turkish, Australian and New Zealand navies since the late 1980s. Experience has been gained by Blohm+Voss when optimising weight distribution, trim, low noise and manoeuvrability. Focusing on providing a frigate for navies with a restricted budget, the design ensures a low crew complement, comfortable accommodation, and plenty of space for future technological upgrades on a modular construction.

The A200SAN design offers very solid sea-keeping due to high forward buoyancy and stability reserves to accommodate future upgrades, making the class perfect when engaging in sustained operations in the rough sea conditions found off the South African coast. The Valour class has a strong focus on conflict survivability and was built around the latest principles of stealth design in naval construction. The design has the extensive use of the ‘X-form’ structure in which right angles and vertical surfaces are avoided, whilst techniques to reduce an infrared signature allow for pre-cooled exhaust gasses to be expelled just above the waterline. A degree of proactive protection has also been incorporated into the design, along with an optimised layout and damage control features with light ceramic and Kevlar armour shielding critical compartments and the dividing up of the hull into zones with independent fire fighting, electrical and HVAC systems. More than 10 watertight compartments, as well as double bulkheads and box girders running lengthwise, form the steel hull which has been proven to prevent break-up. Blohm+Voss claim that the Valour class has a radar signature 50% smaller than a comparable vessel of their size, 75% less infrared emissions than previous designs, as well as 20% lower life-cycle cost, 25% lower displacement and 30% fewer crew required.

The Valour class has been designed with growth in mind, based around future technology and flexible mission requirements. The design allows for a flexible mission bay with space for two ISO containers, a recessed boat bay on either side of the ship, and wide passageways to aid maintenance, upgrades and store replenishment. Even after the fitting out of weapons systems and sensors, the A200SAN allows for a 200-tonne margin of future growth, 20% spare electrical generation, and 37% spare cooling capacity.

The propulsion system of the class is unique amongst other warships. Using a CODAG-WARP arrangement (Combined Diesel and Gas turbine - Waterjet and Refined Propellers), the design utilises two controllable pitch propellers and single water jet. In diesel-only mode the arrangement is very fuel-efficient as a single engine can drive both shafts for speeds of up to 18 knots (33 km/h; 21 mph). An independent centre-line gas turbine drives the water jet, coupled by a small reduction gear, eliminating the need for another combining gearbox. The water jet can be used alone, or combined with the diesel engines to achieve the maximum speed of nearly 30 knots (56 km/h; 35 mph). A reverse-thrust bucket is also fitted that can be raised to redirect the water jet forward, giving the class the shortest stopping distance of any other similar warship.

- I – Economical mode: One diesel engine driving both shafts, maximum propeller speed: 150 rpm and up to 18 knots.
- II – Maneuvering mode: Both diesel engines driving both shafts, maximum propeller speed: 200 rpm.
- III – CODAG-WARP: Both diesel engines and the gas turbines engaged, maximum propeller speed: 215 rpm and a maximum speed of over 27 knots (50 km/h; 31 mph).
- IV – Gas turbine only: Gas turbines powering water jet only.

These frigates are expected to spend about 80% of their at-sea time in modes I and II, allowing for a maximum range of 7,500 nautical miles (13,900 km; 8,600 mi) at 16 knots (30 km/h; 18 mph). The A200SAN is also conspicuous for the lack of any funnel or uptakes in the centre of the ship, resulting in more space for above deck weapons and accommodation. The ships are exceptionally quiet and vibration-free as a result, and add further to their already high level of stealth characteristics.

The ship's steering gear consists of a steering unit and twin semi-balanced underhung rudders. There is an emergency steering station in the superstructure in the event of damage to the bridge and they can also be operated by hand from the steering gear compartment. To improve the ship's performance in a seaway, they are fitted with a B+V Simplex Compact stabiliser system.

This class of warship has seven independent Noske Kaeser air-conditioning plants allowing the ship to operate at a pre-set temperature and moisture level in ocean water ranging between 4 and 30 °C (39 and 86 °F), and the air temperature between −4 and 32 °C (25 and 90 °F). This also keeps the air pressure in the citadel five millibars higher than on the outside to prevent the drawing in of RBC (radioactive, biological, or chemical) contamination. These ships are also fitted with Sulzer und Weise seawater fire-fighting pumps and sprinkler systems. These are also ready to wet down the warship's ammunition magazines. In addition, a CO_{2} fire-extinguishing system protects the gas turbine and diesel engineering areas. The galleys are fitted with an ANSUL system and the flight deck and hangar with a Noske Kaeser Hy FEx foam fire extinguishing system. Two Pall Rochem reverse-osmosis plants generate 15 cubic metres (530 cu ft) of fresh water each every 24 hours. This water is provided to the galleys, messes, and drinking water supplies, and it is also used for cooling the guns, the air-conditioners, and the engine room, in addition for washing the helicopters. Water pumped to the guns, sensors, and air-conditioners is chilled by two Noske Kaeser refrigerators. An oil-fired hot-water boiler, made by the same company, provides the ship's heating, whereas the hot water for the galley and messes comes from a 600-litre (130 imp gal; 160 US gal), 45-kilowatt electric geyser. With a main crew of 92, plus eight aircrew, stores can last for up to 28 days when on station.

== Weapons, countermeasures, capabilities and sensors ==
The four Valour-class frigates are armed with surface-to-air and anti-ship missiles, a range of multi-purpose weaponry, and can operate helicopters that significantly improve and extend operational ability. The class have been hailed as the most powerful surface units in sub-Saharan Africa, and have restored South African naval pre-eminence.

The majority of the combat suite has largely been designed and built by South African companies. The "SA Corvette Group" includes Altech Defence Systems, Kentron, LIW Division of Denel, Futuristic Business Solutions, Saab Avitronics, Grintek Electronics, Reutech and African Defence Systems (a joint venture between Altech and Thales)

=== Naval guns ===
The ships are equipped with one OTO Melara 76 mm/62 compact Naval Gun. Depending on type of ammunition in use, a range of between 8–40 kilometres (5.0–24.9 mi) with a rate of fire of 85 rounds per minute. For air targets, effective range is reduced to 4 km (2.5 mi).

They also mount one Denel 35mm Dual Purpose Gun (CIWS). The weapon's primary role of providing vessel point defence against aerial hostiles and missiles, with a secondary purpose of engaging surface and shore targets. With a range of ammunition, effective firing range for air targets is 4 km, with maximum firing range for surface vessels at 6 km (3.7 mi). High speed missiles can be intercepted at a 1.5 km (0.93 mi) range.

Two Mk1 Oerlikon 20 mm cannon are also fitted. They have a maximum engagement range of 6 km, with an effective range of 2 km (1.2 mi). A sustained rate of fire of 900–1,000 rounds per minute.

Two 12.7 mm Reutech Rogue machine guns are mounted with rate of fire over 1,000 rounds per minute, with an effective range of 1.8 km (1.1 mi) and a maximum firing distance of 7.4 km (4.6 mi).

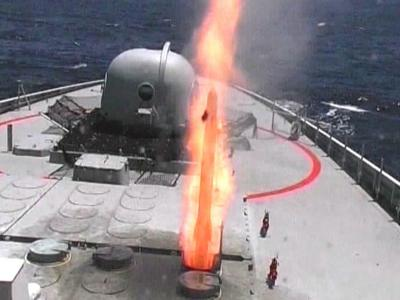
An Umkhonto missile being fired from a Valour-class frigate

=== Anti-air warfare ===
The ships are fitted with a 32-cell (four 8-cell modules) vertical launching system, although only 16 of these cells are typically armed with Denel Dynamics Umkhonto-IR Block II surface-to-air missiles during peacetime, each with a range of up to 15 km (9.3 mi). The remaining cells can be armed within a few hours if required, bringing the total loadout to 32 missiles. The Umkhonto system can engage up to four targets simultaneously, and the all-weather missiles can reach distances of 8 km in approximately 18 seconds while maintaining resistance to countermeasures.

=== Anti-surface warfare ===
The vessels are fitted with two 4-cell launchers for up to eight MBDA MM40 Block 2 Exocet surface-to-surface missiles, with a range of 72 km (45 mi). Maximum speed of 1,148 km/h (713 mph), with sea-skimming capabilities, preprogramed manoeuvres, active radar seeker and a high explosive fragmentation warhead.

=== Anti-submarine warfare ===
The ships are fitted for but not equipped with two 324 mm (13 in) torpedo tubes.

=== Countermeasures ===
The ships are equipped with Saab Grintek Avitronics SME 100/200 ESM (Intercept and Jammer) & ELINT and two Saab Grintek Avitronics MRL Super Barricade chaff launchers (96 decoys) for countermeasures.

=== Electronic systems and sensors ===
40% of each vessel's costs are related to the combat-management system installed on the Valour class, with 75% of the combat suite being developed in South Africa.

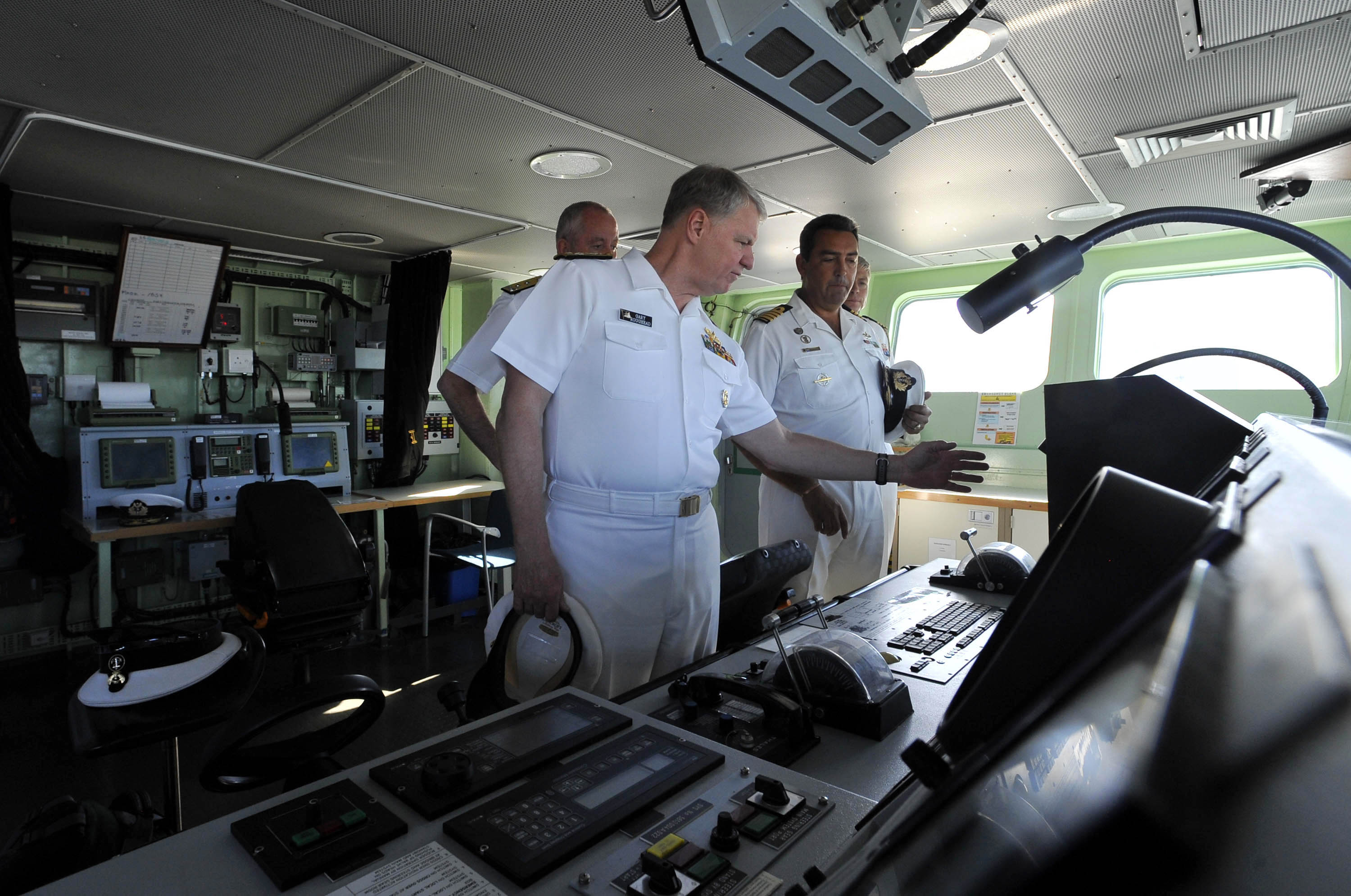
Capt. Jimmy Schutte, commanding officer of SAS Mendi, gives US Navy commanders a tour of the bridge of the South African Navy Valour-class frigate

The frigates mount a Thales Naval France MRR-3D NG G-band multi-role surveillance radar which is a lightweight phased array antenna that operates as both a surveillance radar and a self-defence system sensor with automatic mode switching. The MRR-3D NG in surface mode can detect low and medium-level targets at ranges of up to 140 km (87 mi), and in long-range 3D air surveillance setting up to 140 km. For self-defence, any threat within a radius of 60 km can be detected and tracked.

Two Reutech RTS 6400 monopoles X band (I/J bands) combined radar and optronic trackers are also equipped that are a high performance, domestically designed and manufactured radar tracker with a 60 km operational range. They also mount a Teutech Electro-optical Tracker, a Tellumat Integrated Naval Identification Friend or Foe System, M-Tek Target Designation Sights, a Thales UMS4132 Kingklip Sonar, and an MDS 3060 Obstacle Avoidance Sonar.

Also included is a computer-based "Naval Logistic Management System" that controls the on-board maintenance planning and execution by automatically generating weekly check-lists and repair schedules. Replenishment at sea can take place over the bow, over the stern, or amidships. Liquid and dry goods as well as passengers weighing up to 250 kilograms (550 lb) can be transferred this way. Vertical replenishment via helicopters can take place over the helideck and/or the foredeck.

=== Aviation ===
The hangar and flight deck design enables a wide range of helicopter options to fit requirements such as:

Two Westland Super Lynx or

One Westland Super Lynx and two UAVs or

One Atlas Oryx or

One Denel Rooivalk

== Upgrades and future technologies ==
In 2016 it was announced that the Valour class would benefit from a mid-life upgrade over the next decade that would extend service life beyond 2035, with improvement to both capability and capacity. However, as of 2021 the mid-life programme is still reportedly in the concept and feasibility study phase, with further progress on hold due to lack of adequate funding. Of four frigates in the class, only Amatola had undergone a partial refit in 2014–15. Plans for refitting three of the four remaining frigates were to be finalised based on the availability of funding to enable phased refits. The navy planned to prioritize essential maintenance and repair of the frigates Spioenkop and Mendi in the interim. In August 2021 the Department of Defence reported to Parliament that the average cost estimate for a frigate refit was R687 million. Were funding to be made available, envisaged possible upgrades included:

- The main naval gun, the OTO Melara 76 mm/62 compact, will be upgraded to enhance both fire-support and self-defence capabilities. The current calibre has long been known to be an interim cost-saving measure, with senior naval officials well aware that the gun is far too small to support operations. Improvement could range from the more affordable: upgrading the 76 mm/62 from Compact to Super Rapid, with the rate of fire increasing from 85 rounds per minute to 120, to the more costly: replacement with the 127 mm/64 Lightweight Naval Gun. Depending on the type of ammunition in use, range could increase from 40 to 120 km (25 to 75 mi) compared to the 76 mm/62. Although a slower rate of fire at 32 rounder per minute, the 127mm/62 would offer far greater hitting power. The naval gun is already in service with four navies, with another three as future operators, including Spain, the Netherlands and Canada. The Algerian El Radii-class frigate is equipped with the 127 mm/64, and is in essence a sister class to the Valour as the El Radii are also based on the MEKO A-200 design.
- Land attack missiles: the class deliberately lacks a land-attack cruise missile capability for political reasons: such weapons are seen by some as “too aggressive” and out of keeping with the Valour-class's “defensive posture”. However, like its peers the South African Navy recognises the growing importance of fighting in the littoral battlespace and supporting land forces during operations. As a result, a land attack missile capability is likely to be investigated as funds become available and sensitivities are assuaged.
- Current stock of Exocet MM40 Block 2 antiship missiles 72 km (45 mi) range, will be upgraded to Block 3 standard of 180 km (110 mi) range.
- The Denel Umkhonto surface-to-air missile will be upgraded to maintain superiority over evolving threats. Current stocks are of the short range point-defence Umkhonto-IR missile with an operational radius of 15 km (9.3 mi). It has not yet been announced whether the South African Navy wish to purchase the improved medium range, area defence, infrared homing (Umkhonto ER-IR) with a radius of 30 km (19 mi), or the highly capable beyond visual range Umkhonto-R with a radius of over 60 km (37 mi), which is still in development alongside the Brazilian Navy. Alternatively, enhancements have been made to the current IR Block 2 missile, with ranges extended from 15 km to over 20 km (12 mi). This could therefore be the most affordable option.
- The Thales MRR G-band air/surface search radar and the majority of the electronic warfare suite, such as the Grintek EWASION system and the Saab Avitronics radar support system will be replaced.
- The existing combat management system, including the Electro-optical tracker will be replaced, or upgraded by a new system.
- New rigid hull inflatable boats (RHIBs) with improved communication systems will be carried.
- Embarked Super Lynx maritime helicopters will have enhanced self-protection systems.
- After operational experience in the Mozambique Channel on anti-piracy duty, the class will be fitted with bow thrusters to improve manoeuvrability when working in confined and austere ports in the region.
- Autonomous underwater vehicles (AUV): It is anticipated each of the frigates and the multi-purpose hull vessels will carry an AUV for minehunting purposes, obviating the need for specialist vessels.
- Unmanned aerial vehicles (UAV): The Navy is following the ongoing development of rotor-propelled UAVs and plan to purchase some, to a scale of two per ship, when the technology matures.
- Indications suggest that the class will be equipped with close-in detection systems in order to face new threats that have emerged in the littoral environment. IED technology has spread to the African region and reports of missile attacks by non-state actors have increased in recent years.

== Ships of the class ==
Ship name	Builder	Laid down	Launched	Commissioned	Status
SAS Amatola (F145)	Blohm + Voss, Hamburg	2 August 2001	6 June 2002	16 February 2006 Simon's Town	In Service
SAS Isandlwana (F146)	Howaldtswerke, Kiel	26 October 2001	5 December 2002	20 July 2006 Simon's Town	In Service
SAS Spioenkop (F147)	Blohm + Voss, Hamburg	28 February 2002	2 August 2003	17 February 2007 Simon's Town	In Service
SAS Mendi (F148)	Howaldtswerke, Kiel	28 June 2002	October 2003	20 March 2007 Simon's Town	In Service

=== Naming ===
The MEKO A-200SAN ships of the South African Navy are collectively called the Valour class, and each commemorates an incident of conspicuous bravery. "The symbolism, however, is not in the battle itself, and who the victors were, but the extreme valour shown by the forces involved — both the victors and the defeated" said navy spokesman Commander Brian Stockton.

Amatola is named for the redoubt of the famed Xhosa chief Sandile, who fought British colonial expansion in the 19th century,

Isandhlwana is named after the hill dominating the site of one of the most famous battles of the Anglo-Zulu war of 1879.

Spioenkop is named for the January 1900 battle between Boer and British forces for the possession of the hill on the banks of the Thukela (Tugela) River in what is now KwaZulu-Natal. Spioenkop hill marks the site of one of the bloodiest battles of the 1899–1902 Anglo Boer War.

There is a progression in the names and the fourth frigate takes its name from a naval incident in World War I – but unlike the others, her name commemorates not a battle, but valour during a maritime disaster. The 4,230-gross-register-ton (GRT) passenger ship SS Mendi was ferrying the mostly-Pondo 5th Battalion, SA Native Labour Corps (SANLC) from Britain to France when the steamer collided with the 11,000 GRT liner SS Darro during the early hours of 21 February 1917. Described as South Africa's worst naval disaster, 607 members of the SANLC, nine of their white countrymen and 33 British sailors died when the troopship sank eleven miles (18 km) off St Catherine's Light in the English Channel. The Rev. Isaac Wauchope Dyobha led the doomed men in funeral song and dance as their ship went down. On her way home from Germany, SAS Mendi, with HMS Nottingham, laid a wreath at the coordinates of the disaster on 23 August 2004.

== Operational deployment ==
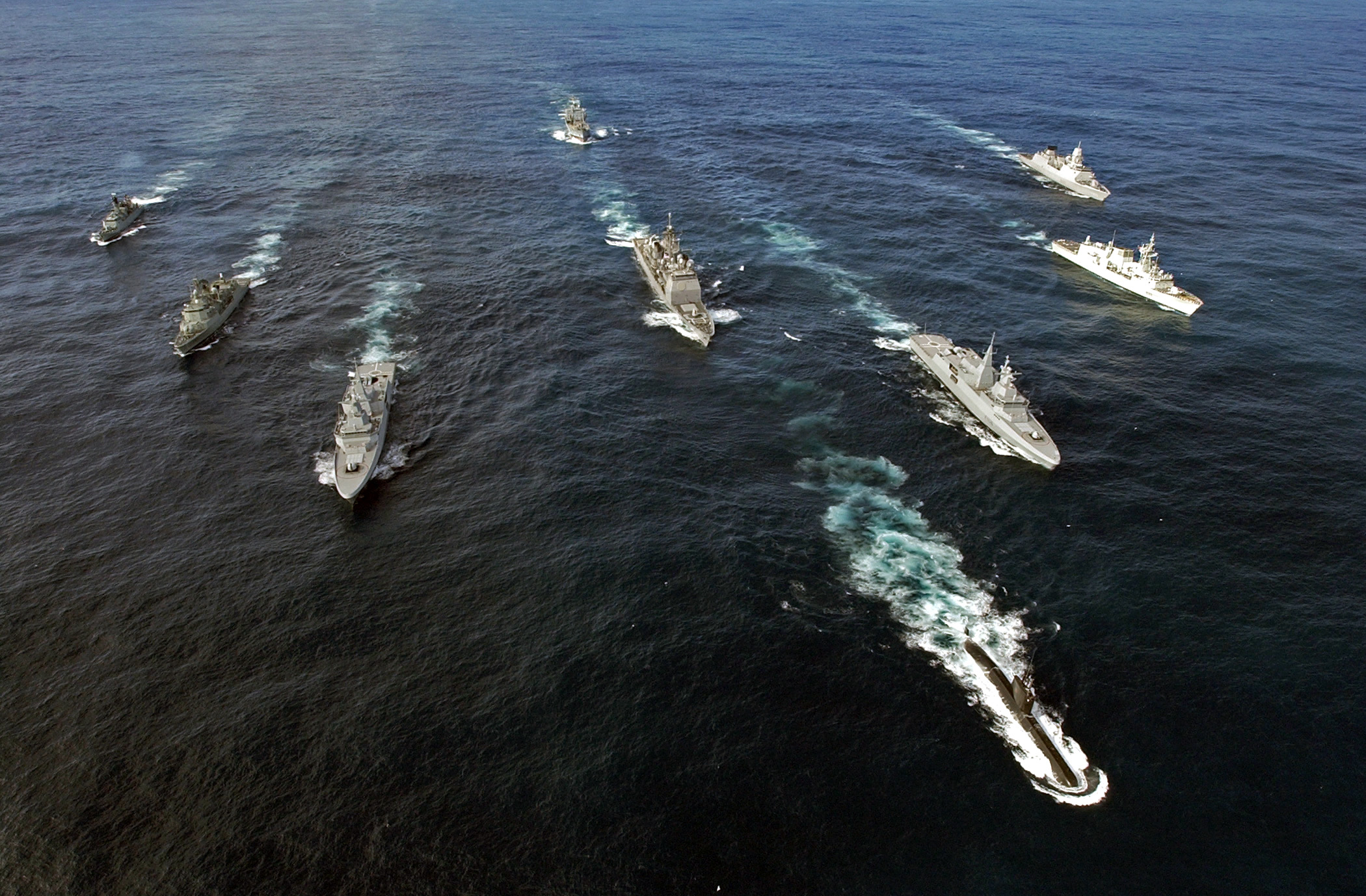
The Standing NATO Maritime Group (SNMG) 1 in formation with South African navy warships SAS Amatola, SAS Isandlwana and the submarine SAS Manthatisi while participating in Exercise Amazolo

Since the Valour class were commissioned in 2006/2007, the four frigates have been the South African Navy's most capable and important surface assets. Although the likelihood of a naval engagement with another state actor in the Southern African region is highly unlikely in South African planning, the frigate force maintains a credible military deterrent and protects national interests. The main operational duties of the Valour class have been engaging in anti-smuggling operations, fishery protection, participating in African Union peacekeeping missions and tackling regional piracy with international partners. The class have also been heavily utilised in international training exercises and visits with other naval forces, particularly the United States Navy, the German Navy, the French Navy and the Royal Navy.

In 2010, the four frigates were deployed to provide air and sea security for the FIFA World Cup that was being hosted by South Africa. Three frigates, at any one time, acted as guardships off the cities of Cape Town, Port Elizabeth and Durban.

Since 2011 the deployment to the Mozambique Channel to tackle piracy under Operation Copper has been one of the major and long-standing focuses of the frigate force. After increased piracy for a number of years, fellow South African Development Community members requested help in policing the crucial import and export sea lane. Since the beginning of operations, every frigate has been deployed on rotation and maritime piracy has fallen substantially, with marines regularly being embarked in order to board suspect vessels.

== See also ==
- List of active South African Navy ships
- List of frigate classes in service

Equivalent frigates of the same era

- Type 054
- Formidable class
- Absalon class
- Fridtjof Nansen class
- Project 11356R
- Incheon class
