= HMAS Bathurst =

Two ships of the Royal Australian Navy have been named HMAS Bathurst, for the city of Bathurst, New South Wales.

- HMAS Bathurst (J158), lead ship of the Bathurst-class corvettes, launched in 1940 and sold for scrap in 1948
- HMAS Bathurst (ACPB 85), an Armidale-class patrol boat commissioned in 2006 and active as of 2016

== Battle honours ==
Two battle honours have been awarded to ships named HMAS Bathurst:

- Indian Ocean 1942–44
- Pacific 1945
