= SAS Isandlwana =

2002 Valour-class frigate

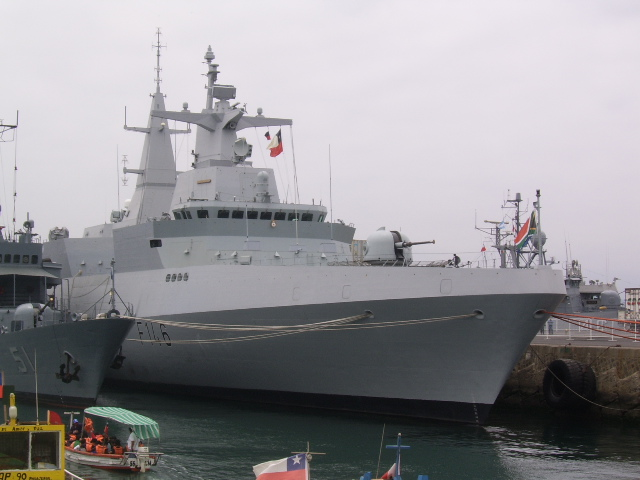
- SAS Isandlwana at Valparaíso, Chile on 1 December 2006

History

South Africa
- Name: SAS Isandlwana
- Namesake: Battle of Isandlwana
- Operator: South African Navy
- Ordered: 3 December 1999
- Builder: Howaldtswerke-Deutsche Werft, Kiel
- Laid down: 28 October 2001
- Launched: 5 December 2002
- Commissioned: 20 July 2006
- Home port: Simonstown
- Status: Ship in active service (but non-operational)

General characteristics
- Class & type: Valour-class frigate
- Displacement: 3,700 long tons (3,759 t)
- Length: 121 m (397 ft 0 in)
- Beam: 16.34 m (53 ft 7 in)
- Draught: 5.95 m (19 ft 6 in)
- Propulsion: CODAG WARP; 2 × Diesels 5,920 kW (7,939 hp) each; 2 shafts; 1 × Gas turbine 20,000 kW (26,820 hp); 1 Waterjet
- Speed: 30 knots (56 km/h; 35 mph)
- Range: 8,000 nmi (15,000 km) at 16 knots (30 km/h; 18 mph)
- Complement: 152
- Sensors & processing systems: Surveillance Radar: Thales Naval France MRR-3D NG G-band multi-role radar; Optical Radar Tracker: 2 Reutech RTS 6400 monopulse X-band (I/J bands) combined radar and optronics trackers; Electro-optical Tracker: Reutech Electro-optical tracker; Identification Friend or Foe: Tellumat Integrated Naval IFF system; Target Designation Sights: M-Tek Target Designation Sights; Sonar: Thales UMS4132 Kingklip sonar; Obstacle avoidance sonar: MDS 3060
- Electronic warfare & decoys: ESM/ECM: Saab Grintek Avitronics SME 100/200 ESM (Intercept and Jammer) & ELINT; Decoys: 2 Saab Grintek Avitronics MRL Super Barricade chaff launchers (96 decoys)
- Armament: 1 × Otobreda 76 mm gun; 1 × twin barreled 35 mm (Denel) dual-purpose gun; 2 × Oerlikon 20 mm cannon Mk1; 8 × MBDA MM40 Exocet Block 2 SSM (2 × 4-cell launchers); 16 × Umkhonto SAM (2 × 8-cell vertical launchers)
- Aircraft carried: 1 × SuperLynx 300 (can carry 2)
- Aviation facilities: Flight deck; Enclosed hangar

SAS Isandlwana (F146) is the second of four Valour-class frigates for the South African Navy built by the European South African Corvette Consortium. SAS Isandlwana was named after the Battle of Isandlwana at a ceremony held in Kiel in December 2002, by Deputy Defence Minister Nozizwe Madlala-Routledge.

== Construction ==
SAS Isandlwana was manufactured by the European South African Corvette Consortium (ESACC), consisting of the German Frigate Consortium (Blohm+Voss, Thyssen Rheinstahl and Howaldtswerke Deutsche Werft), African Defence Systems (part of the French Thales defense group) and a number of South African companies.

The ships were built to the MEKO modular design concept and are designated by the manufacturer as the MEKO A-200SAN class. Some controversy exists as to the class type of the vessel, with both the manufacturer and the South African Navy referring to her as a "corvette," but other similar vessels in other navies being referred to as frigates. Some have claimed the use of the word "corvette" was a political decision made by the South African government to ease criticism of the procurement of the vessels.

SAS Isandlwana was built at the Howaldtswerke-Deutsche Werft shipyards in Kiel, Germany, and she arrived in South Africa on 25 February 2004.

In 2007, SAS Isandlwana took part in the Atlasur Exercise in cooperation with the fleets of Brazil and Chile.

== Status ==
According to a presentation made to the Joint Standing Committee on Defence by Rear Admiral B.K. Mhlana, Deputy Chief of the Navy in May 2023, Isandlwana had been scheduled for a refit in both 2012 and 2018 but no work had been done to date. Her mid-life update was scheduled for 2024. The admiral described the ship as effectively non-operational until a refit could be completed.

== Namesake ==
As with all the other ships of the Valour class, Isandlwana is named after a famous South African battle or instance of great valour. In this case the famous Battle of Isandlwana between the Zulu nation and the British Empire, at the beginning of the Anglo-Zulu War.

== Notable deployments ==
- Exercise Atlasur VI
- Expo Naval in Chile
- Exercise Amazolo
- Exercise Red Lion
- Exercise Good Hope III
- Exercise Ibsamar I
- Exercise Atlasur VII
