= SAS Spioenkop =

South African frigate commissioned in 2007

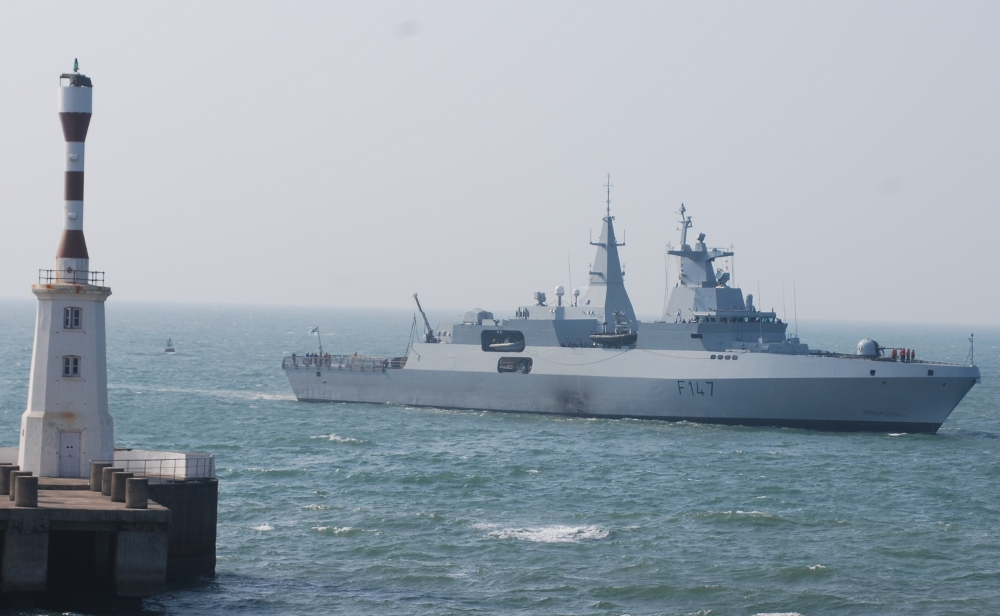
- SAS Spioenkop (F147) during Exercise IBSAMAR

History

South Africa
- Name: SAS Spioenkop
- Namesake: Battle of Spion Kop
- Ordered: 3 December 1998
- Builder: Blohm+Voss, Hamburg
- Laid down: 28 February 2002
- Launched: 2 August 2003
- Commissioned: 16 February 2007
- Home port: Simonstown
- Status: In active service (but non-operational)

General characteristics
- Class & type: Valour-class frigate
- Displacement: 3,700 tons
- Length: 121 m (397 ft)
- Beam: 16.34 m (53.6 ft)
- Draught: 5.95 m (19.5 ft)
- Propulsion: CODAG WARP; 2 × diesels 5,920 kW (7,939 hp) each; 2 shafts; 1 × gas turbine 20,000 kW (26,820 hp); 1 waterjet
- Speed: 30 knots (56 km/h; 35 mph)
- Range: 8,000 nautical miles (15,000 km) at 16 knots (30 km/h)
- Complement: 152
- Sensors & processing systems: Surveillance radar: Thales Naval France MRR-3D NG G-band multi-role radar; Optical radar tracker: 2 Reutech RTS 6400 monopulse X-band (I/J bands) combined radar and optronics trackers; Electro-optical tracker: Reutech Electro-optical tracker; Identification friend or Foe: Tellumat Integrated Naval IFF system; Target designation sights: M-Tek Target Designation Sights; Sonar: Thales UMS4132 Kingklip sonar; Obstacle avoidance sonar: MDS 3060
- Electronic warfare & decoys: ESM/ECM: Saab Grintek Avitronics SME 100/200 ESM (Intercept and Jammer) & ELINT; Decoys: 2 Saab Grintek Avitronics MRL Super Barricade chaff launchers (96 decoys)
- Armament: 1 × Otobreda 76 mm gun; 1 × twin barreled 35 mm (Denel) dual purpose gun; 2 × Oerlikon 20 mm cannon Mk1; 8 × MBDA MM40 Exocet Block 2 SSM (2 × 4-cell launchers); 16 × Umkhonto SAM (2 × 8-cell vertical launchers)
- Aircraft carried: 1 × SuperLynx 300 (can carry 2)
- Aviation facilities: Flight deck; Enclosed hangar

SAS Spioenkop (F147) is the third of four Valour-class frigates for the South African Navy built by the European South African Corvette Consortium. She was named by Ms Thandi Modise, the then Chairperson of the Portfolio Committee on Defence, in Hamburg, Germany, on 4 June 2003.

== Construction ==
They were manufactured by the European South African Corvette Consortium (ESACC), consisting of the German Frigate Consortium (Blohm+Voss, Thyssen Rheinstahl and Howaldtswerke Deutsche Werf), African Defence Systems (part of the French Thales Group defence company) and a number of South African companies.

The ships were built to the MEKO modular design concept, and they are designated by the manufacturer as the MEKO A-200SAN class. Some controversy exists as to the class type of the vessel, with both the manufacturer and the South African Navy referring to her as a "corvette", but other similar vessels in other navies being referred to as frigates. Some have claimed that the use of the word corvette was a political decision made by the South African government to ease criticism of the procurement of the vessels.

SAS Spioenkop was built at the Blohm + Voss shipyards in Hamburg, Germany, and arrived in South Africa on 31 May 2004.

== Namesake ==
As with all the other ships of the Valour class, Spioenkop is named after a famous South African battle or instance of great valour. In this case the famous Battle of Spion Kop between the Boers and Britain, during the Anglo-Boer War.

== Notable deployments ==
=== Exercise Whippet ===
The South African Navy conducted its first combined tactical Exocet missile firing exercise when the frigates, SAS Spioenkop and SAS Mendi, fired two missiles (one from each frigate) at MFV Azalea, an old fishing trawler donated to the SA Navy by I&J fishing company for use a target ship. The firing was conducted on 28 June 2007 in Exercise Area Pandora, 50 nautical miles (93 km) south of Cape Point.

=== Exercise Dolphin 2008 ===
A joint naval exercise between Ghana and South Africa. The following ships were involved in the exercise, SAS Spioenkop and the Ghanaian Naval vessels Anzone, Bonsu, Yogaga, Sero and Achimota. Activities included simulated opposed and unopposed boarding, fleet work as well as rescue assist. To add to this schedule there was a contingent of Ghanaian media representatives on board, who were ferried between the different vessels.

=== Exercise Greenpoint 2008 ===
This was an exercise in preparation for the FIFA 2010 World Cup Soccer tournament, as part of Operation KGWELA. A combined exercise with SANDF and SAPS personnel took place over the period 13 to 19 March 2008 in Cape Town to formalise the air defence concept for the tournament.

=== Operation Caraway 2008 ===
The ship conducted a three-month, six-country visit to the Far East. Spioenkop visited Singapore from 3–8 October, Shanghai in the People's Republic of China from 16–20 October, Kota Kinabalu in Malaysia from 25–29 October, Ho Chi Minh City in the Socialist Republic of Vietnam from 31 October to 5 November), Cochin in India from 14–20 November and Port Louis in Mauritius from 26 November to 1 December. The ship conducted naval exercises with the Singaporean Navy, the People's Liberation Army Navy of the People's Republic of China, the Indian Navy and the Mauritian Coast Guard. The ship's company also engaged in various diplomatic related activities with all the countries visited.

=== FIFA World Cup 2010 ===
SAS Spioenkop patrolled the coast during the 2010 FIFA World Cup and provided its radar for anti-aircraft surveillance to boost security for the event.

=== IBSAMAR II trilateral exercises 2010 ===
SAS Spioenkop took part in the trilateral exercise along with ships from the South African, Indian and Brazilian navies.

=== Exercise Red Lion ===
Held annually, Exercise Red Lion is run by Fleet Command and concentrates its efforts on preparing all available vessels for future Force Employment as a Task Group. The latest exercise was held between 4 and 15 March 2013 around Cape Town.

=== Exercise Shared Accord 2013 ===
SAS Spioenkop participated in a beach landing exercise on 29 July as part of the bilateral Exercise Shared Accord between the United States and South Africa.

=== Interop West Deployment 2013 ===
The ship conducted a six-week Military Diplomatic Mission to the West Coast of Africa from October to November. She visited Namibia, Angola, Nigeria, Ghana, Equatorial Guinea and Senegal.

=== Operation Copper 2013-2014 ===
The ship conducted a five-month anti-piracy mission in the Mozambique Channel from 28 December 2013 to 14 May 2014. The mission for Operation Copper is to provide maritime security and prevent piracy in the Mozambique Channel. The vessel was relieved by the offshore patrol vessel SAS Galeshewe.

== Refits ==
After the ship returned from her deployment on Operation Vikela as part of the SADC Mission in Mozambique, Spioenkop was scheduled to enter an extensive maintenance period. According to a presentation made to the Joint Standing Committee on Defence by Rear Admiral B.K. Mhlana, Deputy Chief of the Navy in May 2023, Spioenkop had been scheduled for refits in both 2013 and 2019 but no work had been done to date. Her mid-life update was scheduled for 2025. The admiral described the ship as effectively non-operational until a refit could be completed.
