= Reutech Rogue =

South African remote weapon system

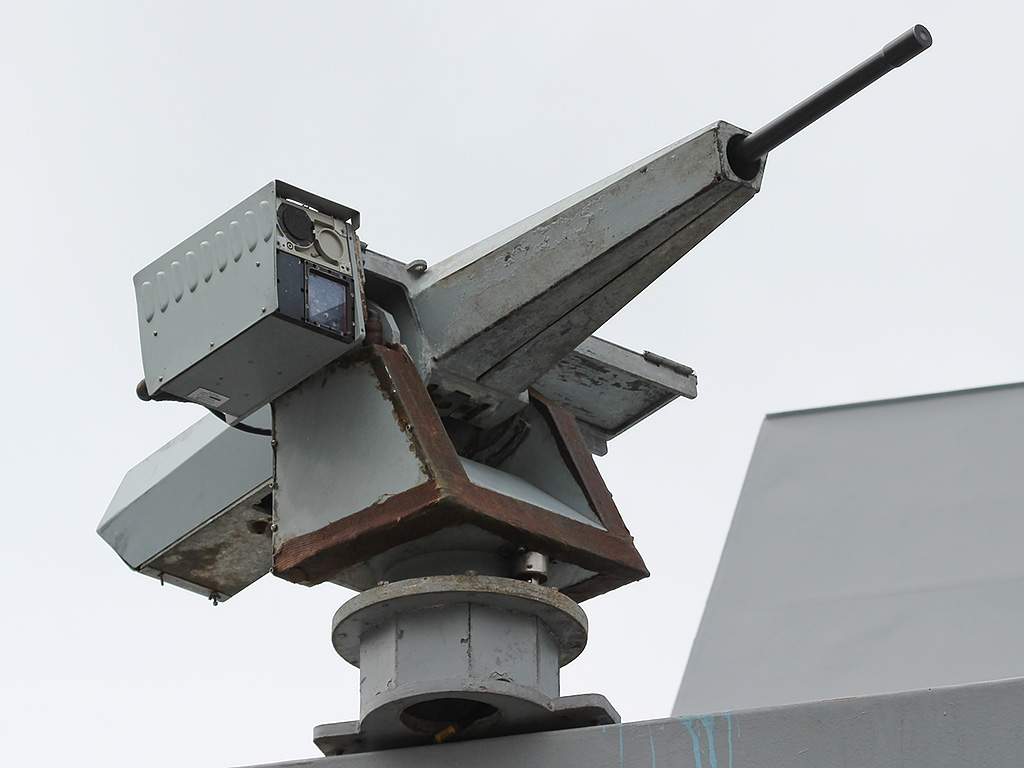
A Sea Rogue remote weapon system fitted with a 12.7 mm machine gun mounted on a Valour class frigate of the South African Navy.

The Reutech Rogue remote weapon system is a remotely controlled turret system for weapons ranging from 7.62 mm general purpose machine guns up to 20 mm cannons or a 40mm automatic grenade launcher. A version for anti-tank guided missiles has also been developed. There are versions for land and maritime use manufactured in South Africa by Reutech Solutions.

== Features ==
The control system of both Land and Sea Rogue mounts consists of a console in the ship or vehicle with a display screen for the cameras on the mount and a simple joystick control. The turret is gyro-stabilised and electrically driven. An optical observation and sighting system is mounted on the turret alongside the weapon with a variety of daylight and thermal imaging cameras and laser rangefinder. The standard option includes a 3 field-of-view daylight camera and a Sagem Matis SP cooled thermal night sight. An optional fit consists of a Sagem CM# MR uncooled infrared night sight, a 2 field-of-view day camera and a laser rangerfinder.

== Versions ==
The system is available in various version:

- The "original" Rogue is fitted with an M2 Browning 12.7mm heavy machine gun
- Cradle Rogue can interchangeably use a 7.62mm general purpose machine gun, a 12.7mm machine gun or a 40mm automatic grenade launcher
- Super Rogue has a 20x139 mm cannon, either the Denel Land Systems GI-2 or Nexter M693
- Missile Rogue mounts four ZT3 Ingwe anti-tank guided missiles and a 12.7mm heavy machine gun.

They are available in Sea or Land configurations for use on ships and boats or armoured vehicles respectively.

In September 2017 a new version, the Rogue Lite, was introduced. Designed for light armoured vehicles, it can be fitted with a 12.7 or 7.62 mm machine gun or a 40 mm automatic grenade launcher. A variety of optical sighting systems are offered.

== Users ==
- South African Navy - Two Sea Rogue systems fitted with M2 Browning 12.7mm heavy machine guns are used on the Valour class frigates.
- United Arab Emirates Coast Guard - Sea Rogue is used on 14/16m patrol boats.
- Benin Navy - Three patrol boats equipped with Super Sea Rogue armed with Denel Land Systems GI-2 20mm cannon.
- Malaysian Army - placed on their DefTech AV8 Gempita
