= HMAS Bathurst (ACPB 85) =

Armidale-class patrol boat

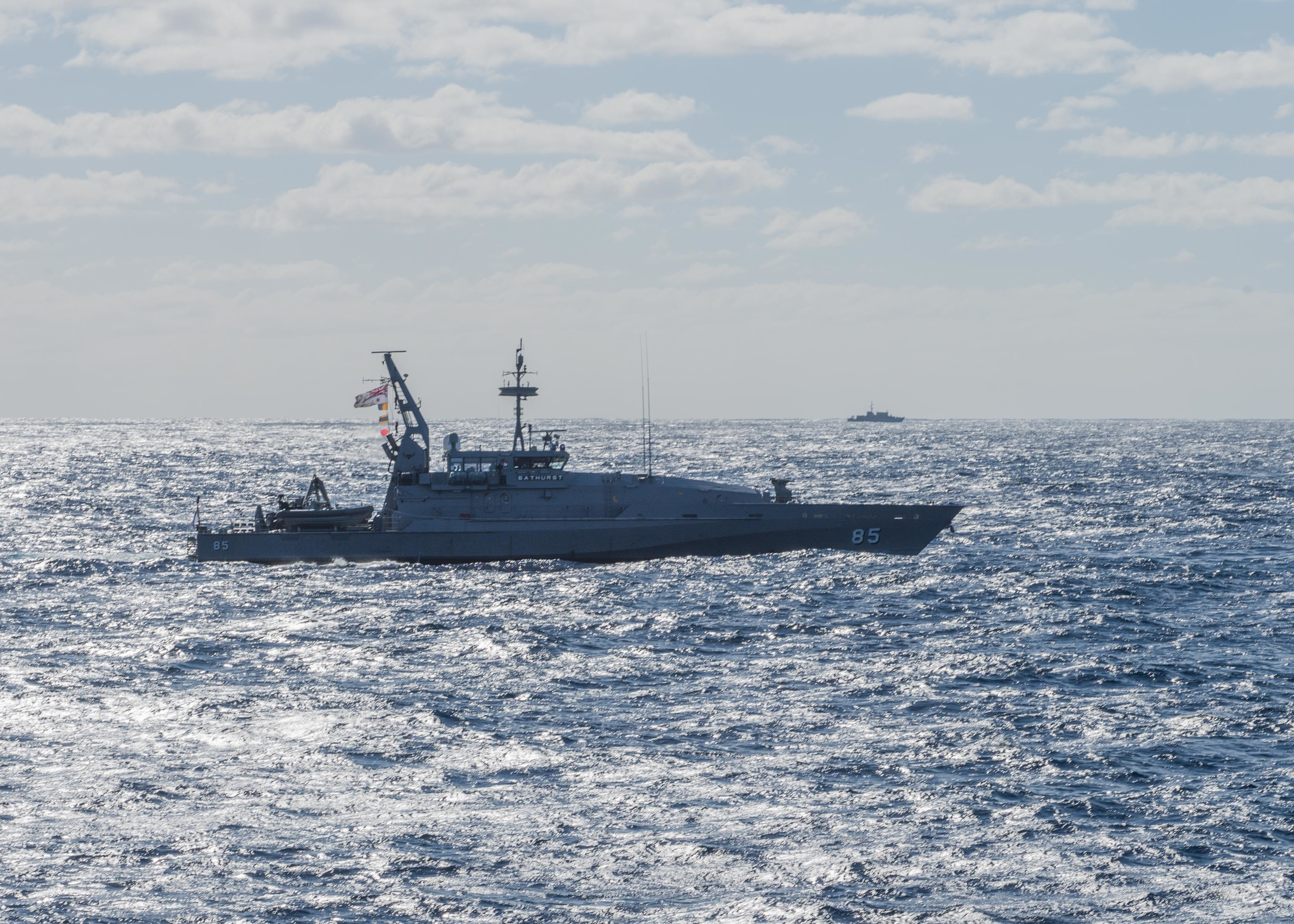
- HMAS Bathurst in July 2017

History

Australia
- Namesake: City of Bathurst, New South Wales
- Commissioned: 10 February 2006
- Decommissioned: 4 December 2025
- Home port: Darwin
- Identification: MMSI number: 503202000; Callsign: VKDF
- Motto: "Strike Hard"
- Honours and awards: Two inherited battle honours
- Status: Decommissioned
- Badge

General characteristics
- Class & type: Armidale class patrol boat
- Displacement: 300 tons standard load
- Length: 56.8 m (186 ft)
- Beam: 9.7 m (32 ft)
- Draught: 2.7 m (8.9 ft)
- Propulsion: 2 × MTU 4000 16V 6,225 horsepower (4,642 kW) diesels driving twin propellers
- Speed: 25 knots (46 km/h; 29 mph)
- Range: 3,000 nautical miles (5,600 km; 3,500 mi) at 12 knots (22 km/h; 14 mph)
- Endurance: 21 days standard, 42 days maximum
- Boats & landing craft carried: 2 × Zodiac 7.2 m (24 ft) RHIBs
- Complement: 21 standard, 29 maximum
- Sensors & processing systems: Bridgemaster E surface search/navigation radar
- Electronic warfare & decoys: Prism III radar warning system; Toplite electro-optical detection system; Warrlock direction finding system
- Armament: 1 × Rafael Typhoon stabilised gun mount fitted with a 25 mm (1 in) M242 Bushmaster autocannon; 2 × 12.7 mm (0.5 in) machine guns

HMAS Bathurst (ACPB 85), named for the city of Bathurst, New South Wales, was an Armidale-class patrol boat of the Royal Australian Navy (RAN). She was commissioned in 2006 and decommissioned on 4 December 2025

== Design and construction ==
The Armidale class patrol boats are 56.8 metres (186 ft) long, with a beam of 9.7 metres (32 ft), a draught of 2.7 metres (8 ft 10 in), and a standard displacement of 270 tons. The semi-displacement vee hull is fabricated from aluminium alloy, and each vessel is built to a combination of Det Norske Veritas standards for high-speed light craft and RAN requirements. The Armidales can travel at a maximum speed of 25 knots (46 km/h; 29 mph), and are driven by two propeller shafts, each connected to an MTU 16V M70 diesel. The ships have a range of 3,000 nautical miles (5,600 km; 3,500 mi) at 12 knots (22 km/h; 14 mph), allowing them to patrol the waters around the distant territories of Australia, and are designed for standard patrols of 21 days, with a maximum endurance of 42 days.

The main armament of the Armidale class is a Rafael Typhoon stabilised 25-millimetre (0.98 in) gun mount fitted with an M242 Bushmaster autocannon. Two 12.7-millimetre (0.50 in) machine guns are also carried. Boarding operations are performed by two 7.2-metre (24 ft), waterjet propelled rigid-hulled inflatable boats (RHIBs). Each RHIB is stored in a dedicated cradle and davit, and is capable of operating independently from the patrol boat as it carries its own communications, navigation, and safety equipment.

Each patrol boat has a standard ship's company of 21 personnel, with a maximum of 29. The Armidales do not have a permanently assigned ship's company; instead, they are assigned to divisions at a ratio of two vessels to three companies, which rotate through the vessels and allow the Armidales to spend more time at sea, without compromising sailors' rest time or training requirements. A 20-berth auxiliary accommodation compartment was included in the design for the transportation of soldiers, illegal fishermen, or unauthorised arrivals; in the latter two cases, the compartment could be secured from the outside. However, a malfunction in the sewerage treatment facilities aboard HMAS Maitland in August 2006 pumped hydrogen sulphide and carbon monoxide into the compartment, non-fatally poisoning four sailors working inside, after which use of the compartment for accommodation was banned across the class.

Bathurst was constructed by Austal at their shipyard in Henderson, Western Australia. She was commissioned into the RAN in Darwin on 10 February 2006.

== Operational history ==
Bathurst was based in Darwin and conducted border protection and fisheries protection patrols.

On 30 November 2012, an armed intruder boarded Bathurst while she was berthed at HMAS Coonawarra. The intruder subdued the sailor on duty, before stealing two rifles and twelve pistols from the ship's armoury and escaping. The weapons were recovered the following day, and by 21 December, two men had been arrested: a sailor charged with the actual robbery, and a civilian found in possession of the stolen guns.

Bathurst was decommissioned on 4 December 2025
