= Umkhonto (missile) =

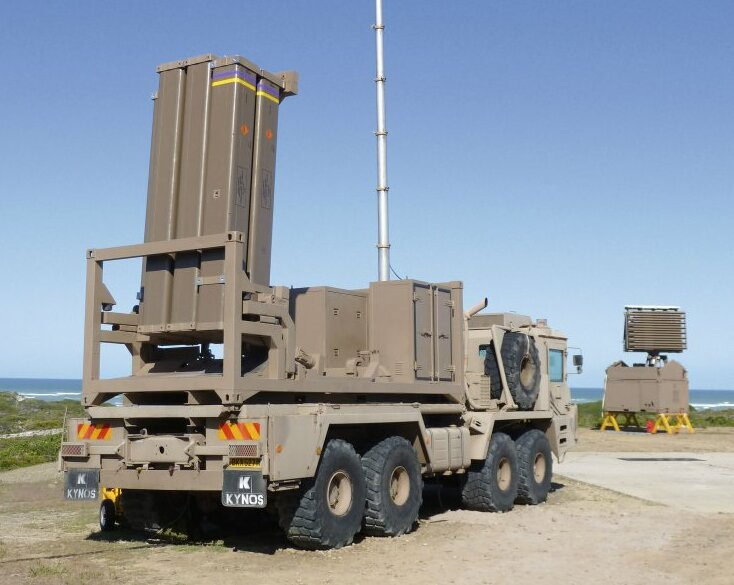
- Umkhonto missile system
- Type: Short to medium range surface-to-air missile
- Place of origin: South Africa

Service history
- In service: 2001
- Used by: South Africa, Finland, Algeria

Production history
- Manufacturer: Denel Dynamics
- Developed from: SAHV-3 Surface To Air Missile

Specifications
- Mass: 130 kg (290 lb)
- Length: 3.32 m (10.9 ft)
- Diameter: 180 mm (7.1 in)
- Wingspan: 500 mm (20 in)
- Warhead: 23 kg (51 lb)
- Operational range: 20 km (12 mi), Umkhonto-IR; 30 km (19 mi), Umkhonto-ER-IR; 60 km (37 mi), Umkhonto-R
- Flight altitude: 8 km (5.0 mi), Umkhonto-IR; 12 km (7.5 mi), Umkhonto-ER-IR; 15 km (9.3 mi), Umkhonto-R
- Maximum speed: Mach 2 (2470 km/h)
- Guidance system: All-aspect infra-red, command update fire and forget
- Launch platform: Naval Vertical launch system, Ground-based Launcher System

The Umkhonto (Nguni: Spear) is a family of vertical-launched, surface-to-air missiles developed by Denel Dynamics. Umkhonto is designed to be a modern, short to medium-range missile, with an all-weather launch capability. Operating at supersonic speeds, the Umkhonto utilises infrared homing technology to provide point and limited local air defence against multiple attacks of aircraft and missiles.

Denel initially developed the Umkhonto to equip the four Valour-class frigates of the South African Navy with an anti-air capability, with the first successful naval launch achieved in 2005 from SAS Amatola. The South African Army has also invested in the project as part of a programme to replace the obsolete, and now retired, Cactus mobile short-ranged ground-based air defence system. The Umkhonto has secured notable export success, with the missile currently being operated by Finnish and Algerian naval forces.

Umkhonto is available in three variants, a short-range infrared homing (Umkhonto-IR), a medium-range infrared homing (Umkhonto-ER-IR) and a beyond-visual-range radar homing version (Umkhonto-R).

== Characteristics and Design ==
Umkhonto has been designed to counter a wide variety of airborne threats, such as multiple combat aircraft (fixed-wing or rotary), anti-ship missiles, anti-radiation missiles, UAVs, and supersonic cruise missiles. When coupled with a modern air-defence system and multi-function surveillance track and guidance radars, the Umkhonto missile system has the capability to simultaneously engage multiple targets during saturation attacks.

Prior to launch, the target is acquired and tracked by 3D target acquisition radar. Upon launch, the missile flies to a lock-on point, following on-board inertial navigation. The missile then activates its two-colour IR-seeker and locks on. Target updates are received via data link, enabling the missile to counter evasive manoeuvres by the target.

The Umkhonto has a set of tail-mounted, aerodynamic control fins, as well as thrust vectoring vanes in the motor nozzle (similar to Denel's A-Darter AAM), allowing for 40g manoeuvring. The missile uses a low-smoke propellant to avoid detection. The sealed container has a cylindrical pad shape, and during start-up reactive gases are reflected from the bottom of the container and go straight up between the walls of the container and the body of the rocket. Reloading the launcher is made either on the basis of, or in a calm sea using an auxiliary vessel. High reliability is achieved through the built-in self-test hardware that provides the minimum cost of maintenance staff.

== Development ==
Research and development of the Umkhonto began in 1993, after the failure to introduce into service and market the ZA-HVM short-range surface-to-air missile that used the SAHV-3 missile (together with the ZA-35 anti-aircraft gun), which in turn was designed to replace the obsolete ‘Cactus’ missile system which had been in service since 1971. South Africa decided to continue to develop its own missile system, one of the few countries in the world to do so. Even after the lifting of UN sanctions, the international high-end missile systems, such as the United States Aegis programme, were unaffordable for South Africa, whilst the lower-end cheaper alternatives were deemed not satisfactory, although the SAHV Missile program failed it was the foundations for the modern Umkhonto.

=== Naval ===
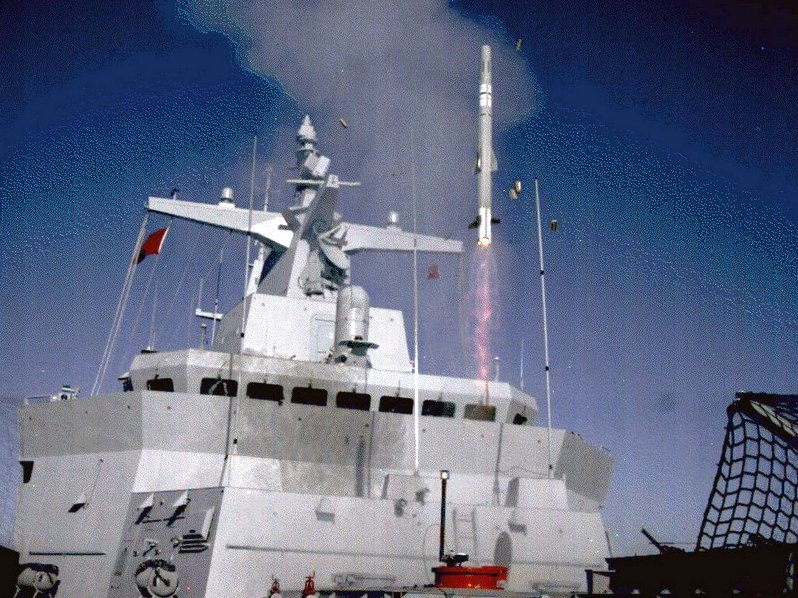
Umkhonto IR Missile being launched from a South African Navy Valour-class guided-missile frigate

Initial design and development was concluded by the end of the 1990s, with Umkhonto-IR (infrared) first entering limited production in 2001. Testing from land-based facilities was undertaken in July 2005, with Skua supersonic drone targets being intercepted. The naval version of the Umkhonto-IR, developed alongside the frigate acquisition programme of the Strategic Defence Package 1999, saw successful testing being carried out from the SAS Amatola in November 2005. A single high-speed Skua was intercepted off Cape Agulhas, with a second round of testing undertaken the following week. Both naval tests used telemetry warheads in order to provide inflight data for technicians. The intercepts lasted less than 30 seconds from target detection to simulated destruction, with ranges achieved being better than originally expected. Test launches were also conducted during rough sea conditions, with significant roll and pitch. Technical data from testing demonstrated that integration of the missile launch system into the combat suite had been successful, and that the roll and pitch data from the Inertial Navigation System, via the Navigation Distribution System, had been correctly assimilated. Further trials during Exercise Good Hope III in 2008 proved successful in intercepting supersonic targets, as well as subsonic.

==== Finnish co-operation ====
In a substantial coup for Denel, in 2002 the Finnish Navy selected the Umkhonto-IR to equip its four Hamina-class missile boats, beating fierce competition from the US-German Rolling Airframe Missile, and the Swedish Bofors Bamse. Umkhonto was also selected to equip the Hämeenmaa-class minelayer during their period of modernisation in 2006.

Denel Dynamics, in collaboration with the Finnish Navy, have undertaken a joint development programme of enhancing the Umkhonto-IR, specifically adapting the missile for superior capability when operating in the Baltic Sea. A more advanced seeker-head algorithm has been developed that can differentiate between the target and background clutter, which is of particular importance in the confines of the Baltic Sea. The Umkhonto-IR Block II has a more efficient flightpath, allowing for an increased maximum range of 15 km (9.3 mi): an increase of 3 km. The missile also has increased resistance to electronic countermeasures.

In 2010, the new Block II missile was demonstrated at the Africa Aerospace & Defence international exhibition in Cape Town. The Finnish Navy later reported the successful testing of the Block II in Uusimaa, Finland, with two Banshee UAVs being intercepted and destroyed. After the subsequent development of the Umkhonto-IR Block II, with orders being placed by the South African and Finnish navies, all production was discontinued for the Block I.

=== Land ===
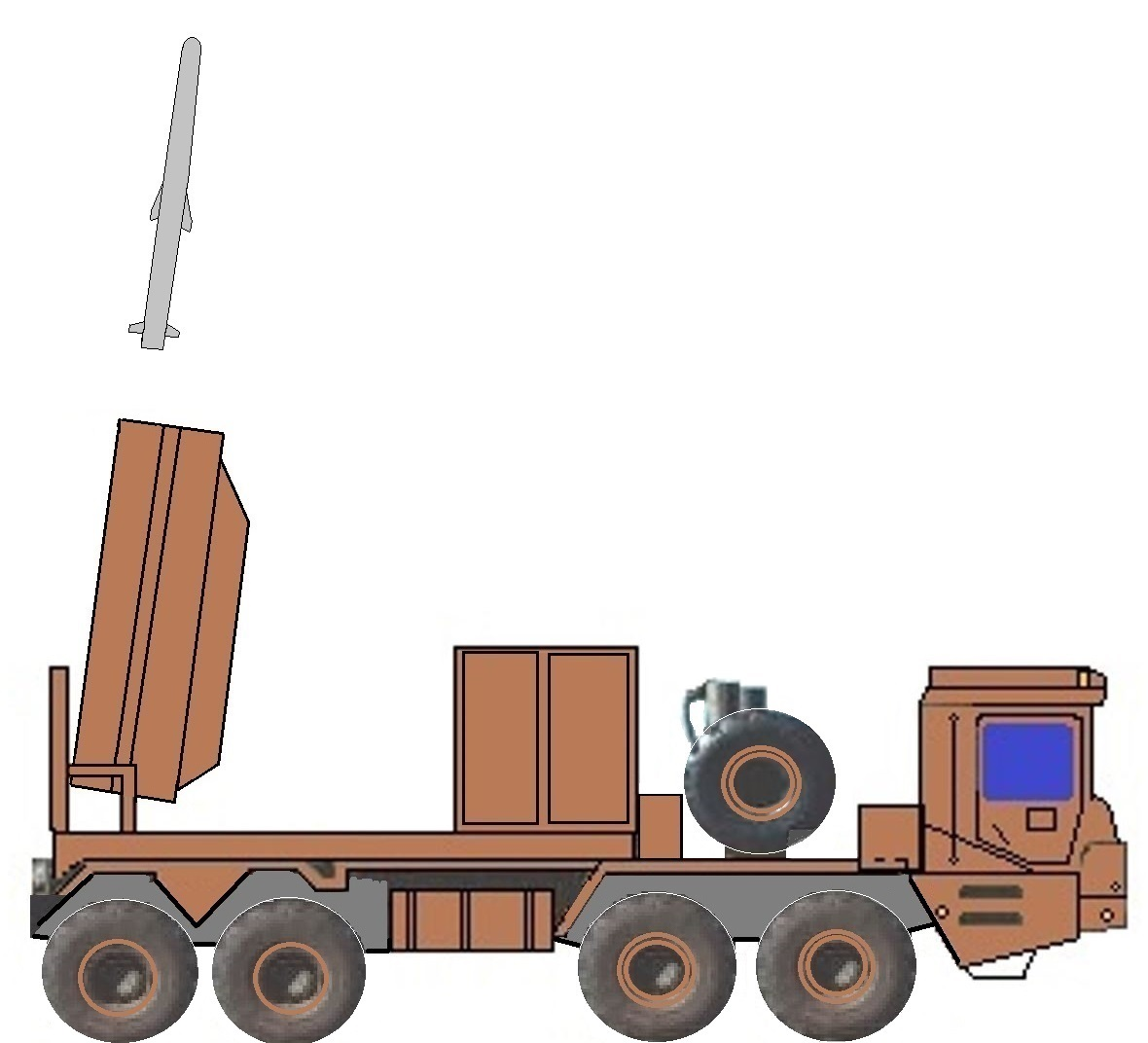
Umkhonto Ground-based air defence system (GBADS)

After successful coastal tests in July 2005, further land trials were carried out over two days in October 2013 with a modified version of the Umkhonto-IR Block II. Undertaken at the Denel Overberg Test Range, live fire exercises saw three missiles successfully intercept and destroy low-cost aerial target systems (LOCATS): two at 15 km range and one at 20 km.

The South African Army is currently undertaking a programme to field a mobile short-range ground-based air defence system (GBADS), known as the Protector Project. In addition to the modified Umkhonto surface-to-air missile, the air defence system will include three-axis radars, Starstreak air defence systems and dual 35mm anti-aircraft guns.

Denel has developed the Ground-based Launcher (GBL) for the Umkhonto missile, able to target high-speed aerial threats. The GBL is a versatile, compact and mobile surface-to-air vertical launching system (VLS), similar to the naval application, that provides 360 defences against simultaneous air attack from aircraft and missiles. Transportable by land, sea and air, the launcher can be rapidly encamped or decamped due to its highly mobile and autonomous capabilities. Easily integrated into larger ground-based or naval air defence systems, the launcher features eight reloadable launch tubes that allow for rapid reloading.

== Variants ==
=== Standard Design Characteristics ===
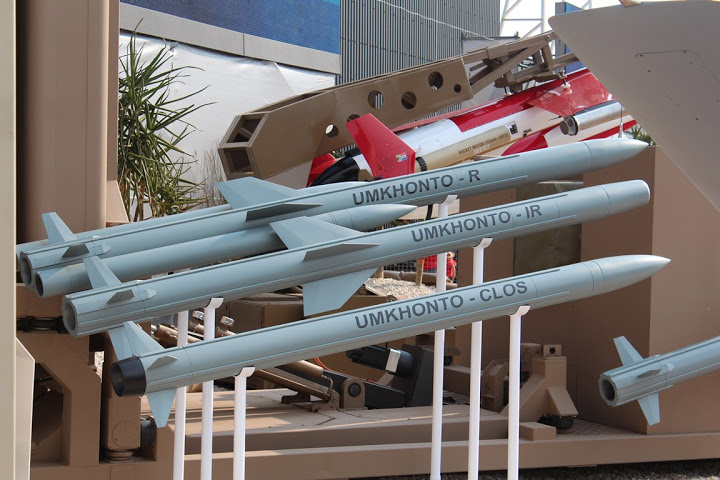
Umkhonto-R, Umkhonto-IR and Umkhonto-CLOS missiles

- Mass: 130 kg (290 lb)
- Length: 3.32 m (10.9 ft)
- Wingspan: 0.5 m (1.7 ft)
- Diameter: 180 mm (7.1 inch)
- Warhead: 23 kg (51 lb) - proximity fuse

=== Umkhonto-IR Block I ===
Performance Characteristics

- Maximum Range: 12 km (7.4 mi)
- Maximum Ceiling: 10 km (6.2 mi)
- Maximum Speed: Mach 2 (2,450kmh/1,522 mph)

The first variant of the Umkhonto surface-to-air missile, the Block I, was initially developed in response to the South African military requirement to upgrade existing short-ranged aerial defence capability. Later, as South Africa undertook a project to purchase four modern frigates in 1999, the Umkhonto was selected to provide naval surface-to-air defence.

Entering limited production from 2001, the Block I was designed to provide 360-degree coverage against airborne threats up to supersonic speed. The Block I was reportedly the first Vertical Launch System Infrared surface-to-air missile to be developed anywhere in the world, also being the first to operate a lock-on after launch mode.

Initial operational capability began in 2006 when the Umkhonto began to equip the newly constructed and delivered South African Valour-class frigates. In 2002, soon after production began and before final testing was concluded, the Finnish Navy signed a multi-million rand contract for the supply of the Umkhonto missile and associated fire control equipment. Under the Finnish Squadron 2000 Project, four Hamina-class missile boats and two Hämeenmaa-class minelayers would be equipped with the Umkhonto for the primary air defence mission against incoming sea-skimming missiles and attack aircraft. The contract represented a major coup for the South African defence industry as the bid was selected ahead of far more established North American and European rivals.

Production of the Block I has been gradually reduced, and has now been discontinued after the unveiling of the improved Block II in May 2010.

=== Umkhonto-IR Block II ===
Performance Characteristics

- Maximum Range: 15 km (9.3 mi) - 20 km (12.4 mi)
- Maximum Ceiling: 8 km (4.9 mi)
- Maximum Speed: Mach 2 (2,450kmh/1,522 mph)

The Block II is an improved version of the Block I, allowing for greater range and an enhanced seeker-head algorithm that can more easily differentiate between the target and background clutter. Unveiled at the Africa Aerospace & Defence International Exhibition in Cape Town in 2010, the Block II is a product of deep cooperation between Denel Dynamics and the Finnish Navy. Specifically designed for the close confines of the Baltic Sea, the Block II, along with a more advanced seeker-head, can negotiate a more efficient flightpath when engaging a target. As a result, the Block II has a range increase of 3 km, with a new operational range of 15 km; however, some sources say range has been continuously improved and is now at 20 km. With increased resistance to electronic countermeasures, the Block II can travel 8 km in just 18 seconds. The Block II is therefore both larger and heavier than the Block I, with the operational ceiling reduced from 10 km to 8 km.

=== Block III Umkhonto-ER-IR ===
Performance Characteristics

- Maximum Range: 35 km (21.7 mi)
- Maximum Ceiling: 12 km (7.4 mi)
- Maximum Speed: Mach 2 (2,450kmh/1,522 mph)

An extended range Umkhonto is currently being developed, with Denel Dynamics exploring new generation motors and other technology. At the 2017 International Defence Exhibition and Conference in the UAE, the Extended Range Umkhonto was announced, and if brought to fruition represents a significant step for Denel. The missile is seen as a potential cost-effective competitor to the MBDA Aster-15 and the CAMM, especially in the naval market of mid-to-lower military budgets.

Essentially a further upgrade of the Block II, the main improvement of the ER would be increased range to a maximum of 35 km, bringing the Umkhonto into the typical range of other high end multi-range surface-to-air missiles.

=== Umkhonto-R ===
Performance Characteristics

- Maximum Range : 60 km+ (37.2 mi+)
- Maximum Ceiling : 15 km (9.3 mi)
- Maximum Speed: Mach 2

Further research and development is focussed on enhancing the Umkhonto into becoming a true 'over-the-horizon' mid-to-long range missile, with a high-end reputation and capability. Denel is currently seeking outside partnership and investment to significantly improve the Umkhonto's potential. According to reports, the -R will be the first Umkhonto to be fitted with Active Radar Homing missile guidance, rather than the current Infrared. ARH missiles have higher kill probabilities, better resistance to countermeasures, and can be more accurate when tracking a target. The Umkhonto-R would have a maximum range exceeding 60 km, with an increased operating ceiling of 15 km.

== Current users ==
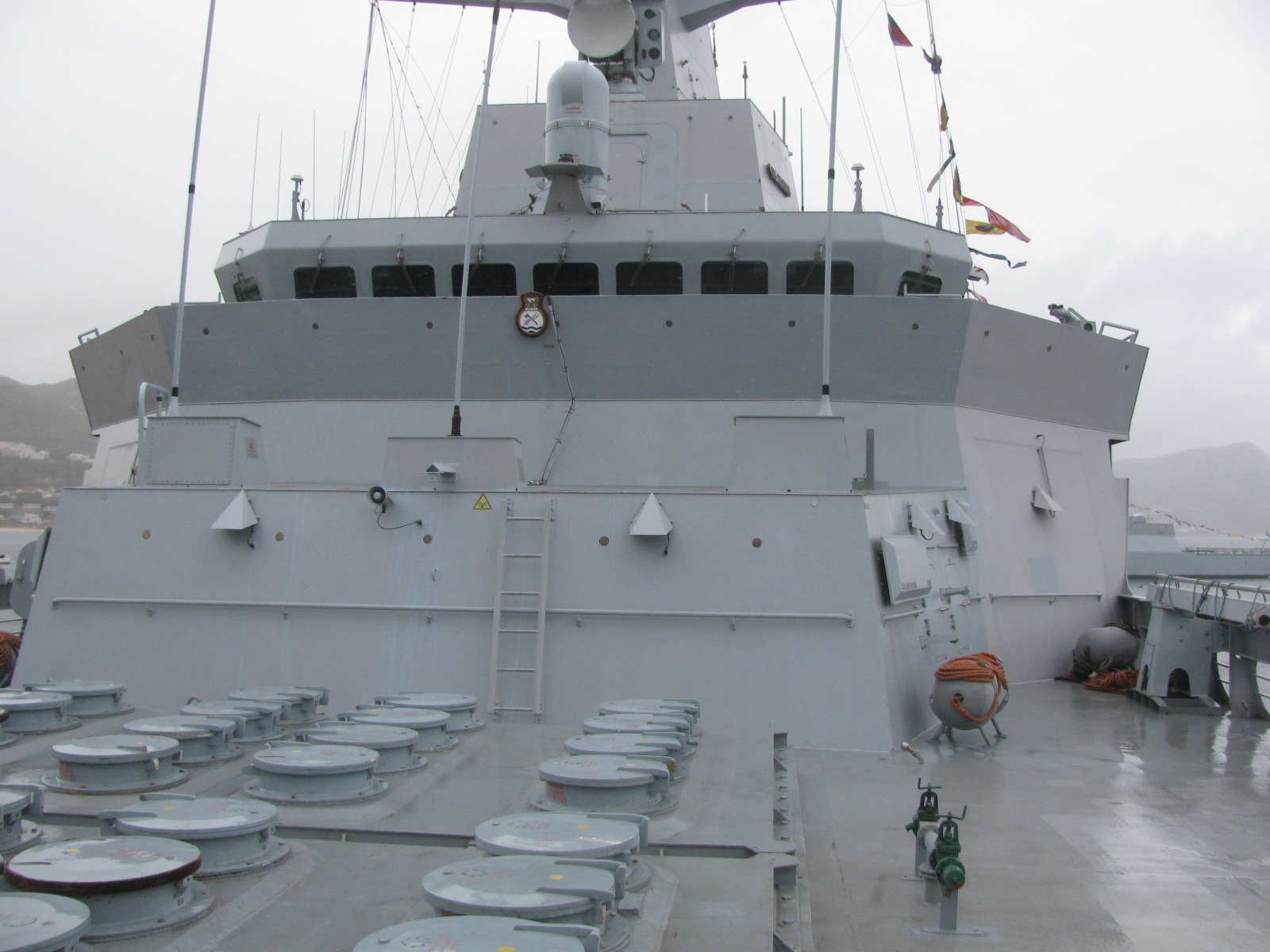
A South African Navy Valour-class frigate with 32 Vertical Launch cells containing Umkhonto IR Block 2 missiles

South Africa

- South African Navy: Umkhonto-IR Block II. Currently in service with all four Valour-class frigates. The Umkhonto was initially developed as a concept by Denel with the requirement to equip the future frigate force with a credible anti-air capability in the 1990s.

Finland

- Finnish Navy: Umkhonto-IR Block II (local designation ItO 2004). Currently in service with all four Hamina-class missile boats, and both Hämeenmaa-class minelayers. Initially selected in 2002, the original Block I has now been fully replaced by the Block II, with the Finnish Navy reportedly interested in purchasing further possible upgrades. In 2017 it was announced that the Umkhonto was likely to meet the requirements of selection for when the Hamina-class are refitted, and the Hämeenmaa-class replaced in the 2020s.

Algeria

- Algerian National Navy: Umkhonto-IR Block II. In 2012, Algeria selected the Umkhonto for use on its two new MEKO A-200 warships that had been ordered from Thyssenkrupp Marine. These ships are the same type as South Africa's own Valour-class frigates, resulting in heightened optimisation between the two countries. It was reported that Algeria has ordered 100 missiles from Denel, with production and integration being achieved in 2017. In December 2019, an Algerian MEKO A-200 successfully completed its first Umkhonto missile test.

== Future users ==
South Africa

- South African Army: Intention to integrate a modified land-based version of the Umkhonto into its Ground Based Air Defence System (GBADS) project. As part of a significant overhaul of its air defences, the Army has selected the Umkhonto to complement the recently acquired British Starstreak short-range missile, as well as its existing 23mm and 35mm air defence weapons.

== Failed bids ==
Egypt

- Egyptian Navy: In 2020, it was reported in South African media that a deal worth up to R6.3 billion ($370m) between Denel and the Egyptian Government had fallen through due to failure by Denel to secure a bank guarantee for the project due to its financial problems. Egypt has initially sought to procure 96 Umkhonto missiles for its Meko A200 frigates, currently under construction by ThyssenKrupp Marine Systems in Germany. The Umkhonto would have been a natural fit for the project as the A200 frigate is also in service with the South African and Algerian navies, both of whom currently field the Umkhonto. As a result, the Egyptian Government has subsequently chosen the French MBDA VL-MICA for the A200, with the missile already equipping the Gowind frigates in the Egyptian navy.

Sweden

- Swedish Navy: The Visby-class corvettes were originally intended to be equipped with Umkhonto-IR, but the deal was later cancelled due to budget cuts to the Swedish navy. The Visby-class corvettes will be fitted with surface-to-air missiles as part of their mid-life upgrade, although the MBDA CAMM was selected instead of Umkhonto in November 2023.

== See also ==
- Barak 8 – (India, Israel)
- CAMM (missile family) – (United Kingdom, Italy)
- Hisar (missile family) – (Turkey)
- MICA (missile) – (France)
