= 122 Squadron SAAF =

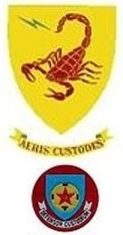
- 122 Squadron, part of 250 ADAG
- Active: 1970–1980s
- Country: South Africa
- Branch: South African Air Force
- Role: Missile based air defence

122 Squadron SAAF was a South African Air Force squadron formed in 1970 to operate the South African/French Cactus surface-to-air missile systems in an air defence role. The unit was disbanded when the Cactus system was retired from service in the late 1980s.

122 Squadron was the direct sister unit of 120 Squadron and was exactly set up and operated as such.

== History and deployment ==
In July 1964, South Africa placed a development contract with Thomson-CSF for a mobile, all-weather, low-altitude SAM system after a South African order for the Bloodhound SAM system was refused by the UK government. The South African government paid 85 per cent of the development costs of the system with the balance being paid for by France. The system was known as "Cactus" within the SAAF and "Crotale" in France. The units were operationally deployed in platoons in 1971 with each platoon consisting of one Acquisition and Co-ordination Unit (ACU) and two or three firing units, with a battery having two platoons. All Cactus air defence batteries were placed under command of 122 Squadron until the retirement of the system in the late 1980s.

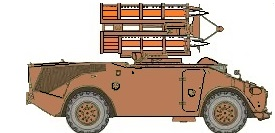
Cactus Missile System Firing Unit

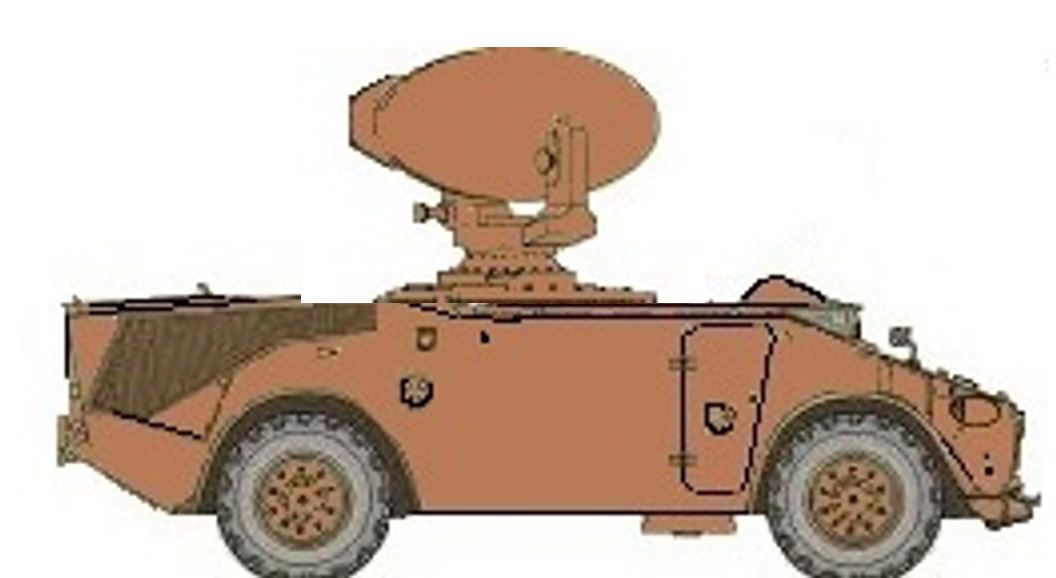
Cactus Missile Acquisition Unit

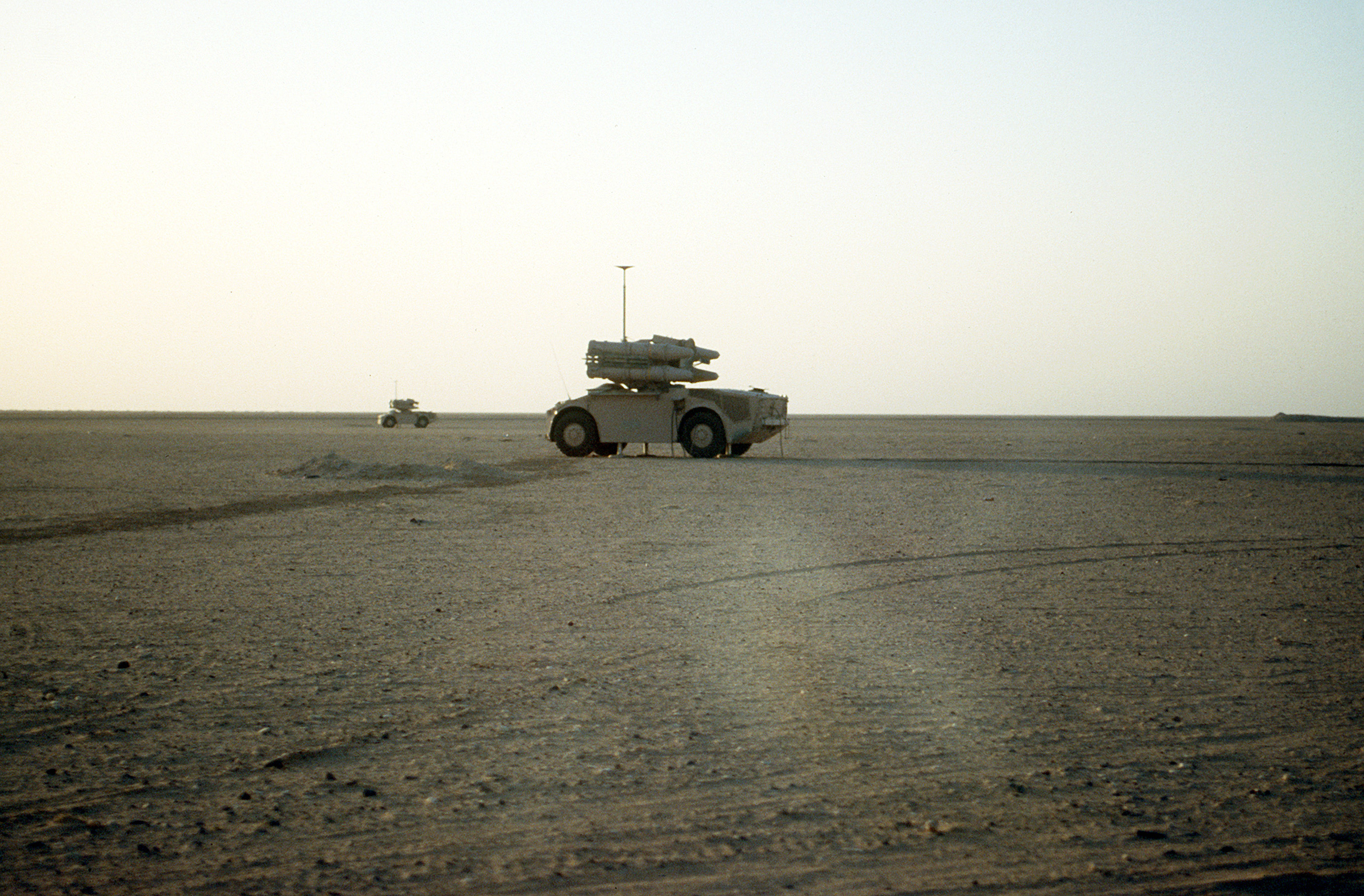
An Egyptian Crotale surface-air missile system, similar to that operated by 122 Squadron.
