= Denel 35 mm Dual Purpose Gun =

Type of naval close-in weapon system

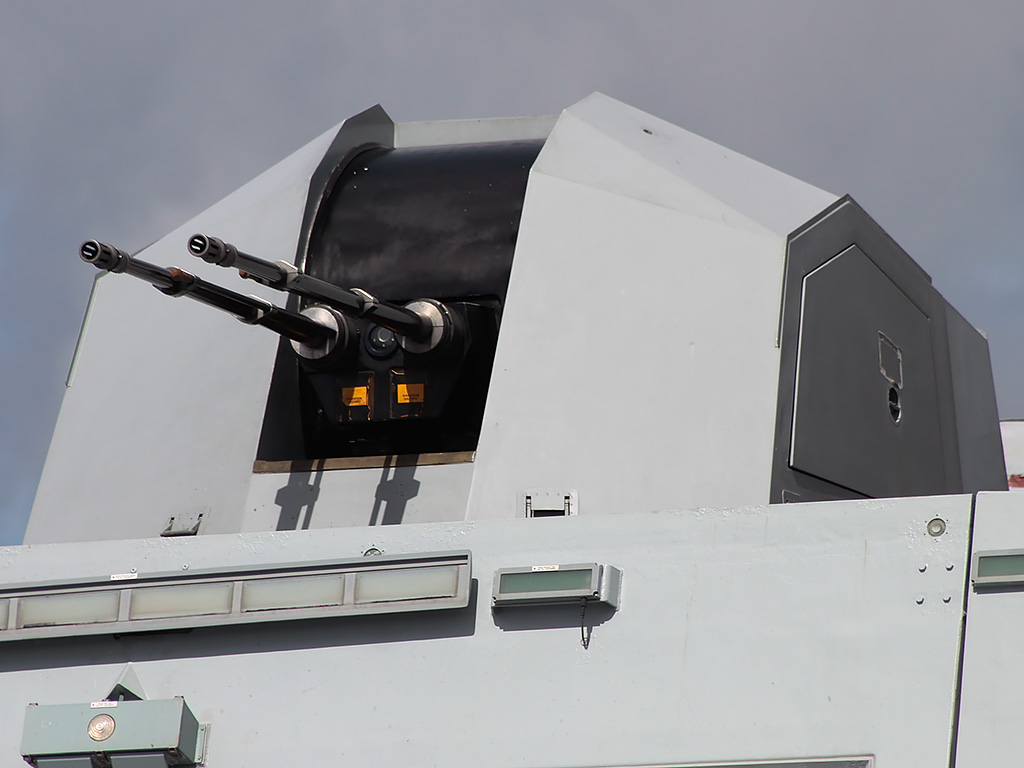
- Denel 35 mm Dual Purpose Gun on a Valour-class frigate of the South African Navy
- Type: Naval close-in weapon system
- Place of origin: South Africa

Service history
- In service: 2005
- Used by: South Africa

Production history
- Designer: Lyttleton Engineering Works (Denel)
- Manufacturer: Denel Land Systems

Specifications
- Mass: 5,500 kilograms (12,100 lb) (without ammunition); 6,500 kilograms (14,300 lb) (with ammunition)
- Length: 5.4 metres (210 in) (turret and barrels)
- Barrel length: 3.15 metres (124 in) (90 cal)
- Width: 2.9 metres (110 in) (turret)
- Height: 2.3 metres (91 in) (turret)
- Crew: None (but manual control is possible from the operator's console)
- Shell: 35×228mm NATO
- Calibre: 35 mm
- Barrels: 2
- Action: gas-operated
- Elevation: −10° to +85°
- Traverse: 360° (unlimited)
- Rate of fire: 2×550 rpm
- Muzzle velocity: 1,175 metres per second (3,850 ft/s)
- Effective firing range: 4,000 metres (4,400 yd) (air target)
- Maximum firing range: 6,000 metres (6,600 yd) (surface target)
- Feed system: Belt 2×240 rounds (one belt for each cannon)
- Sights: Radar and/or optronic (IR and visible)

The Denel 35 mm Dual Purpose Gun (35DPG) is an inner layer of defence (ILD) weapon system for warships built in South Africa by Denel Land Systems. It is currently in service on the Valour-class frigates of the South African Navy.

== Role ==
Its primary role is to defend against attack by helicopters, fixed-wing aircraft and missiles. It has a secondary role against surface vessels and shore targets, both in symmetrical and asymmetrical warfare and also in law enforcement where accuracy is critical because collateral damage is unacceptable.

== Design ==
The system consists of two GA35 rapid-fire automatic cannons derived from the Oerlikon 35 mm, mounted side by side in an unmanned low radar observable turret. Target acquisition is by the installed search and track radar, while either an electro-optic or optronic tracking system with infrared and visible spectrum modes provide target information. A control console is located in the ship's operations room, although the system operates automatically in the air-defence mode. An emergency control and maintenance panel is fitted on the rear of the turret. The turret does not penetrate the deck on which it is mounted. On the Valour class frigates it is mounted on top of the helicopter hangar. The turret is fully self-contained and requires only an electrical supply and a target data feed from the ship's combat management system and the control console. The turret is capable of unlimited full circle traverse at up to 70° per second and elevates from 10° below to 85° above horizontal at up to 40° per second.

The turret's on-board computers do the ballistic calculations and fire-control. The high level of self-containment and compact size and low weight allows installation on a wide variety of ships down to as small as 200 tonnes.

== Ammunition ==
The cannons fire the full range of NATO standard 35×228 mm ammunition; HEI, HEI-T, SAPHEI, APCI-T, Prac and Prac-T; all manufactured by Rheinmetall Denel Munition's PMP division.

=== Anti-missile ===
In the anti-missile role it uses advanced hit efficiency and destruction (AHEAD) ammunition from RWM Schweiz AG. This round ejects 152 tungsten projectiles at a predetermined distance, between 40 and 10 m, from the target. A 25-round burst of AHEAD rounds produces 3,800 of these small projectiles to destroy the incoming missile. Cruise missiles can be destroyed at 2.5 km and high-speed missiles at 1.5 km range.

The system's anti-missile capability is further enhanced by adding Denel's Closed Loop Fire Correction System, which tracks projectiles all the way to the target. This allows for real-time correction of bias errors in the control system and compensation for atmospheric conditions.

== See also ==
- Aselsan GOKDENIZ—comparable Turkish system
- DARDO—comparable Italian system
- Oerlikon Millennium 35 mm Naval Revolver Gun System—comparable Swiss-German system
