= South African National Defence Force =

Military of South Africa

- 10 other official names: Suid-Afrikaanse Nasionale Weermag (Afrikaans); IButho leSewula Afrika lezokuVikela leliZweloke (Southern Ndebele); UMkhosi woKhuselo weSizwe waseMzantsi Afrika (Xhosa); UMbutho Wezokuvikela WaseNingizimu Afrika (Zulu); Umbutfo Wetekuvikela Wavelonkhe waseNingizimu Afrika (Swazi); Sešole sa Tšhireletšo sa Bosetšhaba sa Afrika Borwa (Northern Sotho); Lebotho la Naha la Tshireletso la Aforika Borwa (Sotho); Sesole sa Tshireletso ya Naga ya Aforika Borwa (Tswana); Vutho ra Rixaka ra Vusirheleli ra Afrika-Dzonga (Tsonga); Tshiimiswa tsha Mmbi ya Vhupileli ya Afurika Tshipembe (Venda)
- Emblem of the SANDF

- Flag of the SANDF
- Motto: For the brave, for the proud
- Founded: 1 July 1912 (114 years, 80 days) (as Union Defence Force)
- Current form: 1994; 32 years ago
- Service branches: South African Army; South African Navy; South African Air Force; South African Military Health Service
- Headquarters: Pretoria, Gauteng, South Africa
- Website: dod.mil.za

Leadership
- Commander-in-chief: President Cyril Ramaphosa
- Minister of Defence and Military Veterans: Angie Motshekga
- Chief of the SANDF: General Rudzani Maphwanya

Personnel
- Military age: 18–49
- Conscription: No
- Active personnel: 68,731 (2024/25)
- Reserve personnel: 29,350 (2020/2021)

Expenditure
- Budget: US$3.60 billion (2025/26)
- Percent of GDP: 0.8% (2025)

Industry
- Domestic suppliers: Denel; Paramount Group; Milkor; Reutech Radar Systems
- Foreign suppliers: United Kingdom; United States; Germany; Sweden; France; Finland; Italy; Japan; Switzerland; Spain; Netherlands

Related articles
- History: Military history of South Africa; List of wars involving South Africa
- Ranks: South African military ranks

The South African National Defence Force (SANDF) comprises the armed forces of South Africa. The Chief of the SANDF is appointed by the President of South Africa from one of the armed services. They are in turn accountable to the Minister of Defence and Military Veterans of the Defence Department.

The military as it exists today was created in 1994, following South Africa's first nonracial election in April of that year and the adoption of a new constitution. It replaced the South African Defence Force and also integrated uMkhonto we Sizwe (MK), and the Azanian People's Liberation Army (APLA) guerilla forces.

== History ==
=== Integration process ===
In 1994, the SANDF took over the personnel and equipment from the SADF and integrated forces from the former Bantustan homelands forces, as well as personnel from the former guerrilla forces of some of the political parties involved in South Africa, such as the African National Congress's Umkhonto we Sizwe, the Pan Africanist Congress's Azanian People's Liberation Army and the Self-Protection Units of the Inkatha Freedom Party (IFP). The Azanian People's Organisation's AZANLA was invited but refused to be integrated and to this day remains the only guerrilla force not integrated into the current force.

As of 2004, the integration process was considered complete, with the retention of personnel, structure, and equipment from the SADF. However, due to integration problems, financial constraints, and other issues, the SANDF faced capability constraints.

The South African Commando System was a civil militia active until 2008, based upon local units from the size of company to battalion. In its final years its role was to support the South African Police Service during internal operations. During such deployments the units came under SAPS control.

=== 1999 re-armament ===
In 1999, a R30 billion (US$4.8 billion) purchase of weaponry by the South African Government was finalised, which has been subject to allegations of corruption. The South African Department of Defence's Strategic Defence Acquisition purchased frigates, submarines, light utility helicopters, lead-in fighter trainer and multirole combat aircraft.

=== Decline ===
Systemic public-sector corruption, State capture, (2011/12 to 2017) had a debilitating effect on Denel and consequently the country's defence capability. In 2014 some 62% of the SANDF's facilities and housing were deemed to be in unacceptable condition, of which 4% were hazardous, another 2% fit to be demolished, and some occupied by squatters. This contributed to low soldier morale and poor discipline. Equipment became largely obsolete due to inadequate maintenance, while renewal stalled with devastating effects on the defence industry. According to the Department of Defence's 2014 Defence Review, the SANDF was "in a critical state of decline". A series of cuts to its capital and operating budgets compromised several capabilities.

In 2017 and 2021 respectively, 83 and some 200 to 500 out-of-service military vehicles were destroyed in fires at the Wallmansthal vehicle depot, and a spokesperson was not available to liaise with the press. Notwithstanding, it was reported to parliament in 2022, that technical skills gained from personnel of the Cuban RAF facilitated the preservation and maintenance of over 600,000 infantry weapons. Their mechanical and vehicular skills allowed for the inspection, repair, refurbishment and/or deactivation of vehicles in the special forces and the four arms of service fleets, besides the implementation of stock control and technical support measures, and the rehabilitation of army workshops and work stations.

After submissions to parliament by Armscor, earlier in 2022, a spokesman for the official opposition, the DA, stated that the country's defence capability had been weakened to the extent that it was unprepared for a serious security challenge. The Navy and Air Force were highlighted as easy targets, as only one of the four frigates were serviceable, and none of the submarines, while only 46 of 217 fixed-wing aircraft were serviceable (with all VIP aircraft grounded), and only 27 of 87 helicopters. Budget and hardware constraints also compromised flight training and exercises, besides the retention of experienced pilots and personnel. The defence minister's appointment of an Air Force chief, Wiseman Mbambo, who cannot fly a plane and doesn't have a pilot's licence was also criticized. The SANDF had only 14 infantry battalions consisting of 12,000 soldiers in aggregate, of which five were deployed in peacekeeping and border patrol, leaving only nine to serve as home or rapid response units.

In February 2022 the power supply to its Navy headquarters in Pretoria was disconnected when its municipal taxes were in arrears to the amount of R3.2 million. During the same month Sandu threatened legal action if the dilapidated Air Force headquarters building in Pretoria were not repaired to facilitate acceptable working conditions. In March 2022 the SANDF and Navy were locked out of several office buildings in Pretoria due to rent defaults by the Department of Public Works. 63% of the 2022/23 defence budget was allocated to employee compensation.

In 2022 the SANDF was involved in multiple corruption scandals totaling R2 billion; one of which involved 56 SANDF personnel two of whom were generals all of whom were suspended. An additional 13 SANDF personal from the Logistics, Joint Operations and Special Forces divisions were convicted for corruption in another incident.

=== Domestic operations ===
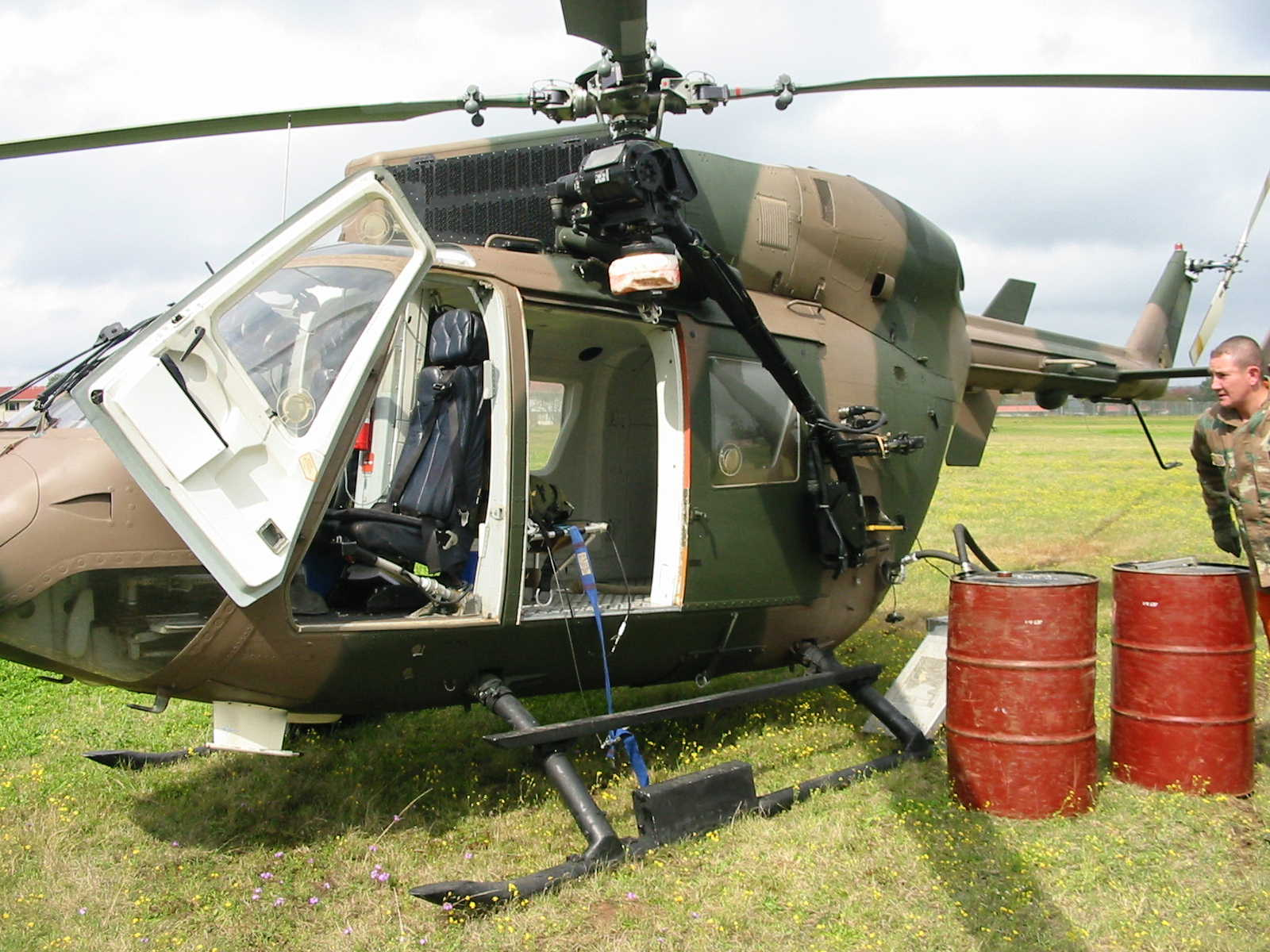
A SANDF helicopter being refuelled during the annual game census

As of 2012, the SANDF was involved in several internal operations, including:

- Safeguarding the border (Operation CORONA)
- Disaster relief and assistance (Operation CHARIOT)
- Safety and security (Operation PROSPER)
- Ridding the country of illegal weapons, drug dens, prostitution rings and other illegal activities (Operation FIELA)

In 2021, SANDF forces were deployed in response to the civil unrest following the jailing on corruption charges of former president Jacob Zuma. By 14 July, over 25,000 troops had been deployed, the largest single deployment of the South African National Defence Force since 1994.

=== International operations ===
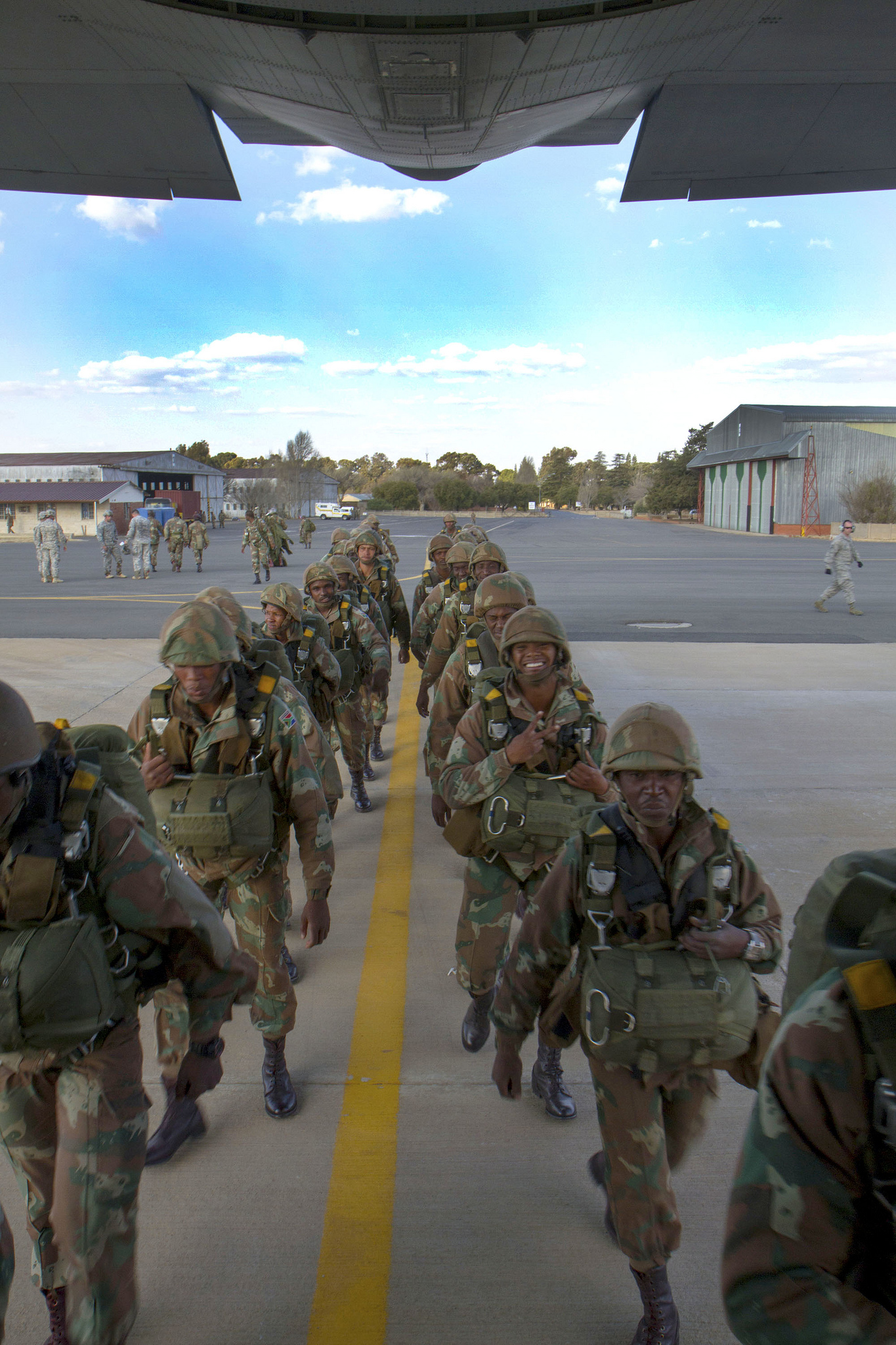
SANDF paratroops

The SANDF partakes in UN peacekeeping missions, mostly on the African continent. As part of the SADC standby force, it partakes in peace missions in the DRC and northern Mozambique. It also provides foreign election security when needed.

== Organisation and structure ==
Overall command is vested in an officer-designated Chief of the SANDF (CSANDF). Appointed from any of the Arms of Service, they are the only person in the SANDF at the rank of General or Admiral, and are accountable to the Minister of Defence and Veteran Affairs, who heads the Department of Defence.

The structure of the SANDF is depicted below:

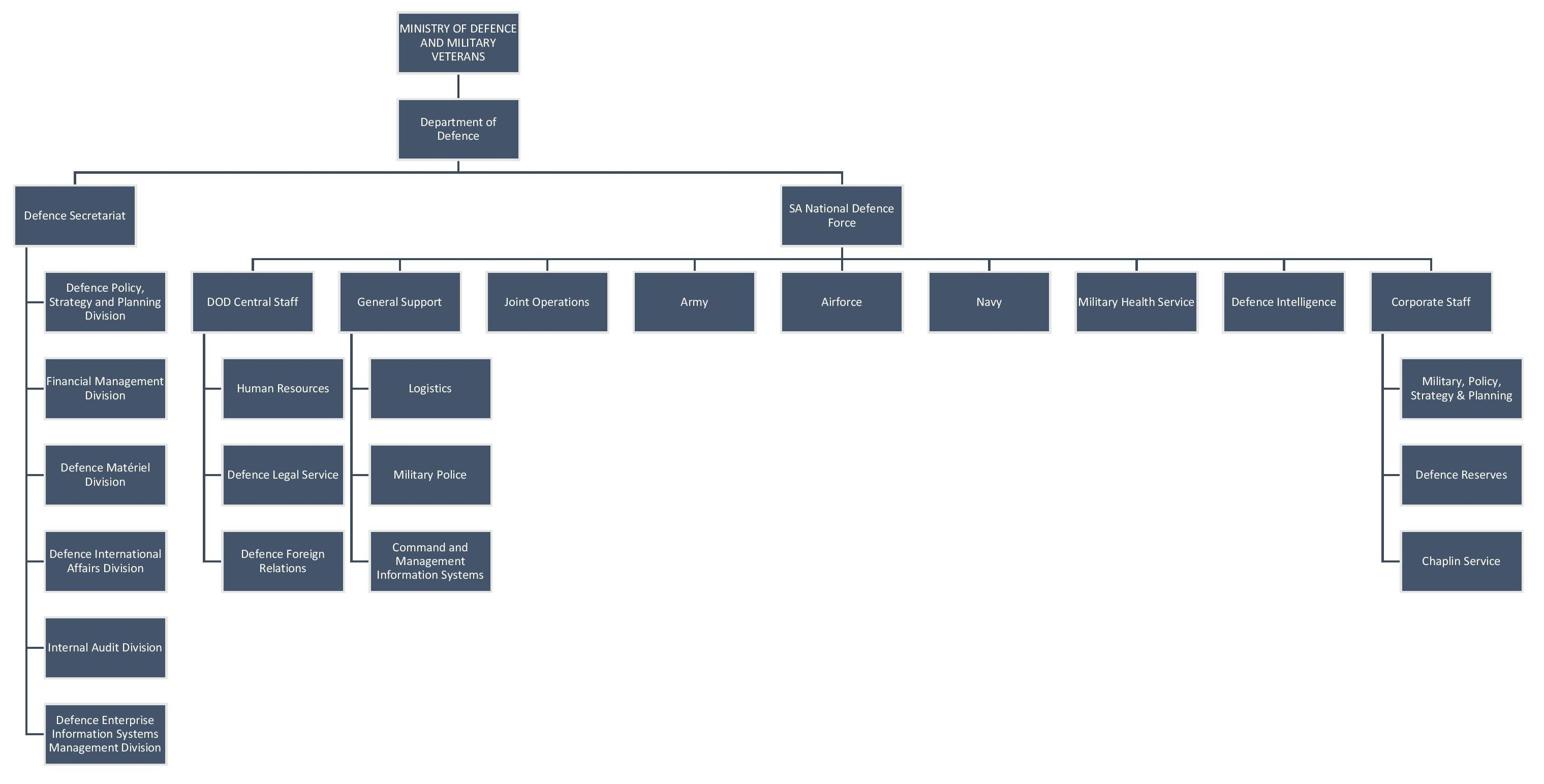
SANDF Organisation Chart 2019

In 2010, a Defence Amendment Bill created a permanent National Defence Force Service Commission (NDFSC), a statutory advisory body that reports to the Minister of Defence and Military Veterans. Its primary mandate is to review and make recommendations on the conditions of service, remuneration, career progression, and general welfare of SANDF personnel, both in the Regular and Reserve components.

The Commission plays a key role in ensuring that the interests of military personnel are represented at the highest levels of government and that the SANDF maintains professional standards in line with constitutional and legislative requirements.

Overall command is vested in an officer-designated Chief of the SANDF (CSANDF). Appointed from any of the Arms of Service, they are the only person in the SANDF at the rank of General or Admiral, and are accountable to the Minister of Defence and Veteran Affairs, who heads the Department of Defence.

The SANDF is structured into four main service branches:

- South African Army
- South African Air Force
- South African Navy
- South African Military Health Service

The Joint Operations Division is responsible for co-ordinating all Joint Operations involving any or all of the four services. The South African Special Forces Brigade is the only organic unit under the direct command of the Joint Operations division. Unlike most other special forces it is not part of the Army or any other branch of the SANDF.

=== Publications and access to records ===
The SANDF publishes (or provides links) to documents describing its strategy, plans, performance, white papers and related government acts. Under the Promotion of Access to Information Act 2000 (PAIA), the SANDF also provides access to current and historical information the SANDF holds and provides a manual with procedures for obtaining access. Some categories of records are "automatically available" that are "available without a person having to request access in terms of the PAIA. These records can be accessed at the Department of Defence Archives and include operational records of the 1st World War, 2nd World War, Korean War, and establishment of the Union Defence Force 1912.

== Branches ==
=== South African Army ===
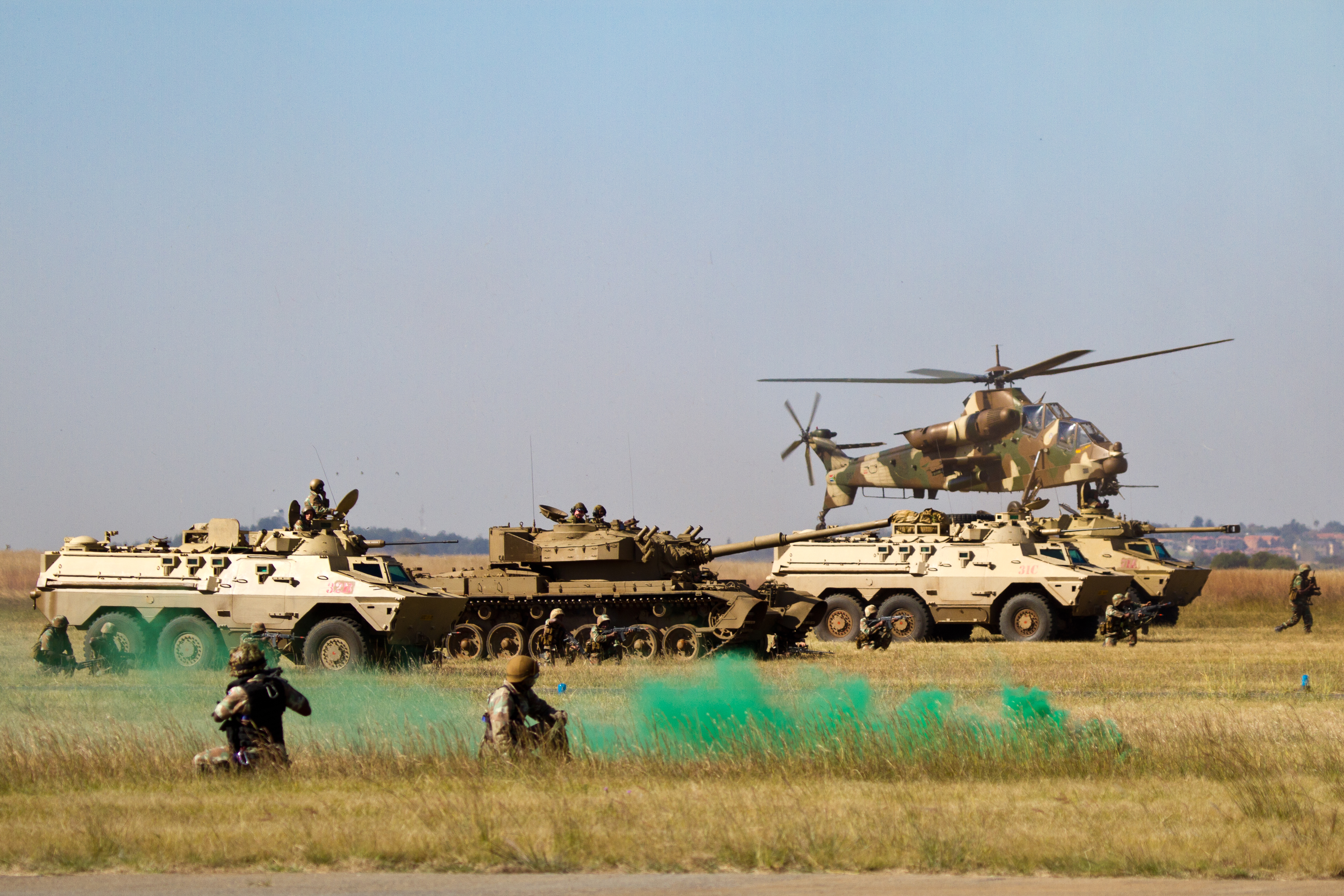
Army personnel conducting combined-arms manoeuvres during a military exercise.

The South African Army is the ground forces branch of the SANDF, responsible for national defence, landward operations, border safeguarding, regional peacekeeping missions, disaster relief, and support to civil authorities. It consists of around 40,000 active personnel and more than 12,000 reservists, making it the SANDF's largest branch. The service is headed by the Chief of the South African Army and is organised into several combat, combat support, and service support formations, including:

- Infantry Formation (mechanised, motorised, airborne, and light infantry units);
- Armour Formation (tank and armoured reconnaissance units);
- Artillery Formation (field artillery and fire support units);
- Air Defence Artillery Formation (ground-based air defence systems);
- Engineer Formation (combat engineering and infrastructure support);
- Intelligence Formation (military intelligence and battlefield surveillance);
- Support Formation (logistics, maintenance, and combat service support).

The South African Army operates a wide range of military equipment, including main battle tanks, infantry fighting vehicles (IFVs), mine-resistant ambush protected (MRAP) vehicles, and armoured personnel carriers (APCs), alongside artillery systems, air-defence systems, engineering equipment, and logistical support vehicles.

Rooikat combat recon vehicle of 1 Special Service Battalion

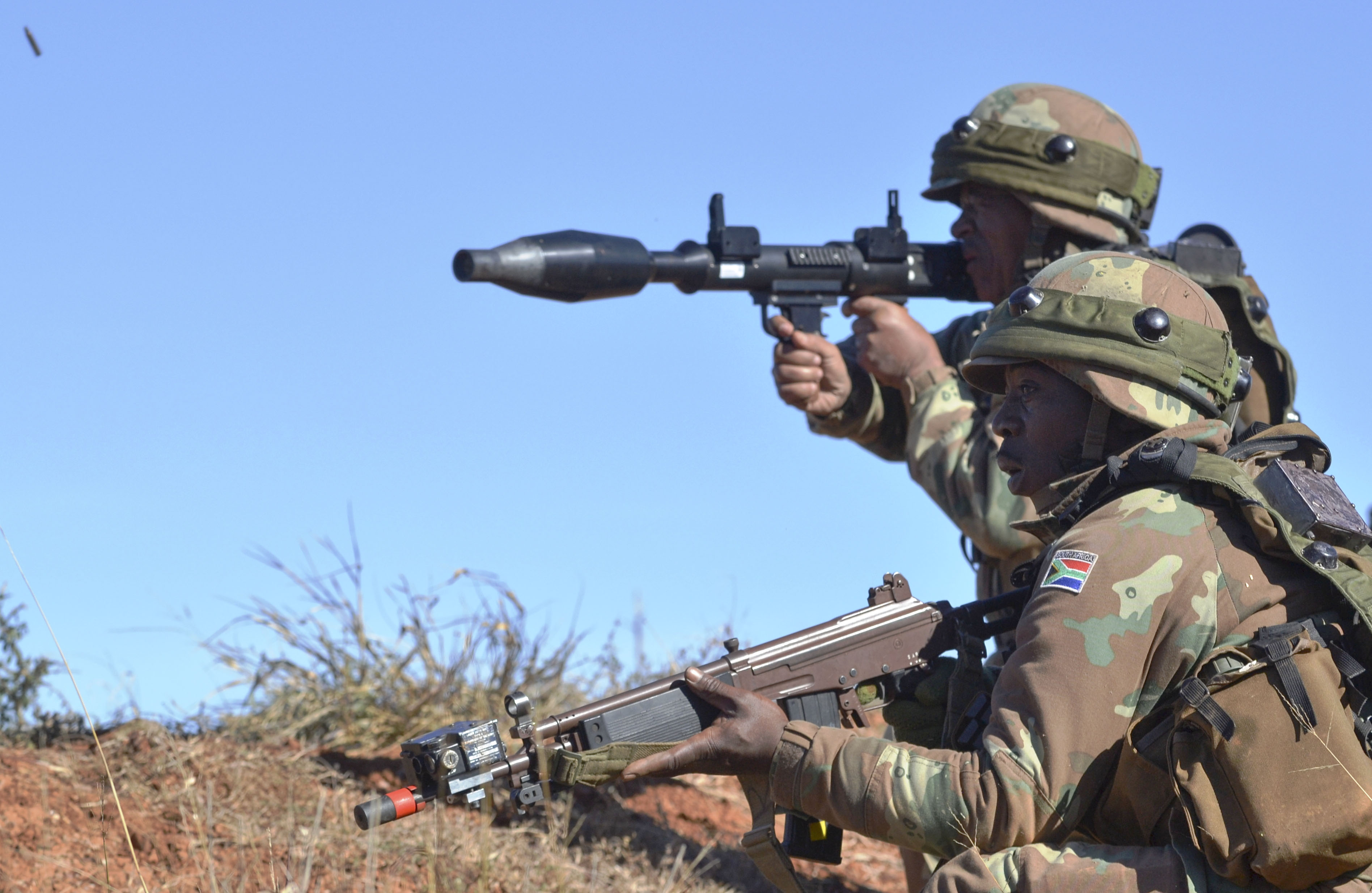
Light infantry during a U.S.-SA joint military exercise

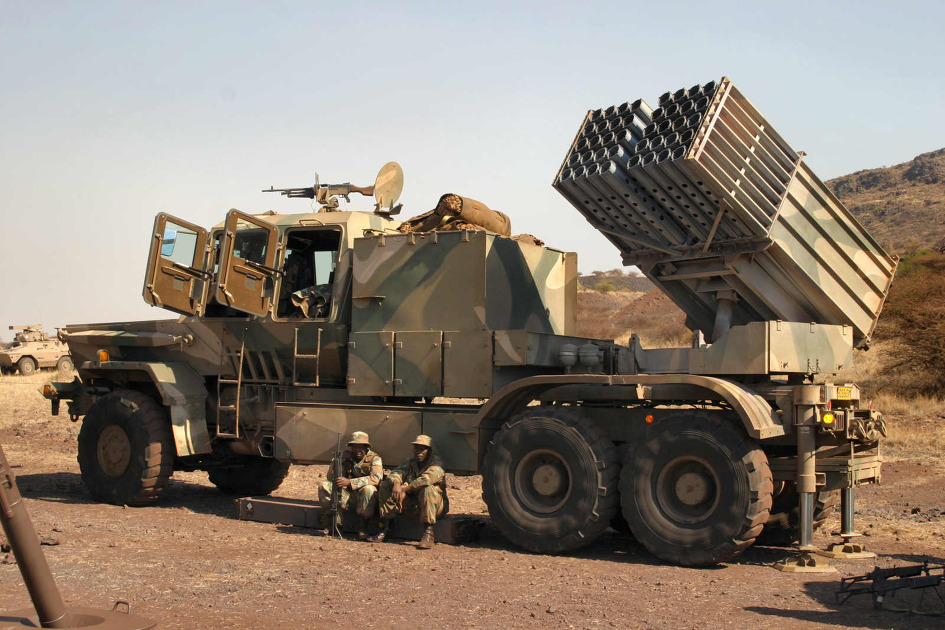
Bateleur FV2 mobile rocket artillery launch system

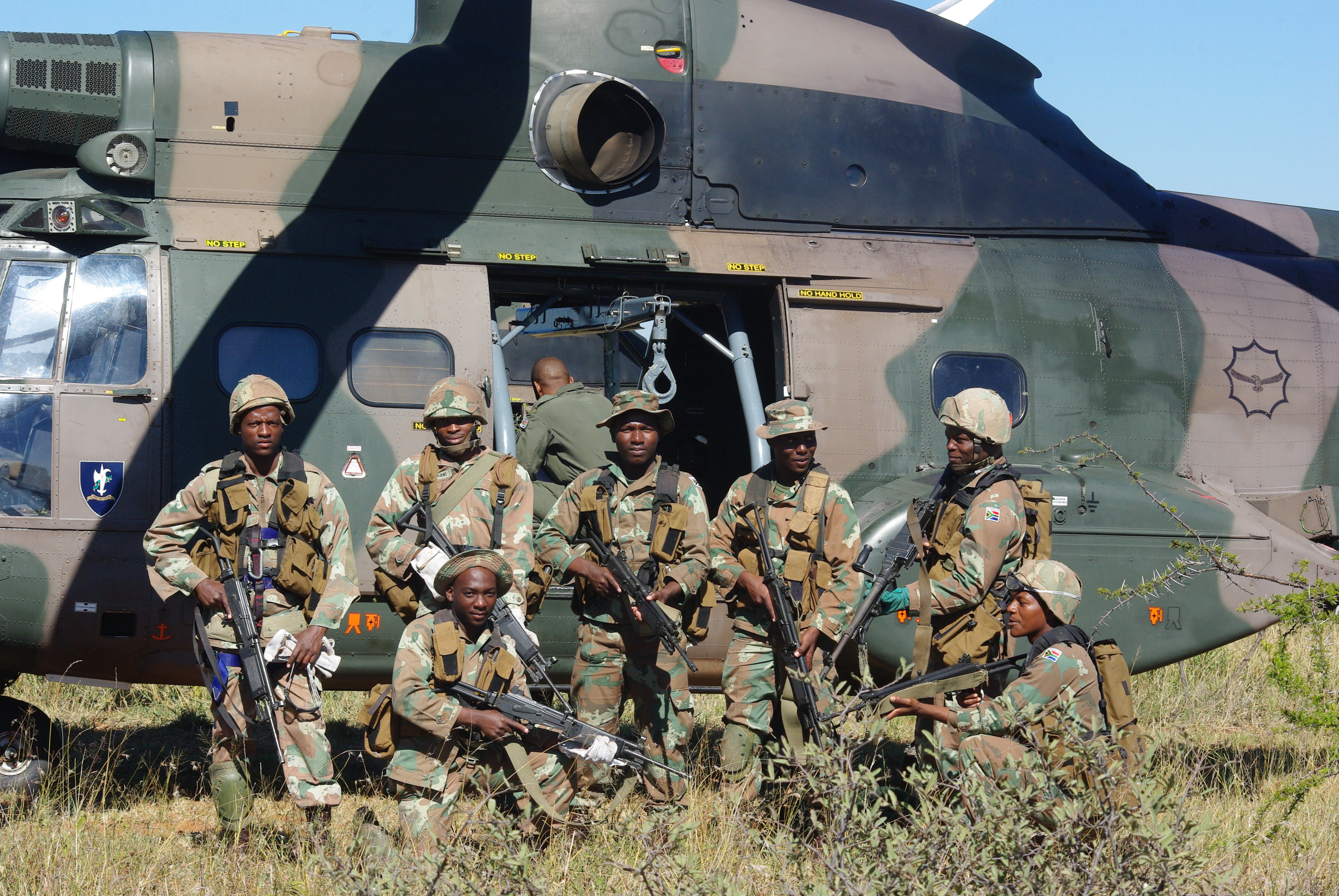
Soldiers of the army's dedicated air assault infantry unit

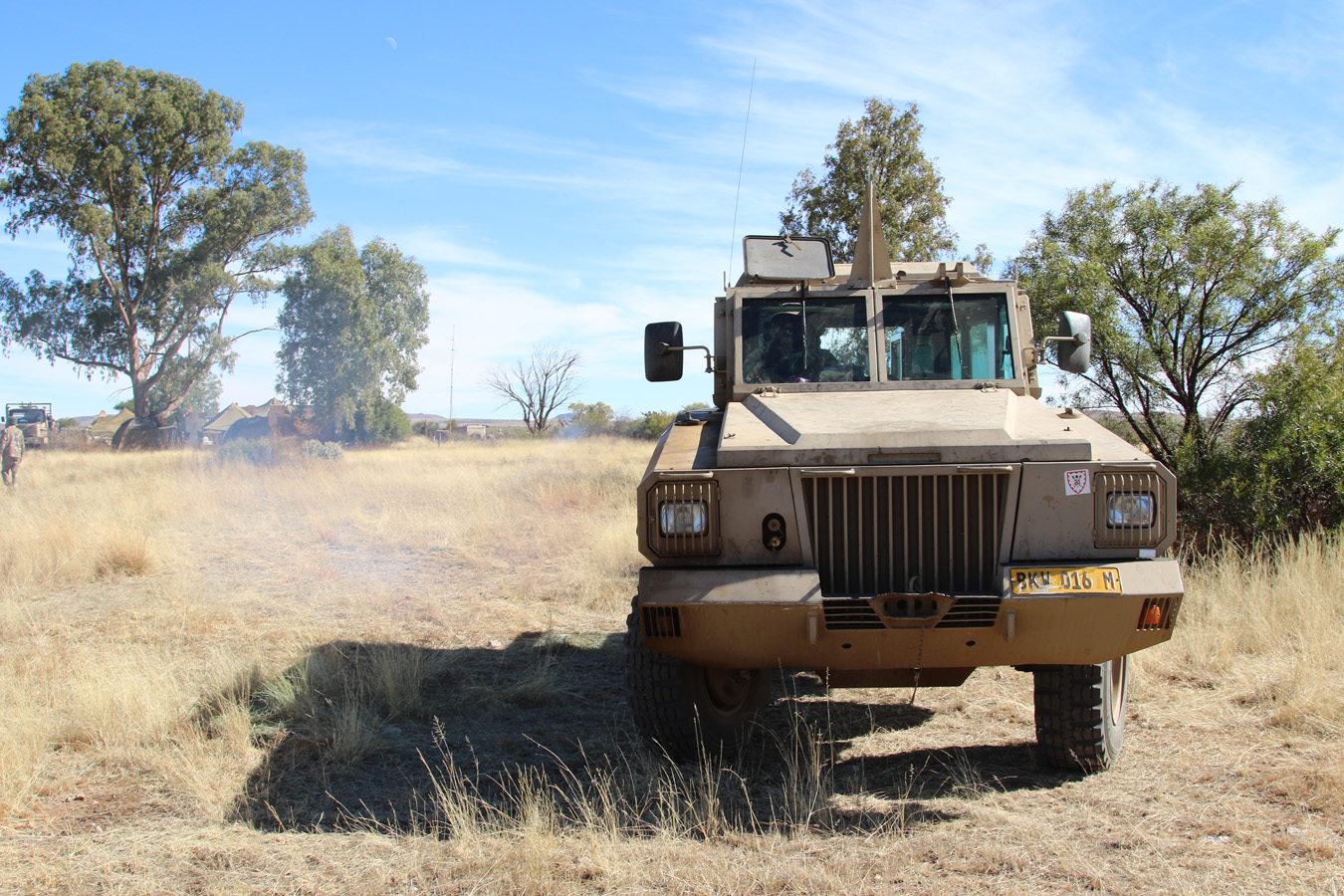
Mamba APC used by motorised infantry

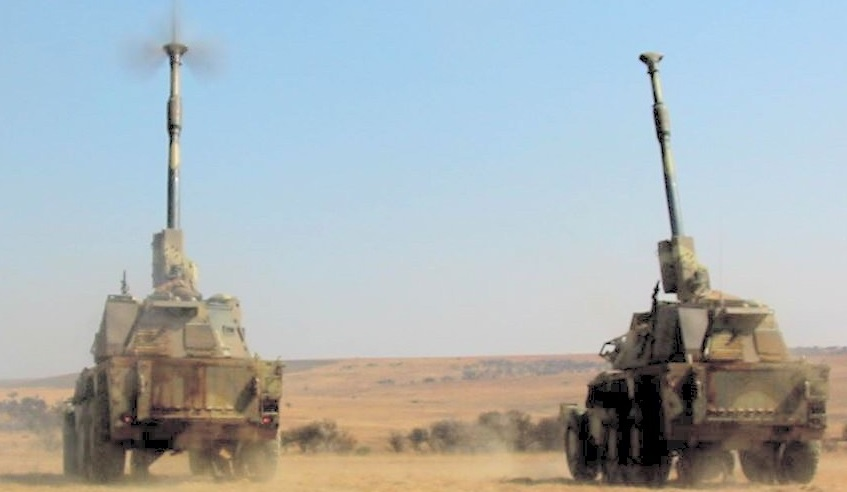
G6 Rhino self-propelled howitzers of the Artillery Formation

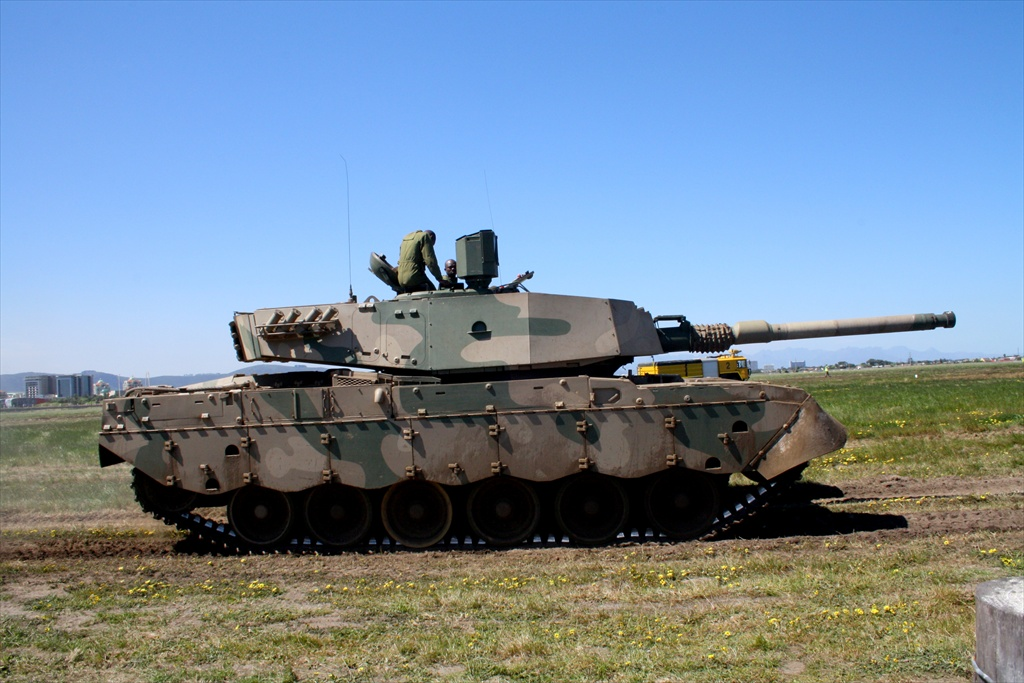
Olifant Mk2 main battle tank of the Armour Formation

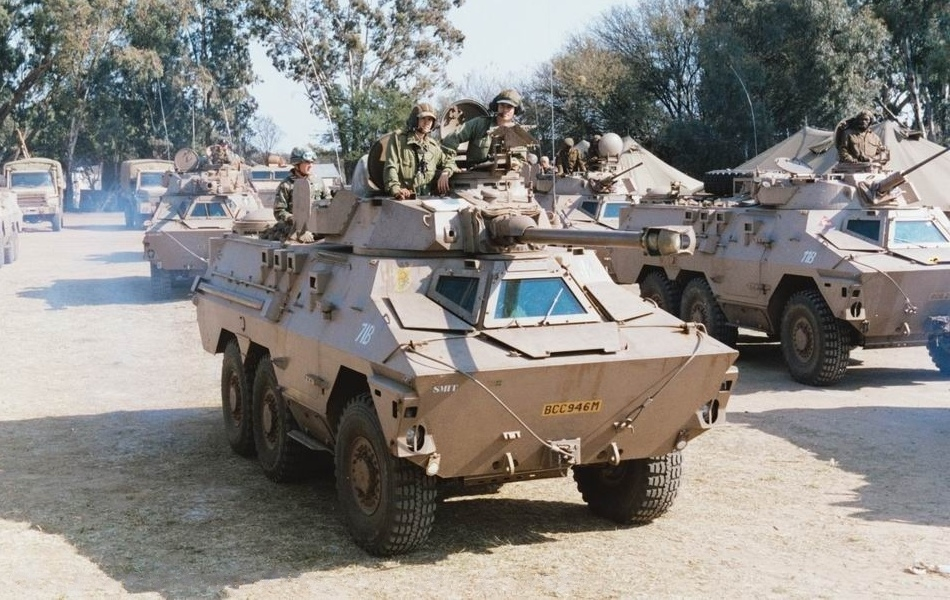
Mechanised infantry with Ratel IFVs

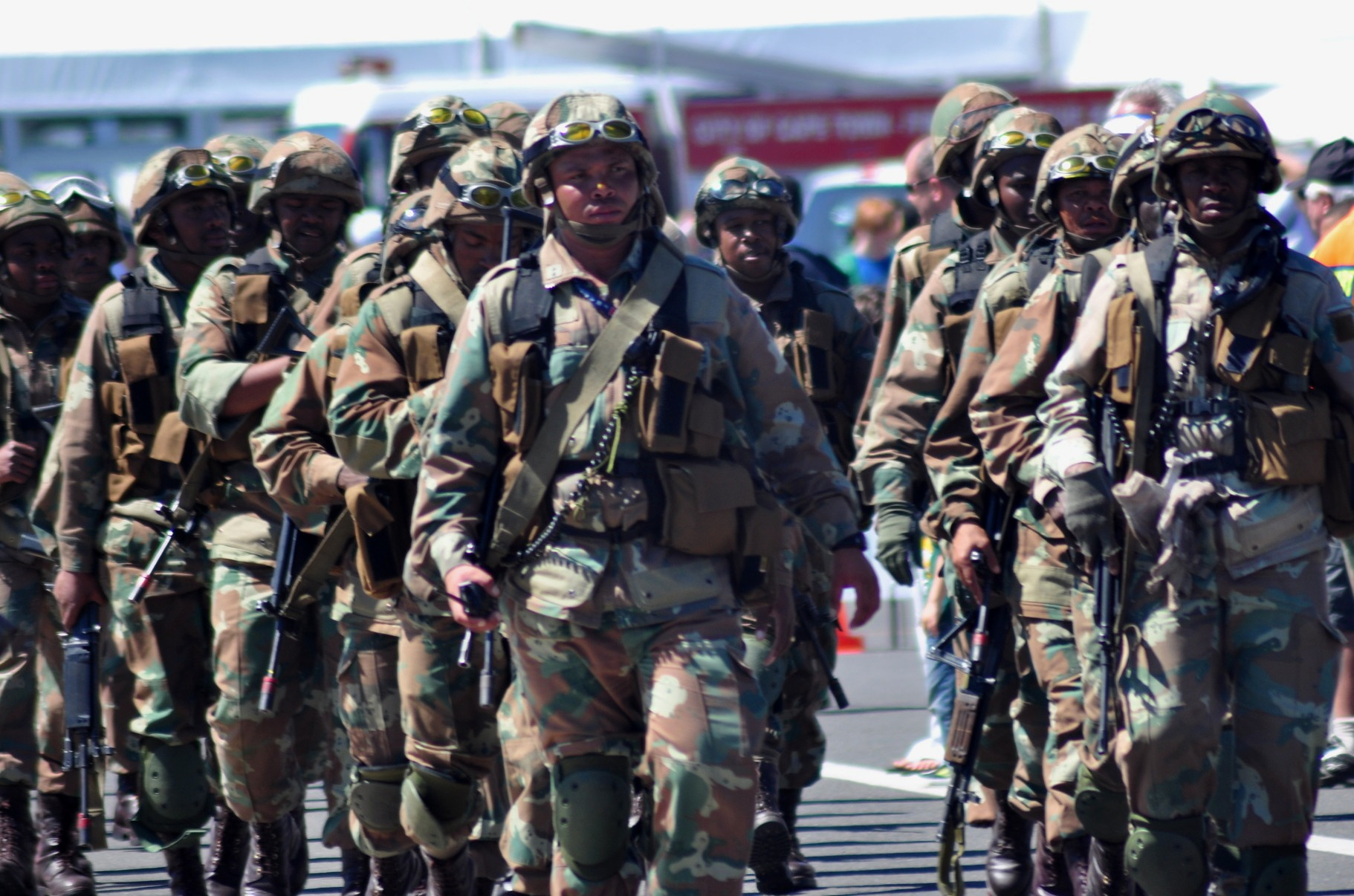
Paratroops of the 44th Parachute Regiment

=== South African Air Force ===
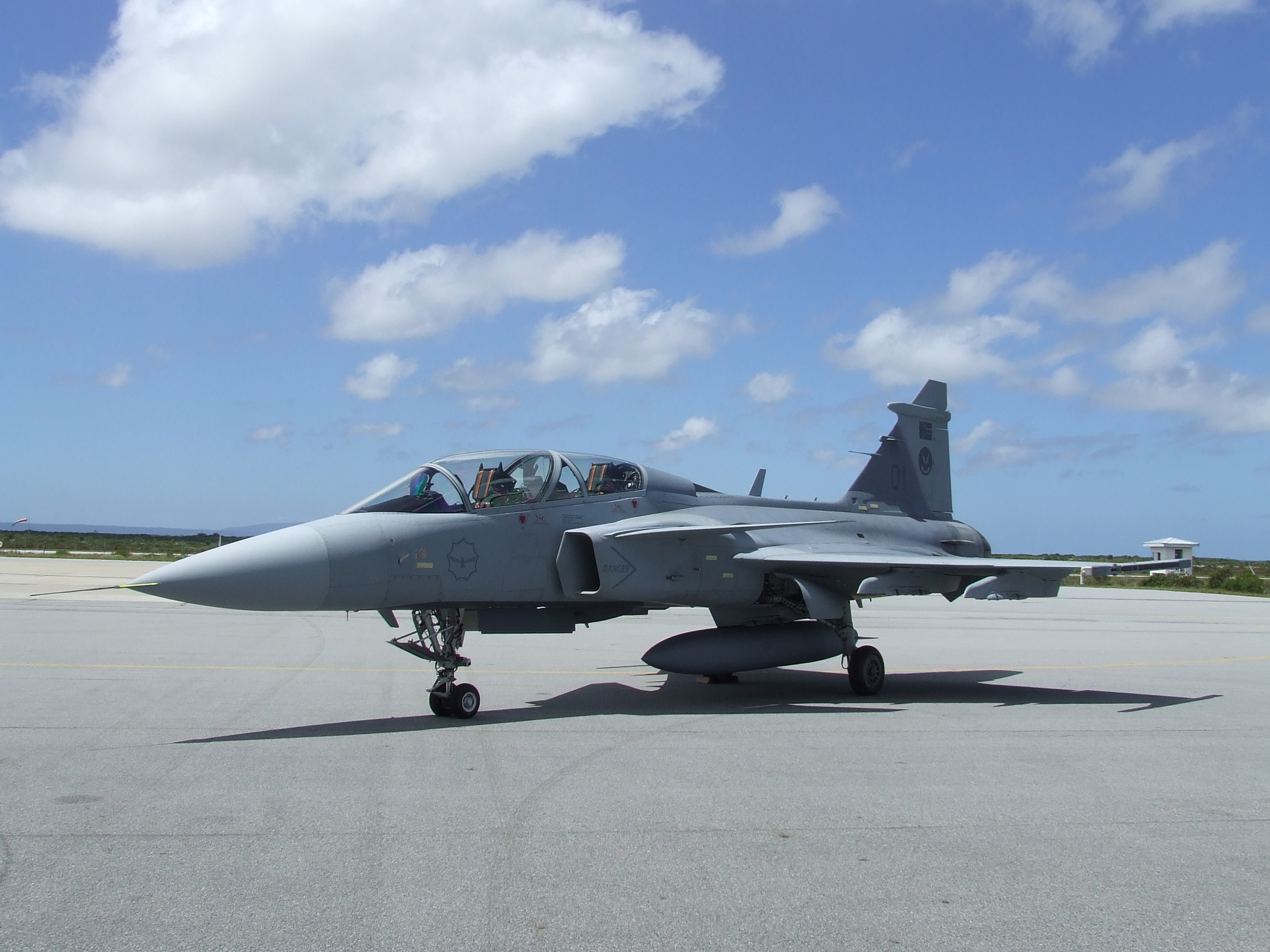
A South African Air Force JAS 39 Gripen multirole fighter at Air Force Base Overberg in the Western Cape, forming the core of South Africa's primary fighter capability.

The South African Air Force (Afrikaans: Suid-Afrikaanse Lugmag, abbreviated SAAF) is the aerial warfare branch of the SANDF, tasked with securing national airspace, supporting land and naval operations, and providing airlift, reconnaissance, and humanitarian assistance. Established in 1920, it is the second-oldest independent air force in the world after the British Royal Air Force. Commanded by the Chief of the SAAF, the service comprises around 12,800 active personnel and a reserve of just over 1,000, operating from nine official air force bases and several other air force stations. The principal air force bases are:

- AFB Waterkloof (Airlift Command and strategic transport hub);
- AFB Makhado (Northern fighter base, home to the Gripen and Hawk fleet);
- AFB Ysterplaat (Naval operations, maritime patrol, and helicopter units);
- AFB Swartkop (Mobile Deployment Wing, museum, and the oldest air force base);
- AFB Bloemspruit (Helicopter operations, home to the Rooivalk attack helicopter);
- AFB Hoedspruit (Reconnaissance and helicopter operations in the northeast);
- AFB Langebaanweg (Primary flight training school for pilots);
- AFB Overberg (Test flight and development centre);
- AFB Durban (Search and rescue and maritime helicopter operations);

Today the SAAF operates a fleet of around 200 aircraft, these include fighter aircraft, transport aircraft, helicopters, maritime patrol aircraft, training aircraft, and VIP aircraft. Historically, the SAAF was one of the largest and most capable air forces in the Southern Hemisphere, operating several hundred aircraft during the Cold War. Since the early 1990s, following the end of the conflict and subsequent reductions in defence spending, the service has undergone extensive restructuring, resulting in the retirement of more than 400 aircraft and the disbandment of several squadrons, air force stations, and operational bases.

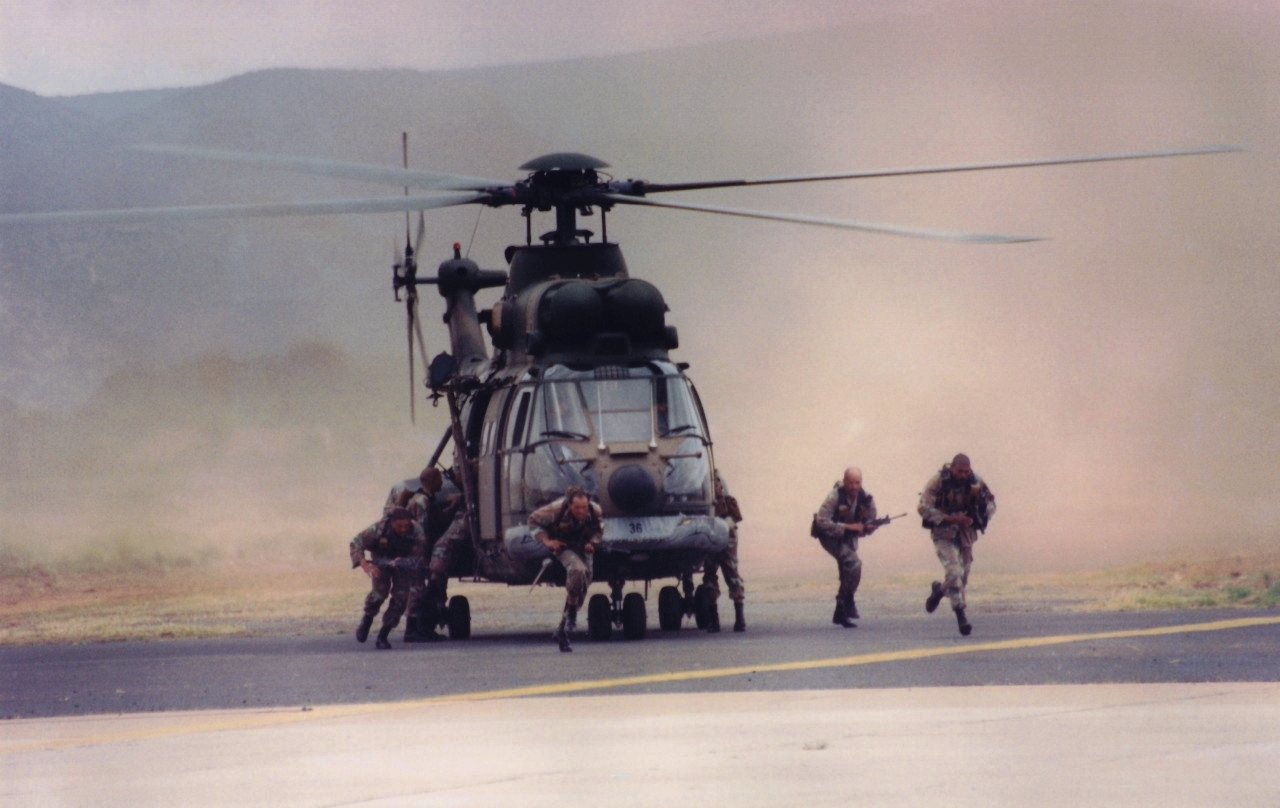
Oryx medium helicopter deploying infantry

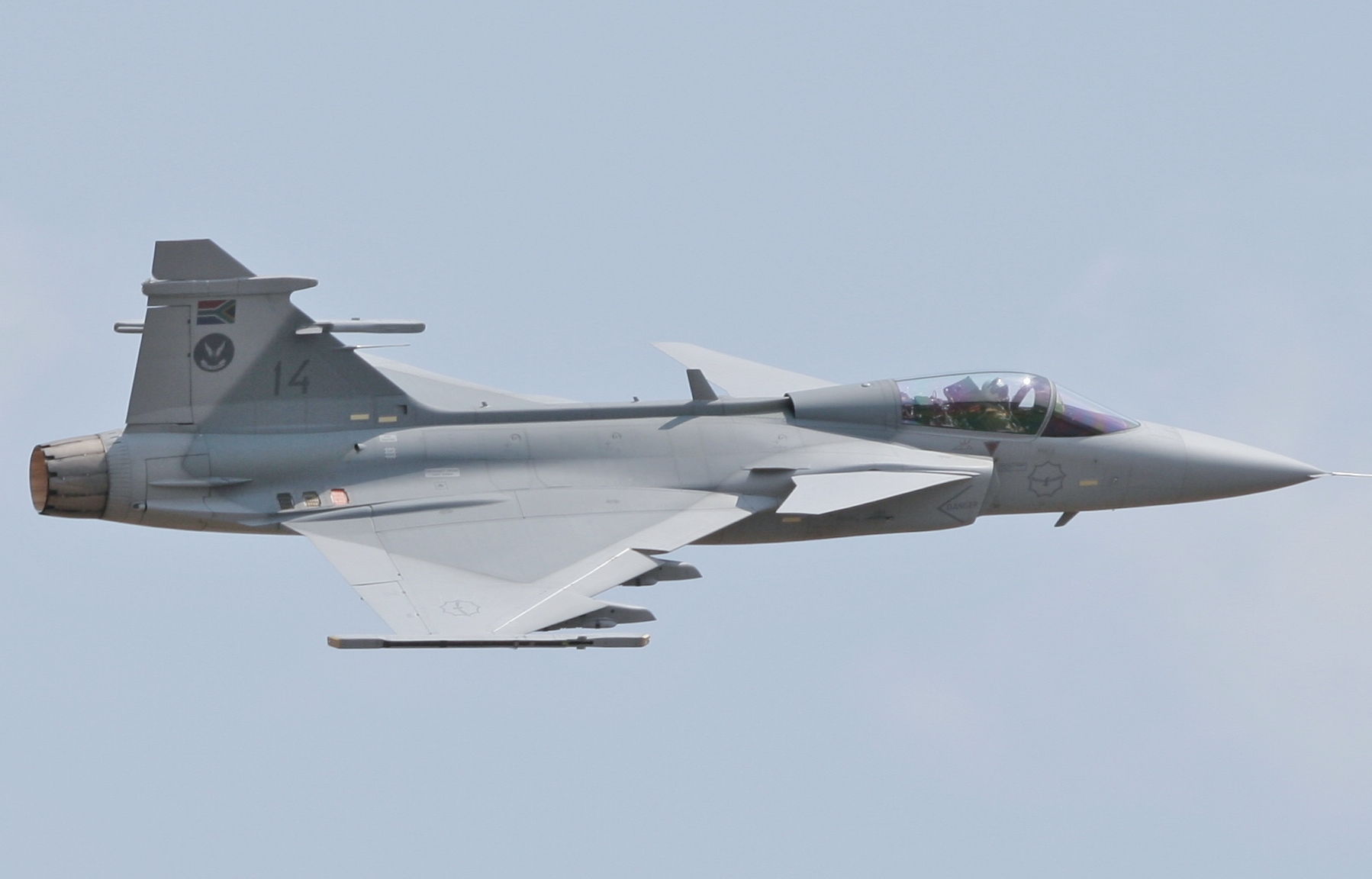
Gripen C multirole fighter aircraft

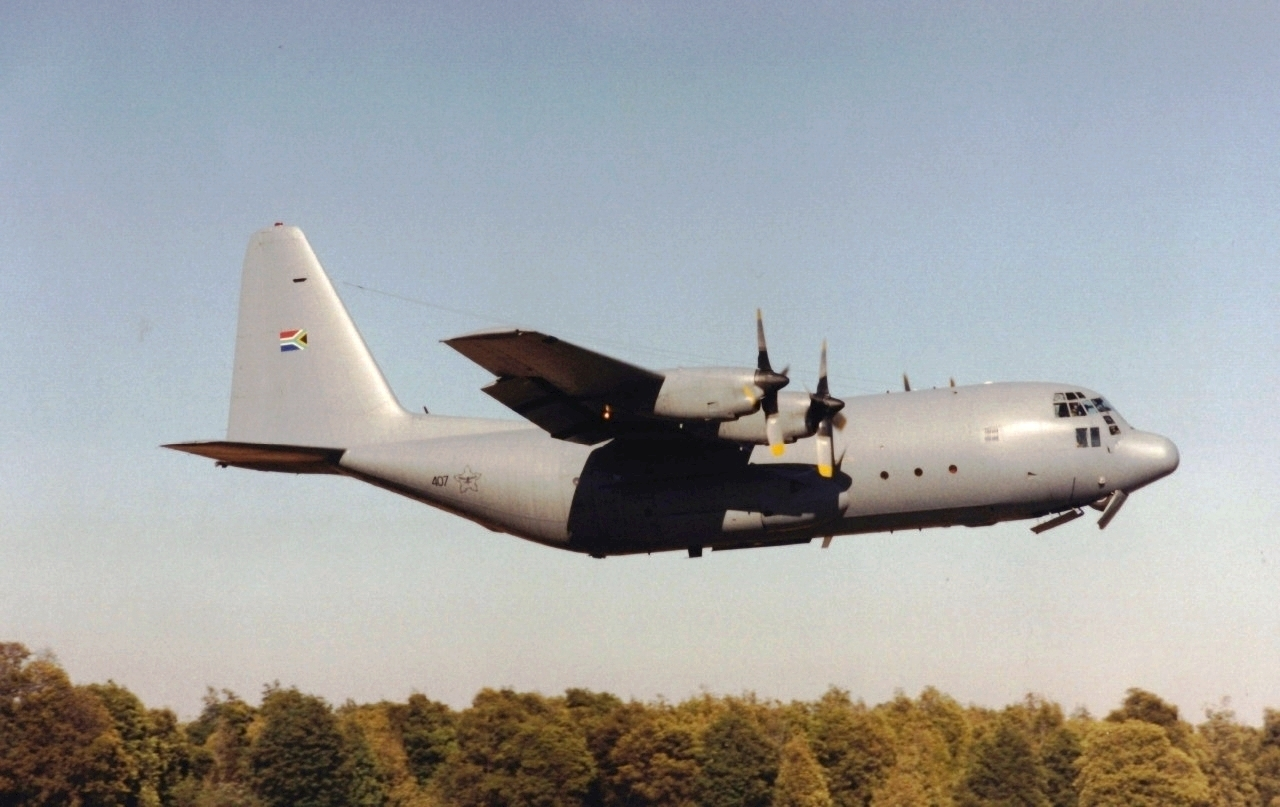
C-130BZ Hercules tactical airlifter

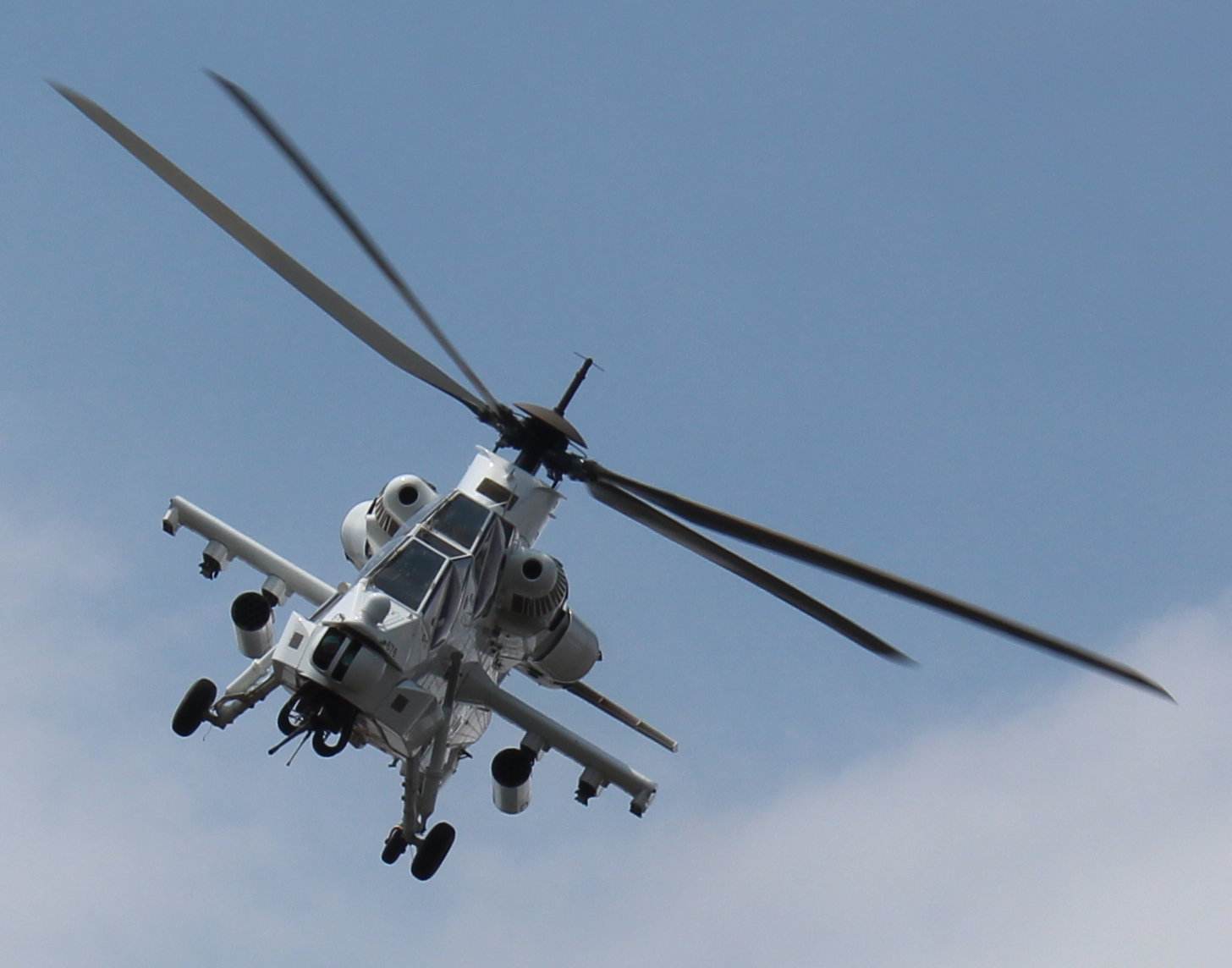
SAAF MONUSCO Rooivalk in the DRC

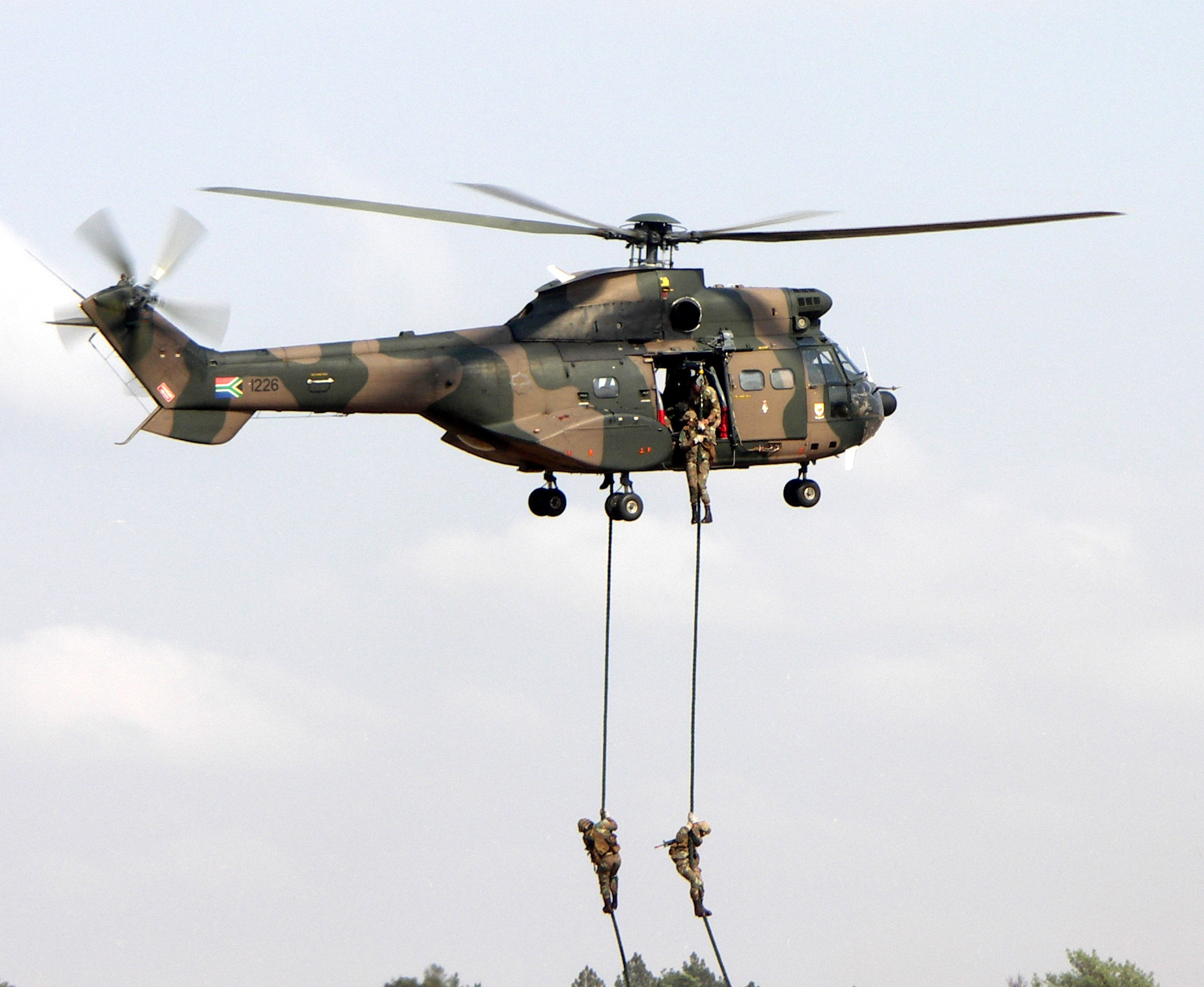
Fast-roping from an Oryx

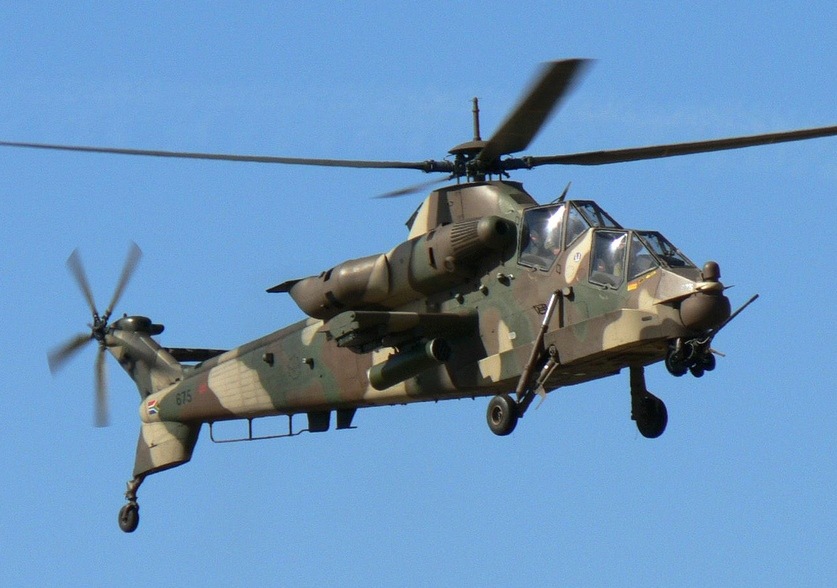
The Rooivalk in its standard camouflage scheme

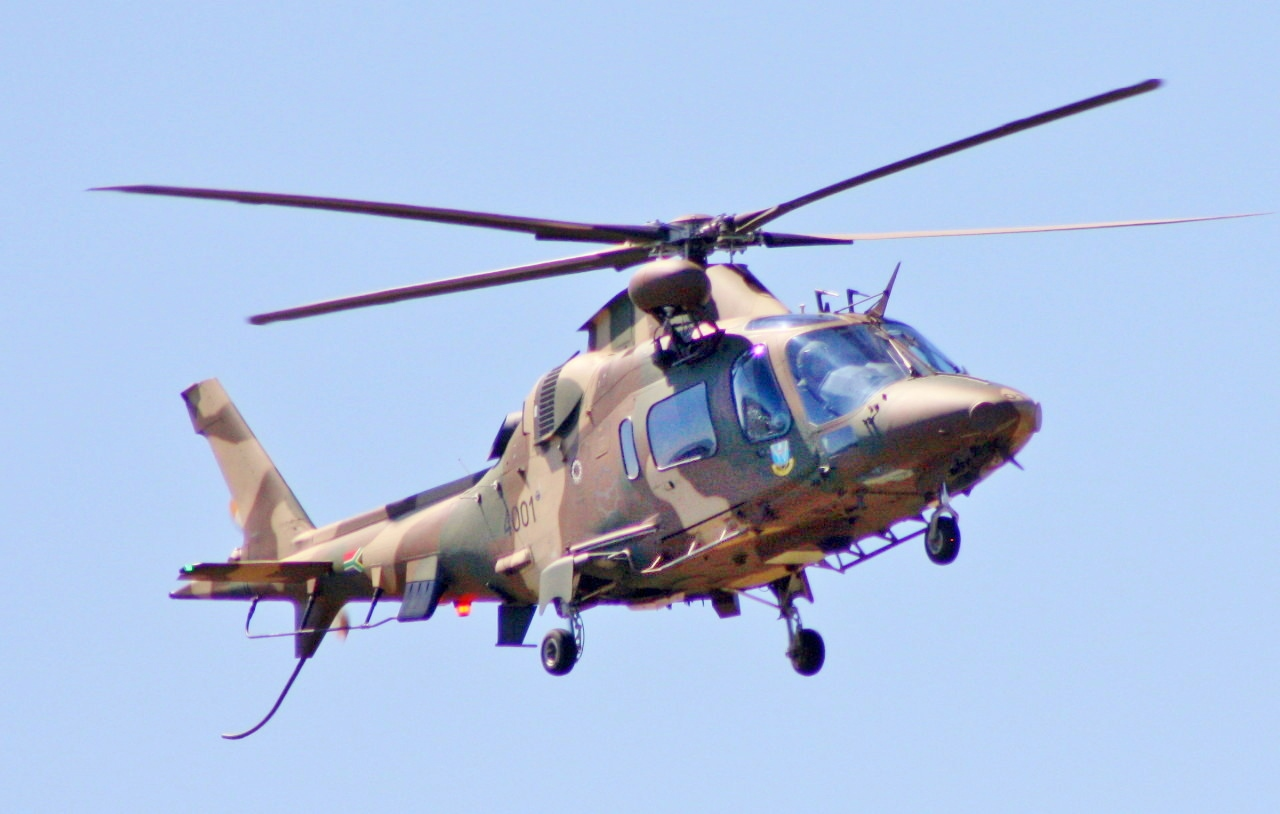
A109 light utility helicopter in flight

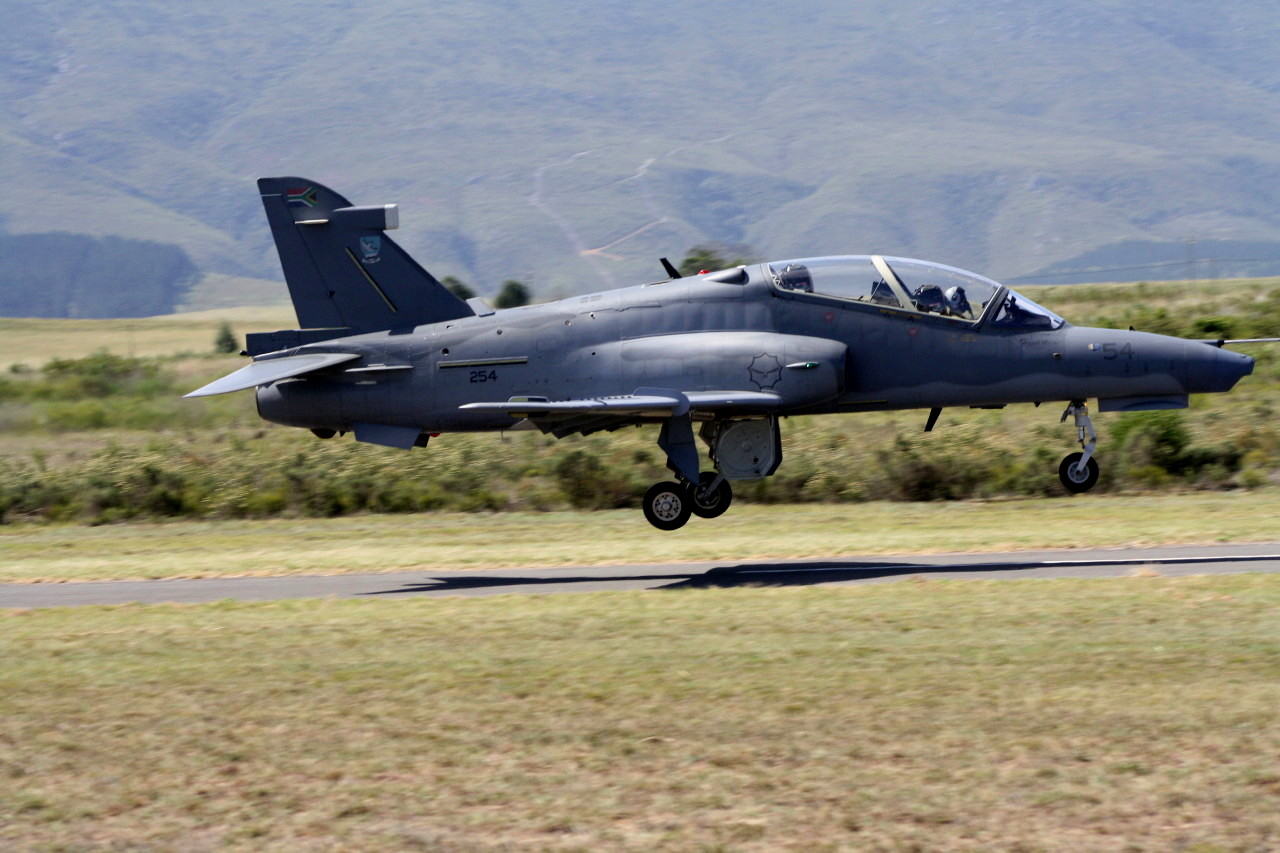
Hawk 120 lead-in fighter trainer

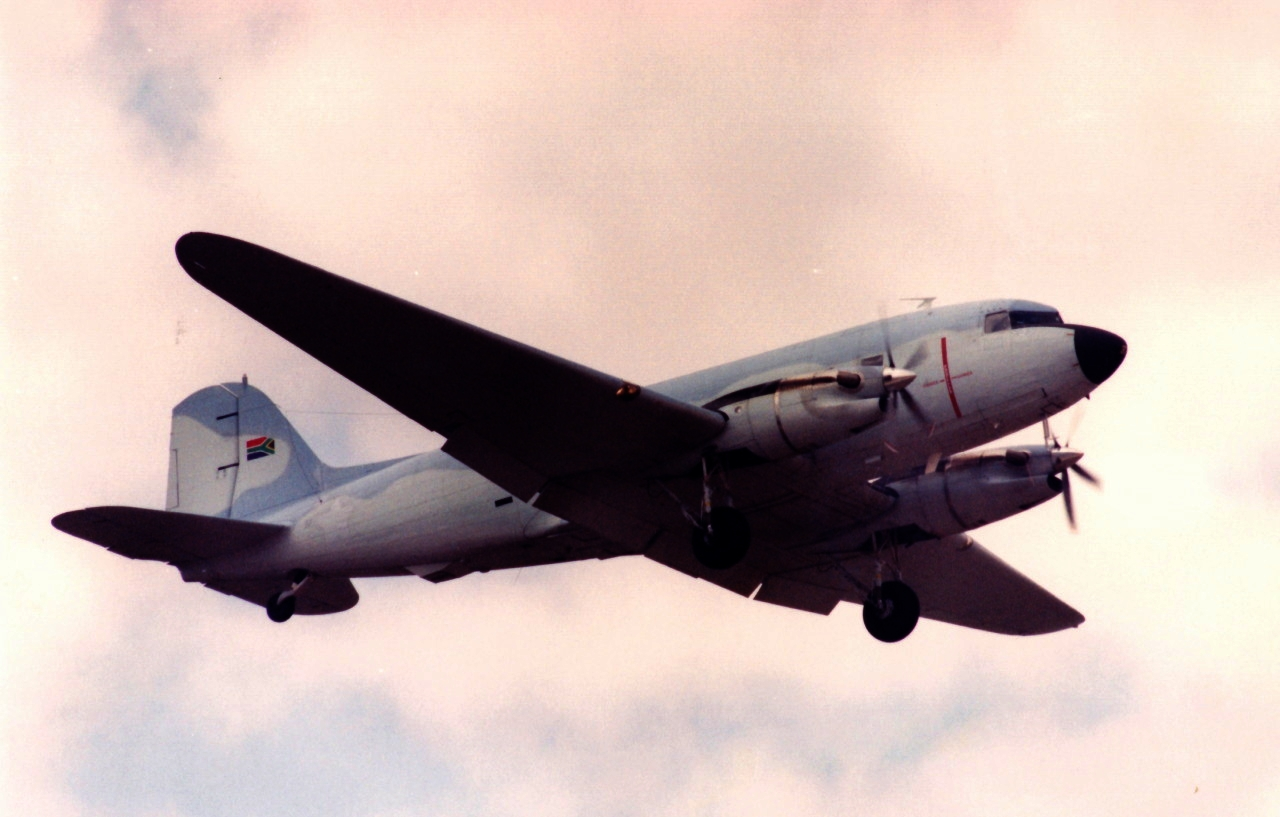
C-47TP Turbo Dakota maritime patrol

=== South African Navy ===
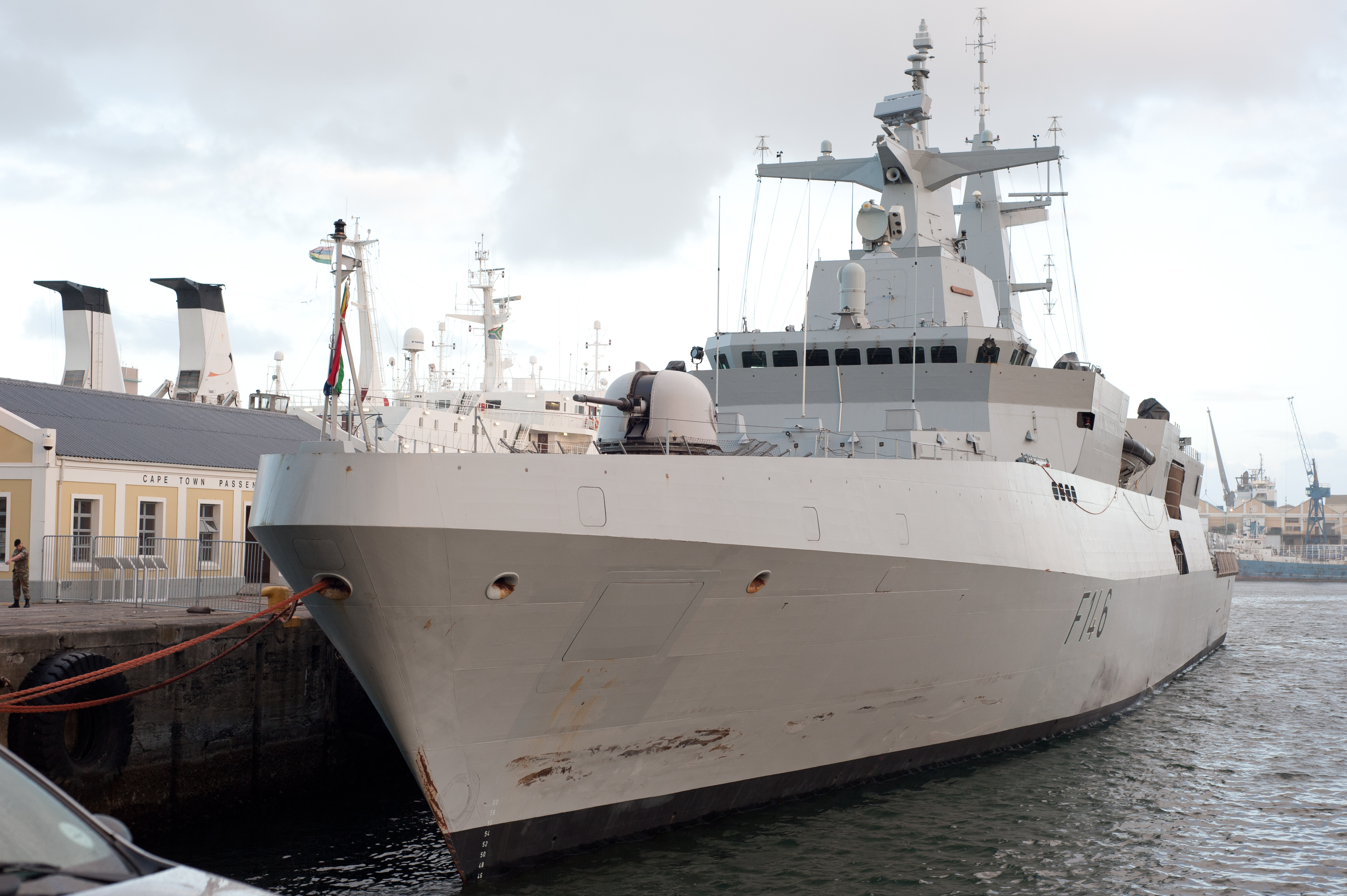
The SAS Isandlwana (F146), one of four Valour-class stealth guided-missile frigates. The class serves as the primary surface combatant of the South African Navy and is equipped for anti-surface, anti-air and anti-submarine warfare.

The South African Navy (SA Navy) is the naval warfare branch of the SANDF, responsible for defending South Africa's territorial waters, safeguarding maritime trade routes, supporting joint military operations, and contributing to regional maritime security and peacekeeping missions. The Navy consists of approximately 7,000 active personnel and several hundred reservists, it is headed by the Chief of the SA Navy. The principal naval bases and training establishments are:

- Naval Base Simon's Town (headquarters of the South African Navy, located in Cape Town, and homeport of the frigate and submarine flotillas);
- Naval Base Durban (home to the patrol flotillas and the Navy's principal base on the east coast);
- Naval Station Port Elizabeth (fleet support facility and host to visiting naval vessels);
- SAS Saldanha (training and development establishment for ratings);
- SAS Wingfield (naval training establishment for ratings and officers);
- SAS Simonsberg (gunnery, anti-submarine warfare, communications, diving, seamanship, nuclear, biological and chemical defence, damage control, and specialist naval training);
- South African Naval College (officer training establishment located in Gordon's Bay).

The SA Navy operates a fleet of around 60 commissioned vessels. Its core combat capability is centred on four stealthy Valour-class guided-missile frigates and three Heroine-class attack submarines, these are also supported by a number of offshore patrol vessels, inshore patrol vessels, hydrographic survey ships, harbour craft, and auxiliary support vessels.

==== Maritime Reaction Squadron ====
The Maritime Reaction Squadron (MRS) is the Navy's amphibious infantry formation, established in 2006 to provide a rapidly deployable force for coastal security, maritime interdiction, amphibious operations, force protection, boarding actions, and expeditionary missions in support of peacekeeping, humanitarian assistance, and disaster relief operations. Organised around operational boat, infantry, and support elements, the squadron performs a role broadly comparable to that of a marine force. The MRS effectively succeeded many of the functions previously undertaken by the South African Marine Corps, which was disbanded in 1990 following defence restructuring and budget reductions.

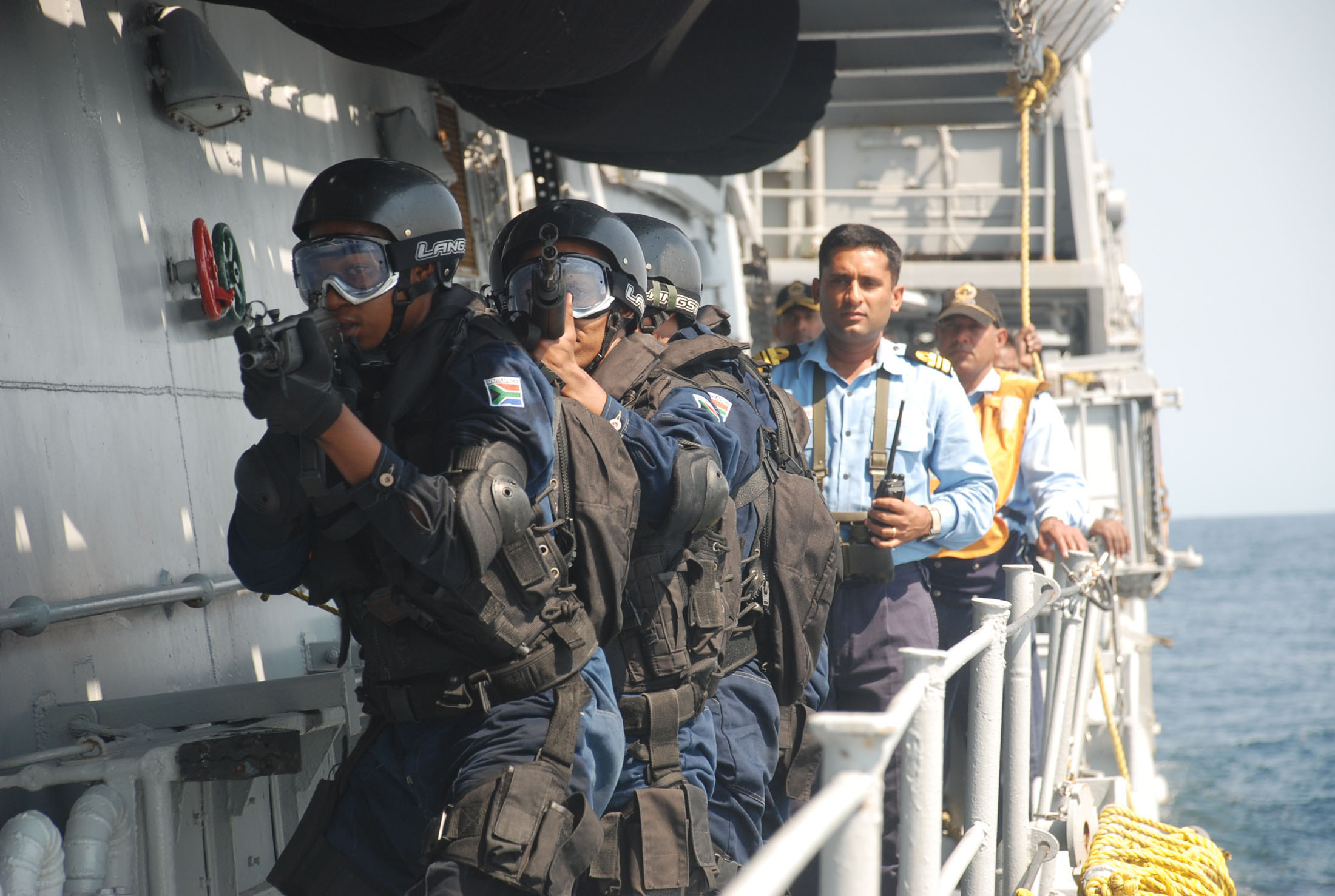
Marines of the Maritime Reaction Squadron during a naval exercise

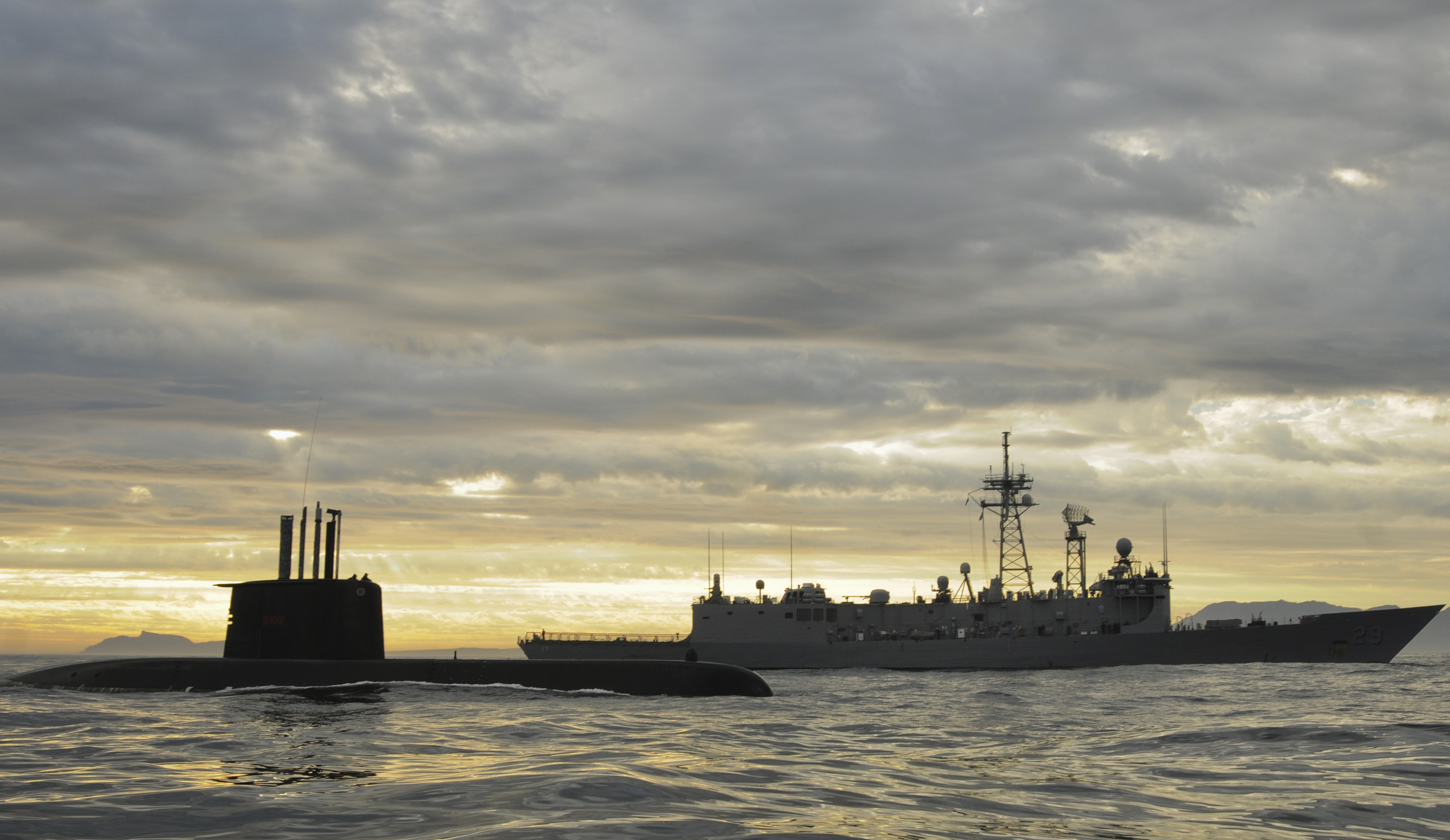
SAS Charlotte Maxeke (S102), a Heroine-class submarine, alongside a U.S. Navy frigate

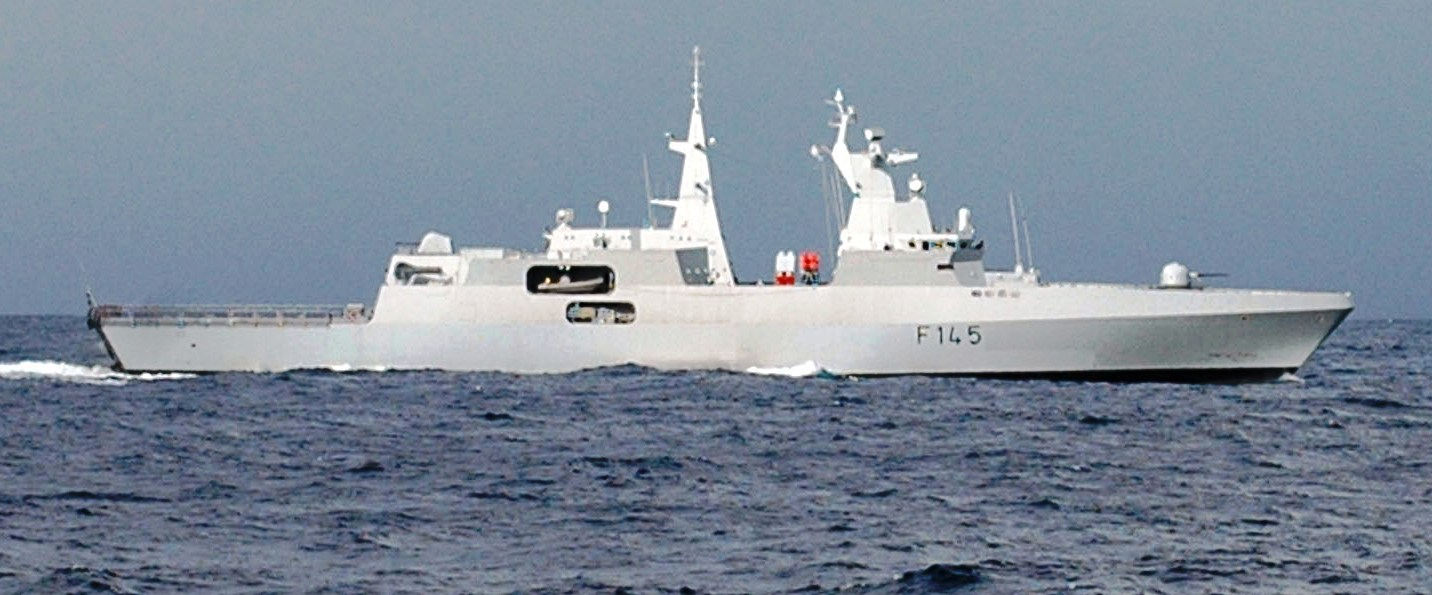
SAS Amatola (F145), lead ship of the Valour-class frigates, during exercises in the Indian Ocean

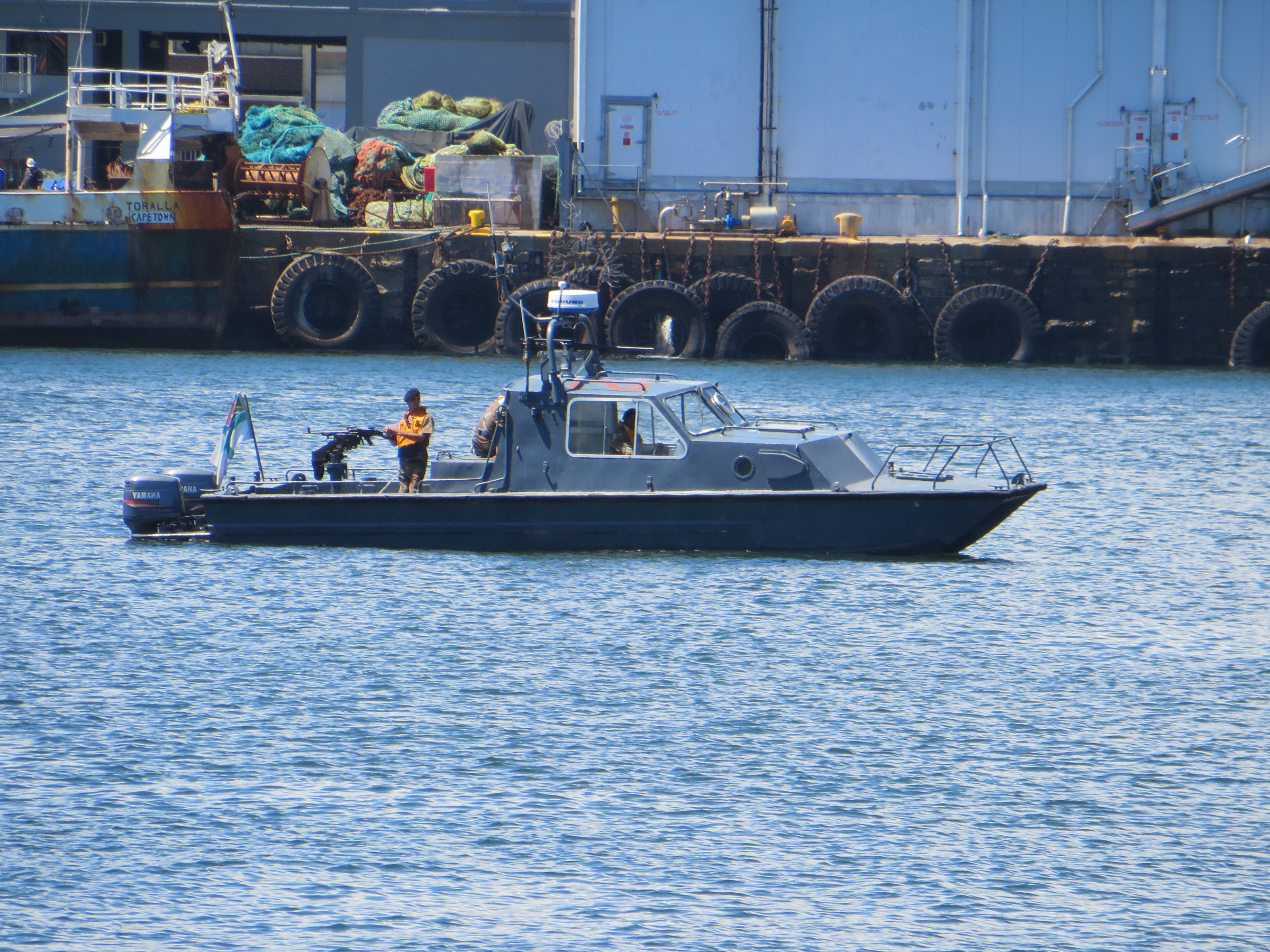
Namacurra-class harbour patrol craft

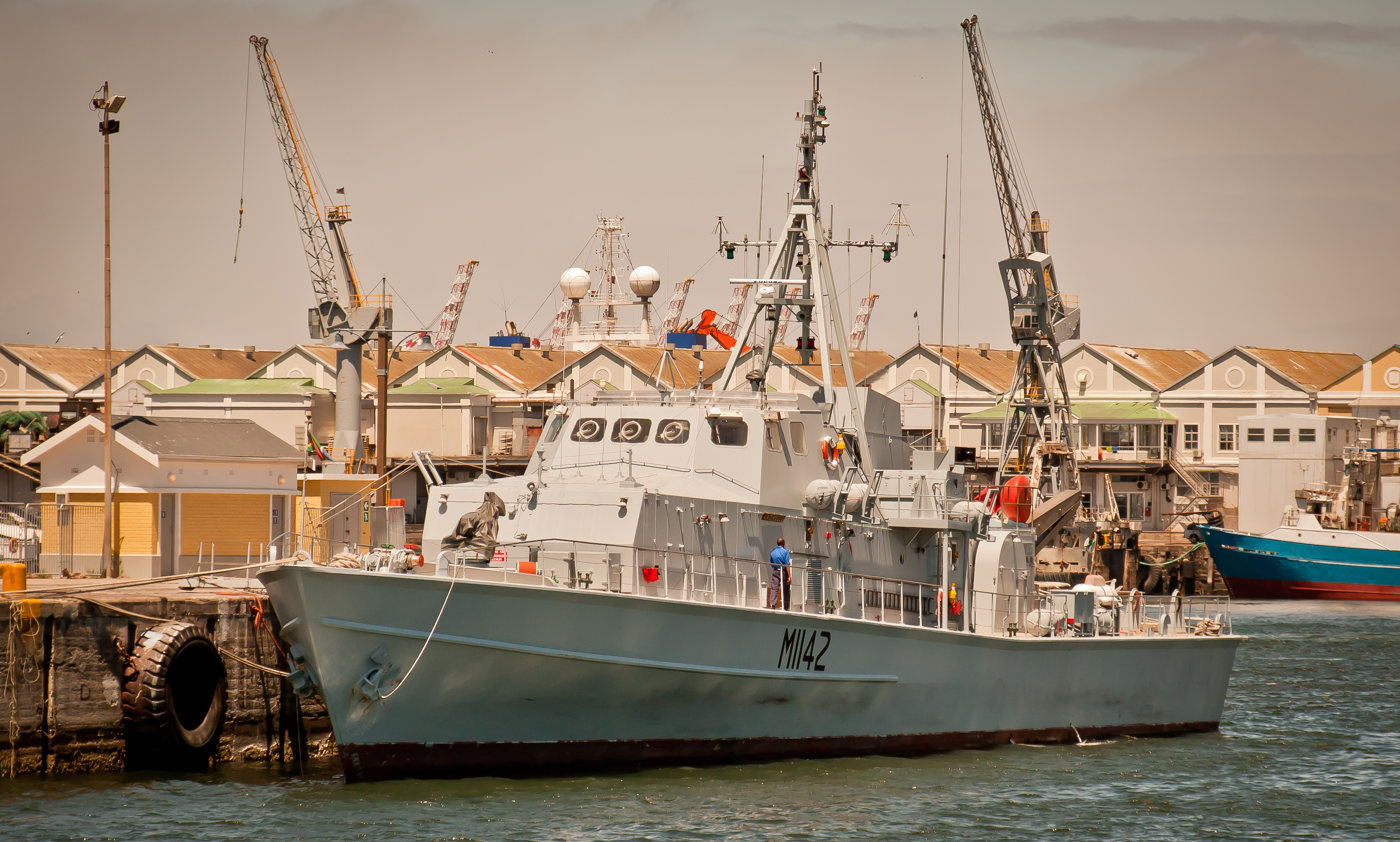
River-class minesweeper vessel SAS Umzimkulu (M1142)

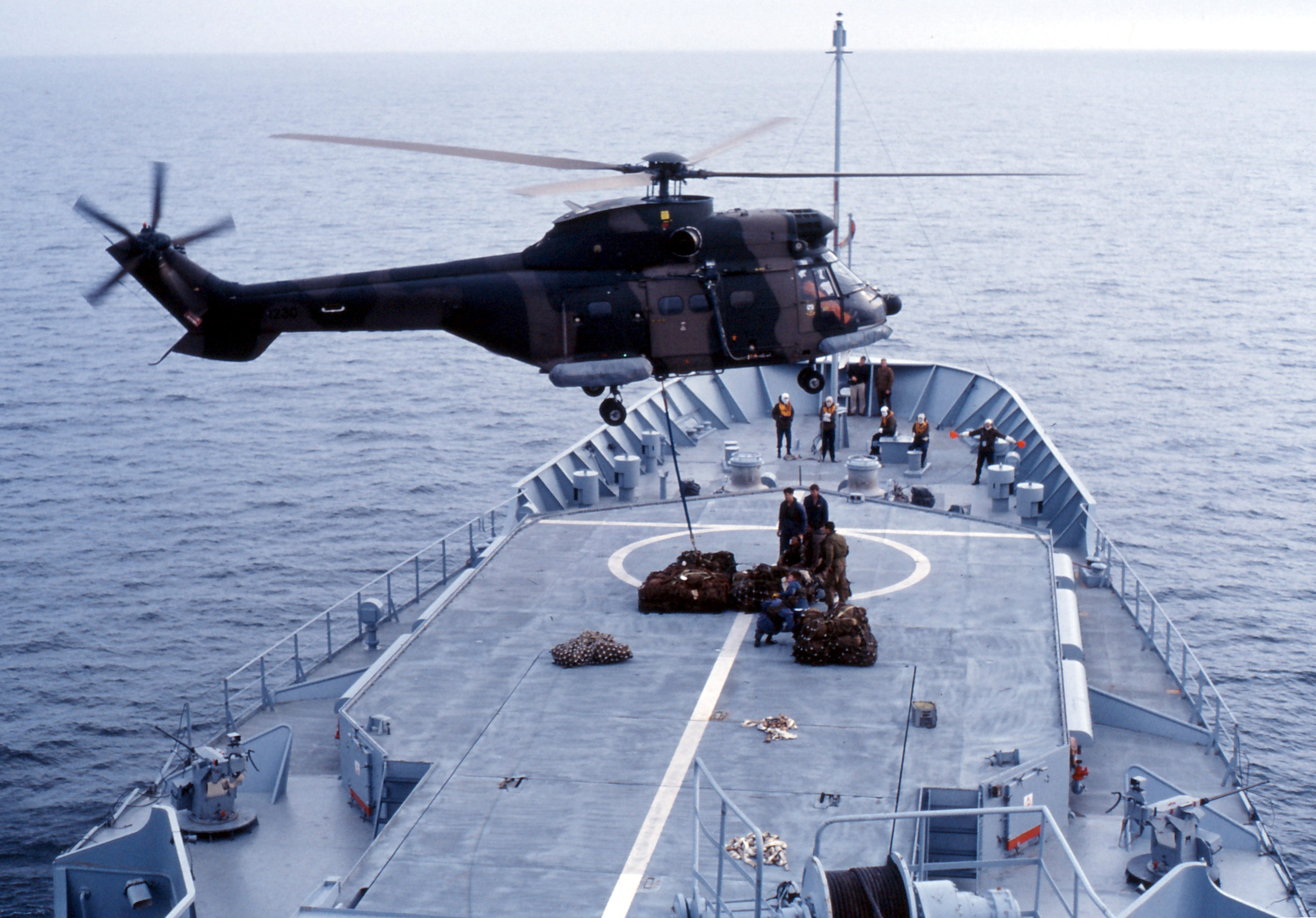
Oryx M2 cargo-slinging off the SAS Drakensberg (A301)

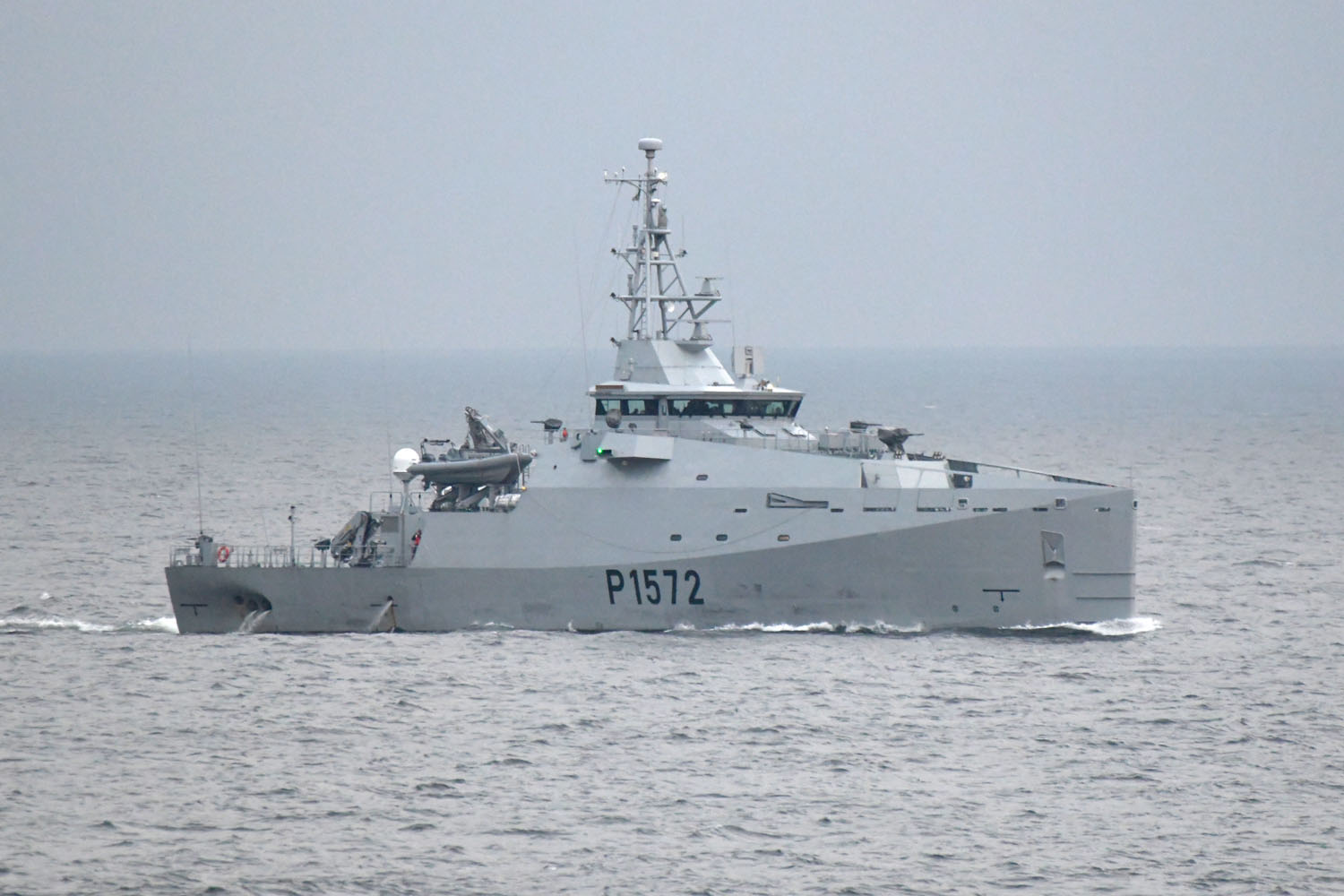
Warrior-class patrol vessel SAS King Shaka Zulu (P1572)

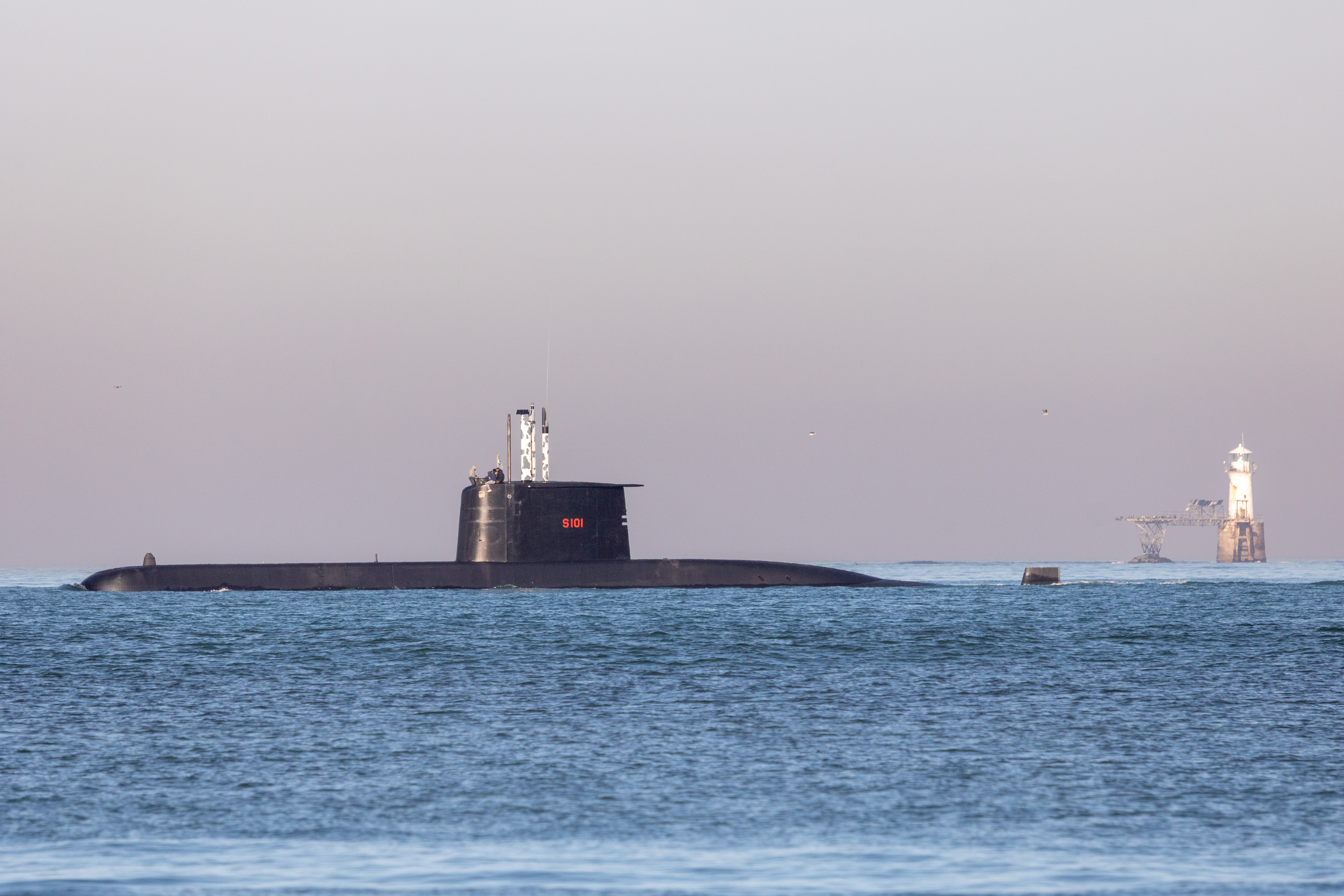
Heroine-class submarine SAS Manthatisi (S101)

=== South African Military Health Service ===
The South African Military Health Service (SAMHS) is the medical branch of the SANDF, responsible for providing healthcare, medical support, and operational medical services to military personnel and their dependants during peacetime, wartime, and deployments. The service is headed by the Surgeon General of the SAHMS and comprises around 10,000 active and reserve personnel. Through a network of military hospitals, medical units, and support facilities, the SAMHS provides preventative healthcare, trauma care, rehabilitation services, and medical support to the Army, Air Force, and Navy.

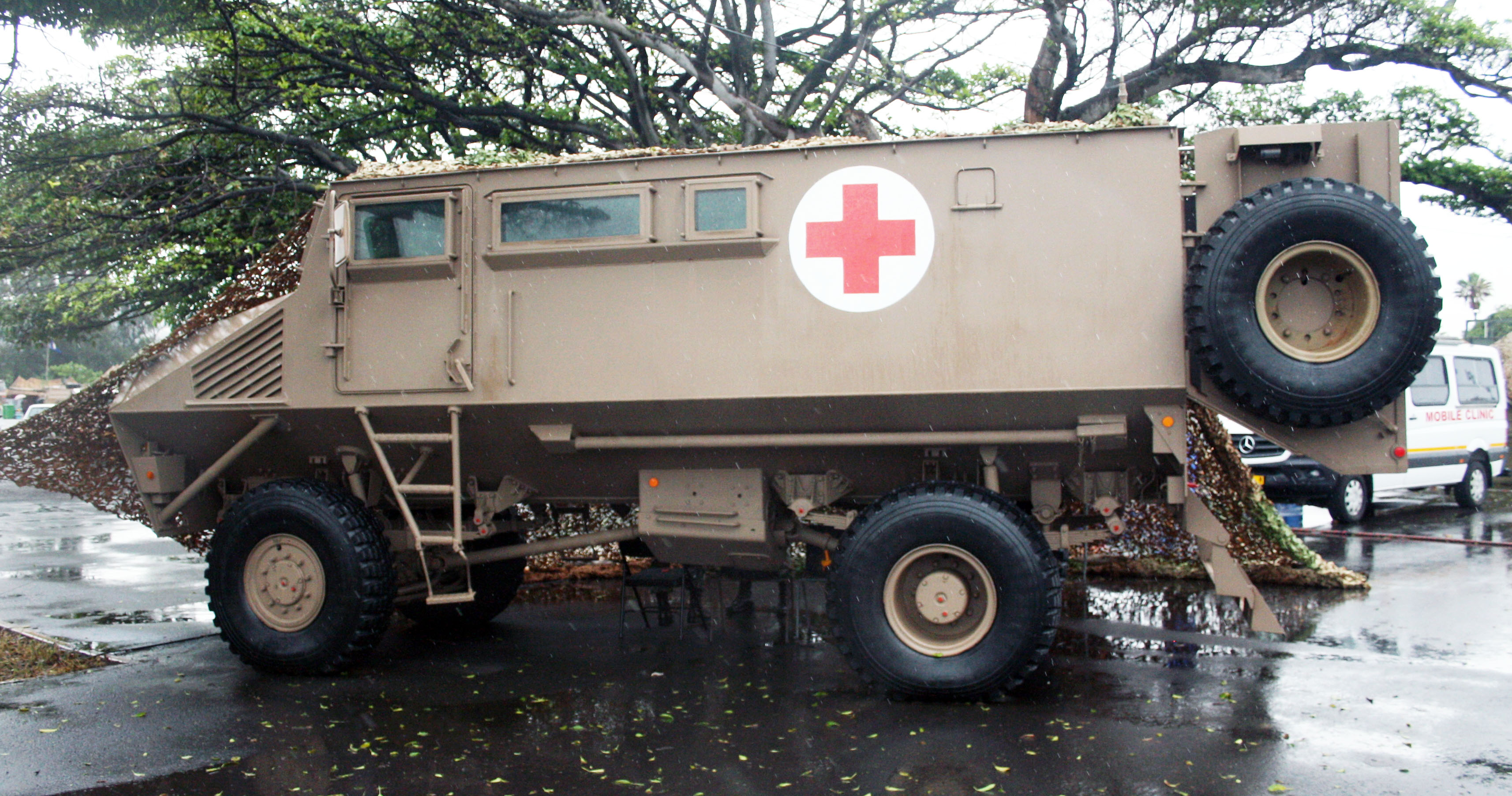
SAMHS Mfezi armoured amublance

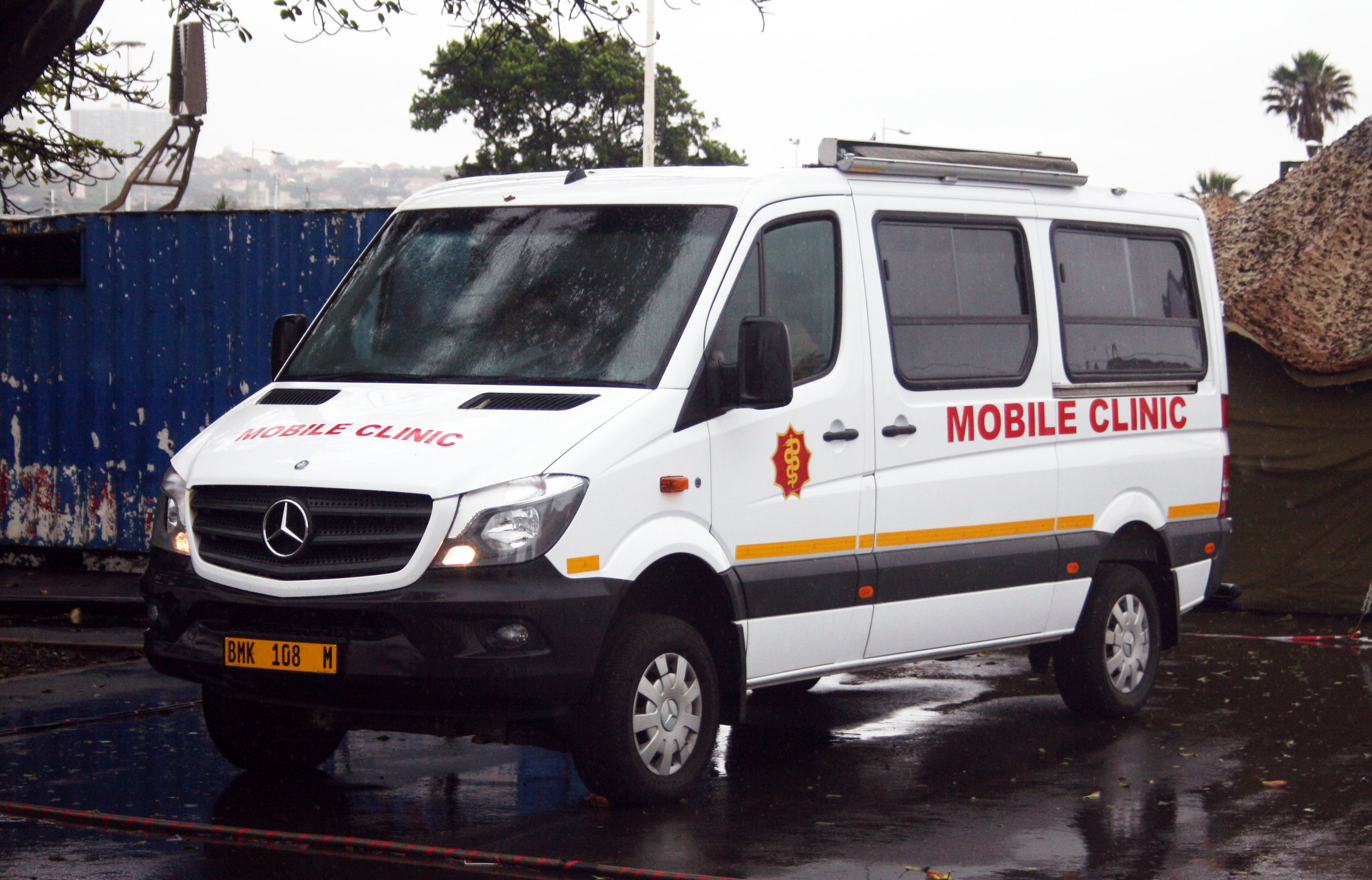
Mercedes-Benz Sprinter mobile clinic

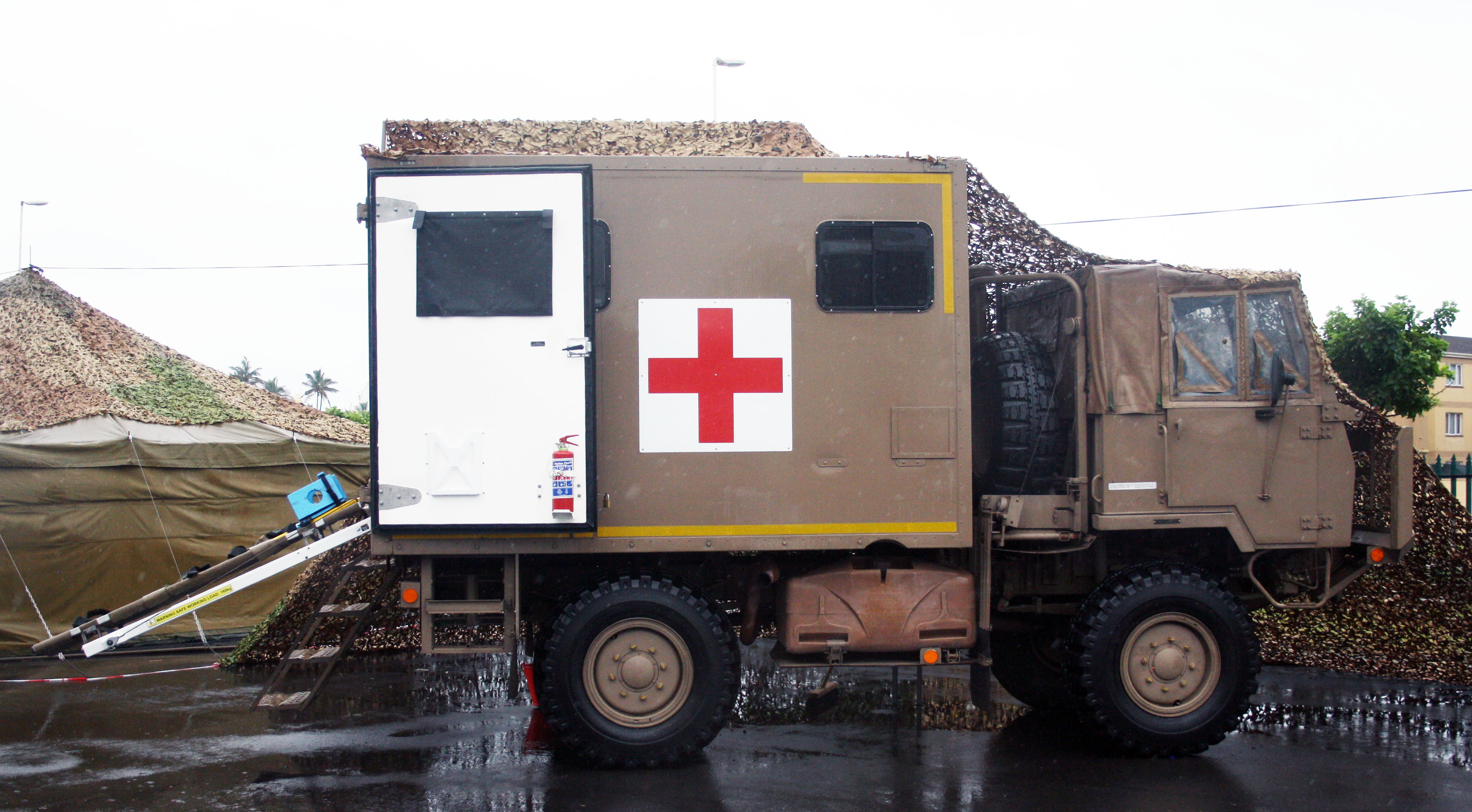
SAMIL 20

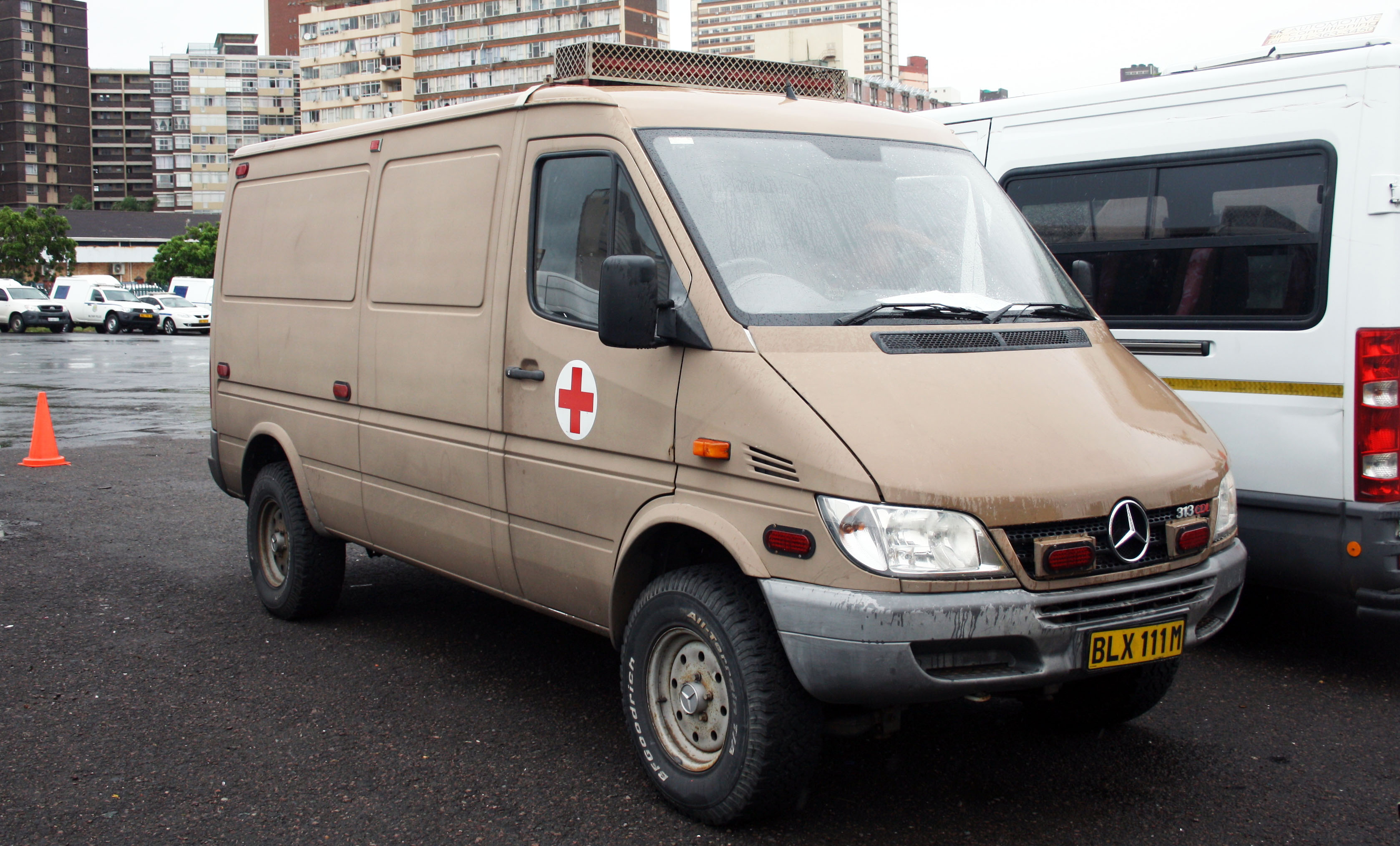
Mercedes-Benz 313CDI

== Personnel ==
1. Black (75.0%)
2. White (11.4%)
3. Indian (1.30%)
4. Coloureds (12.3%)
31 March 2019, the demographics of service personnel
1. Males (69.4%)
2. Females (30.6%)
31 March 2019, gender split in the SANDF

On 31 March 2019, the demographics of service personnel were as follows:

- 55,866 (75%) Black
- 8,479 (11.4%) White
- 981 (1.3%) Indian
- 9,162 (12.3%) Coloureds

The gender split in the SANDF as of 31 March 2019 is as follows:

- 51,684 men (69.4%)
- 22,824 women (30.6%)

The target for female recruits increased to 40% in 2010.

== Equipment ==
The SANDF operates a mixture of domestically produced and imported military equipment. A large proportion of its inventory is sourced from South Africa's domestic defence industry, while additional systems are procured mainly from European and American suppliers.

=== Defence industry ===
South Africa's defence industry is the primary domestic supplier of equipment to the SANDF, originating during the late 1960s and expanding significantly following the United Nations arms embargo imposed in 1963. This led to the development of a self-sufficient military-industrial base that remains the most advanced in Africa. The sector has historically supported a wide range of defence technologies, including conventional land, air, and naval systems, and played a role in South Africa's apartheid-era strategic weapons programmes, including ballistic missile development and research into nuclear, biological, and chemical capabilities. Although these programmes were terminated in the early 1990s, the industry continues to supply the majority of SANDF equipment. Major companies include Denel, Milkor, and Paramount Group, alongside more than a hundred specialised small and medium-sized enterprises that provide expertise in armoured vehicles, aerospace systems, naval technologies, munitions, electronics, and military support services.

== 2012 Defence Review ==
The South African Defence Review 2012 is a policy review process carried out by a panel of experts, chaired by retired politician and former Minister of Defence, Roelf Meyer.

The review was commissioned by Lindiwe Sisulu the then Minister of Defence and Military Veterans, in July 2011. The review was motivated by the need to correct the errors and shortcomings of the previous review. According to defence minister Lindiwe Sisulu, the old report was no longer relevant to South Africa's current situation.

== See also ==
- 2019 renaming of South African National Defence Force reserve units
- List of South African military bases
- List of South African military chiefs
- Military history of South Africa
- South African military decorations
