= Department of Defence (South Africa) =

Department of the South African government

- List: 10 other official names: Departement van Verdediging (Afrikaans); umNyango wezokuVikela (Southern Ndebele); iSebe lezoKhuseleko (Xhosa); uMnyango Wezokuvikela (Zulu); Litiko Letekuvikela (Swazi); Kgoro ya Tšhireletšo (Northern Sotho); Lefapha la Tshireletso (Sotho); Lefapha la Tshireletso (Tswana); Ndzawulo ya Vusirheleri (Tsonga); Muhasho wa Vhupileli (Venda)

Department overview
- Formed: 1912
- Type: Department
- Jurisdiction: Government of South Africa
- Headquarters: Armscor Building, Erasmuskloof, Pretoria; 25.813°S 28.260°E
- Employees: 79 045
- Annual budget: R 57.61 billion (2026/27)
- Minister responsible: Angie Motshekga, Minister of Defence and Military Veterans
- Deputy Minister responsible: Thabang Makwetla, Deputy Minister of Defence and Military Veterans
- Department executive: Gladys Sonto Kudjoe, Secretary for Defence
- Child agencies: Defence Force Service Commission; Armscor; Castle Control Board
- Key document: Defence Act, 2002
- Website: www.dod.mil.za

The Department of Defence is a department of the South African government. It oversees the South African National Defence Force, the armed forces responsible for defending South Africa.

As of June 2024 the Minister of Defence and Military Veterans is Angie Motshekga.

== Reported Severe Underfunding ==
Despite having highly trained elite units like the South African Special Forces (Recces), the SANDF faces steep challenges. Severe budgetary constraints have limited its ability to maintain advanced hardware (such as Gripen fighter jets and submarines) and have hampered critical modernization strategies. This has also been reported in the Department of Defence due to alleged corruption and underfunding

== 2023 Alleged Hack ==
In August 2023, a Russian Hacker Group named “Snatch” claimed to steal 200 TB of classified information, contracts, and personal identity information. They allegedly posted a 1.6TB Compressed Archive on the dark web. The Department of Defence claimed that it was “fake news” and no data leak occurred.

Snatch claimed it specifically chose the week of the 15th BRICS summit to release the data since the spotlight was on South Africa.

== Organisation and structure ==
The Macro-Structure of the Department of Defence as Approved by the Minister of Defence on 15 August 2008 is below:

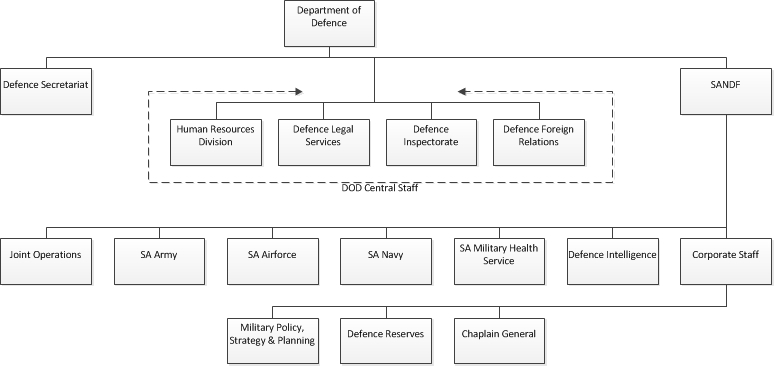

== See also ==
- List of South African military chiefs
