= Reutech Radar Systems =

- Industry: Radar Systems Manufacturing
- Headquarters: Stellenbosch, Western Cape, South Africa
- Parent: Reunert Limited
- Website: reutechradar.com

Reutech Radar Systems (RRS) is a subsidiary of Reunert Limited, a South African defence and aerospace technology company. The company headquartered in Stellenbosch manufactures radar and radar-related systems. It is a supplier of search and tracking systems for application in the military and paramilitary environments as well as a Movement and Surveying Radar System for open-pit mining.

== Products ==
Products made by RRS include 3D and 2D search and surveillance radars, tracking radars, sub-systems and mining sensor systems.
