= List of Algerian ships =

The list of ships of Algeria includes all ships designed, built, or operated in or by Algeria, in service with the Algerian National Navy.

== Ship classes ==
=== Adhafer-class corvette ===
- In service: 3 ships: Adhafer (920); El Fatih (921); Ezzadjer (922)
- Displacement: 2880 tons
- Armament: NG-16-1(76 mm) main gun, 2 Seven-barrel 30 mm Type 730 CIWS (Close-in weapon system), 2 Quad C-802 missiles
- China State Shipbuilding Corporation

=== Djebel Chenoua-class large patrol boat ===
- In service: 4 ships: Djebel Chenoua (351); El Chihab (352); El Kirch (353); Hassan Barbiear (807)
- Displacement: 550 tons
- Armament: 2 dual 14.5 mm machineguns
- Larbi Ben M'Hidi Hyproc Shipping Company
- Didouche Mourad - - -

=== El Idrissi coastal survey ship ===
- Displacement: 540 tons
- Crew: 28

=== El Mourafik salvage ship ===
- Displacement: 1000 tons
- Crew: 60
- Armament: 2 12.7 mm machineguns

=== Erradii-class frigates ===
- In service: 2 ships: Erradii (910); El Moudamir (911)
- Displacement: 3400 tons
- Armament: 127 mm main gun, RBS-15 SSM missiles

=== Kalaat Beni Hammed-class small landing ship ===
- In service: 2 ships
- Displacement: 2130 tons
- Crew: 81
- Aircraft: Helicopter deck only
- Capacity: 240 troops; 650 tons of cargo
- Armament: Dual 40 mm AA gun; 2 25 mm AA guns

=== Kebir (P4)-class patrol boat ===
- In service: 8-10 ships plus 2-3 building
- Displacement: 250 tons
- Crew: 27
- Armament: Dual 25 mm AA guns; 2 14.5 mm machineguns
- Note: Initial two ships carried a 76 mm OTO DP gun in place of the 25 mm guns.

=== Rajs Hadi Mubarek (Project 887EKM Kilo)-class diesel-electric submarine ===
- In service: 2 ships: 012 Rajs Hadj Mubarek, 013 El Hadj Slimane
- Displacement: 3076 tons
- Crew: 53
- Equipment: LF and HF sonar
- Armament: 6 21-inch (533 mm) torpedo tubes with 18 torpedoes, Club-S missiles.

=== Rais Hadi Slimane (Project 636M Improved Kilo)-class diesel-electric submarine ===
- In service: 4 ships: 021 Messali el Hadj, 022 Akram Pacha and two with unknown name (shipyard numerals 01346 and 01347).
- Displacement: 3126 tons
- Crew: 53
- Equipment: LF and HF sonar
- Armament: 6 21-inch (533 mm) torpedo tubes with 18 torpedoes, Club-S missiles.

=== Koni-class light frigate ===
- In service: 3 ships: Mourad Rais (901); Rais Kellik (902); Rais Korfu (903)
- Displacement: 1596 tons
- Crew: 130
- Equipment: Strut Curve air and surface search radar, MF hull sonar, Pop Group missile control, Hawk Screech gun control, Drum Tilt gun control, Watch Dog intercept
- Armament: SA-N-4 Gecko SAM system with 20 missiles, 2 dual 76.2 mm DP guns, 2 dual 30 mm AA guns, 2 RBU-6000 anti-submarine rocket systems, 2 depth-charge racks, mines
- Note: Recent overhaul by Russia has added new search radar, an additional Drum Tilt, and 2 dual 21-inch (533 mm) torpedo tubes to at least one ship, probably planned for installation on all ships.

=== Nanuchka II-class corvette ===
- In service: 3 ships: Rais Hamidou (801); Salah Rais (802); Rais Ali (803)
- Displacement: 675 tons
- Crew: 60
- Equipment: Square Tie surface search radar, Pop Group missile fire control, Muff Cob gun fire control, Bell Tap intercept, Cross Loop direction finder, chaff
- Armament: 4 SS-N-2C Styx SSM; SA-N-4 Gecko SAM system with 20 missiles; dual 57 mm DP gun
- Note: Recent upgrade has added new search radar, replaced the Styx missiles with 16 SS-N-25 Kh-35 SSM and the 57 mm guns with a single 30 mm AA gun.

=== Osa I-class missile boat ===
- In service: 2 ships
- Displacement: 209 tons
- Crew: 30
- Equipment: Square Tie surface search radar, Drum Tilt gun fire control
- Armament: 4 SS-N-2A Styx SSM; 2 dual 30 mm AA guns

=== Osa II-class missile boat ===
- In service: 9 ships
- Displacement: 240 tons
- Crew: 30
- Equipment: Square Tie surface search radar, Drum Tilt gun fire control
- Armament: 4 SS-N-2B Styx SSM; 2 dual 30 mm AA guns

=== Polnocny B-class utility landing craft ===
- In service: 1 ship
- Displacement: 800 tons
- Crew: 40
- Capacity: 130 troops; 180 tons cargo
- Armament: Dual 30 mm AA guns

== Individual ships ==
=== D ===
- Djebel Chenoua (351): Djebel Chenoua-class patrol boat in active service, commissioned 1988.

=== E ===
- El Chihab (352): Djebel Chenoua-class patrol boat in active service, commissioned 1995.
- El Djari (346): Kebir-class patrol boat in active service, commissioned 1986.
- El Hadi Slimane (O13): Kilo-class submarine in active service, commissioned 1988.
- El Idrissi (BH204): Japanese built coastal survey ship in active service, commissioned 1980.
- El Kechef (343): Kebir-class patrol boat in active service, commissioned 1984.
- El Mellah (938): three mast training tall ship constructed in Gdańsk, Poland, commissioned 2017.
- El Morakeb (342): Kebir-class patrol boat in active service, commissioned 1983.
- El Moudamir (911): El Radii-class frigate in active service, commissioned 2017.
- El Moukadem (348): Kebir-class patrol boat in active service.
- El Mourafik (261): Chinese built small salvage ship in active service, commissioned 1990.
- El Moutarid (344): Kebir-class patrol boat in active service, commissioned 1985.
- El Radii (910): El Radii-class frigate in active service, commissioned 2016.
- El Rassed (345): Kebir-class patrol boat in active service, commissioned 1985.
- El Saher (347): Kebir-class patrol boat in active service.
- El Wafi (355): Kebir-class patrol boat in active service.
- El Yadekh (341): Kebir-class patrol boat in active service, commissioned 1982.

=== K ===
- Kalaat Beni Abbès (474): Italian built amphibious transport dock in active service, commissioned 2014. Armed with Aster missiles
- Kalaat Beni Hammed (472): United Kingdom (Brooke Marine) built landing ship (BDSL) in active service, commissioned 1984.
- Kalaat Beni Rached (473): United Kingdom (Brooke Marine / Vosper Thornycroft) built landing ship (BDSL) in active service, commissioned 1984.

=== M ===
- Mourad Rais (901): Koni-class frigate in active service, commissioned 1980.

=== R ===
- Rais Ali (803): Nanuchka II-class corvette in active service, commissioned 1982.
- Rais Hamidou (801): Nanuchka II-class corvette in active service, commissioned 1980.
- Rais Kellik (902): Koni-class frigate in active service, commissioned 1982.
- Rais Korfu (903): Koni-class frigate in active service, commissioned 1984.
- Rajs Hadi Mubarek (O12): Kilo-class submarine in active service, commissioned 1987.

=== S ===
- Salah Rais (802): Nanuchka II-class corvette in active service, commissioned 1981.

=== Numbered vessels ===
- Romeo-class submarine S-10: Soviet built and transferred in 1982. Decommissioned in 1989.
- Romeo-class submarine S-11: Soviet built and transferred in 1983. Decommissioned in 1989.
- 471: Polish built Polnocny B-class utility landing craft in active service, commissioned 1976.
- 641: Osa I-class missile boat in active service, commissioned 1967.
- 642: Osa I-class missile boat in active service, commissioned 1967.
- 644: Osa II-class missile boat in active service, commissioned 1976.
- 645: Osa II-class missile boat in active service, commissioned 1976.
- 646: Osa II-class missile boat in active service, commissioned 1977.
- 647: Osa II-class missile boat in active service, commissioned 1977.
- 648: Osa II-class missile boat in active service, commissioned 1978.
- 649: Osa II-class missile boat in active service, commissioned 1978.
- 650: Osa II-class missile boat in active service, commissioned 1979.
- 651: Osa II-class missile boat in active service, commissioned 1979.
- 652: Osa II-class missile boat in active service, commissioned 1980.
