= Yugoslav frigate Split =

First frigate of the Yugoslavian Navy

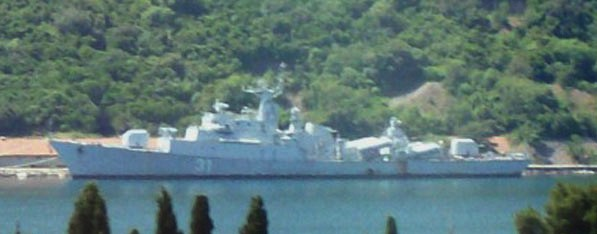
- Split moored in the Bay of Kotor in 2008.

History

Soviet Union
- Name: Sokol
- Builder: Zelenodolsk Shipyard, Zelenodolsk, Soviet Union
- Laid down: January 1978
- Launched: 21 April 1979
- Commissioned: 30 November 1979
- Fate: Transferred to the Yugoslav Navy in 1980

SFR Yugoslavia
- Name: Split
- Namesake: City of Split
- Acquired: 1980
- Fate: Commissioned in the Navy of FR Yugoslavia/Serbia and Montenegro in 1992

FR Yugoslavia/Serbia and Montenegro
- Name: RF-31
- Acquired: 1992
- Decommissioned: 17 August 2001
- Fate: Scrapped in 2013

General characteristics
- Class & type: Koni-class (Project 1159) frigate
- Displacement: 1,590 t (1,565 long tons) (full load)
- Length: 96.5 m (316 ft 7 in)
- Beam: 12.5 m (41 ft 0 in)
- Draught: 4.1 m (13 ft 5 in)
- Propulsion: CODAG powering three shafts: 1 × gas turbine; 2 × diesel engines
- Speed: 27–28 knots (50–52 km/h; 31–32 mph)
- Range: 1,800 nmi (3,300 km; 2,100 mi) at 14 knots (26 km/h; 16 mph)
- Complement: 123
- Armament: 4 × P-20 anti-ship missiles; 1 × 4K33 Osa-M surface-to-air missile launcher; 2 × double-barrelled AK-726 76.2 mm (3.00 in) naval guns; 2 × double-barrelled AK-230 30 mm (1.2 in) guns; 2 × RBU-6000 anti-submarine rocket launchers

Split (pennant number VPBR-31) was a Koni-class frigate in service with the Yugoslav Navy (JRM). Laid down and completed during the late 1970s as Sokol of the Soviet Navy, it was the fourth ship of a class that was being built by the Zelenodolsk Shipyard primarily for export to various friendly navies. The ship was acquired by the JRM in 1980 and commissioned as Split, becoming the second ship in JRM service to be named after the city of Split. It was soon followed by a second Koni-class hull, Koper (VPBR-32), commissioned in the JRM in 1982. Designated as a Large Patrol Boat (Serbo-Croatian: Veliki patrolni brod – VPBR) by the JRM, Split's original armament consisting of naval guns, anti-submarine rocket launchers and anti-aircraft missiles was further improved by the addition of four P-20 anti-ship missiles, making it the most versatile ship in the JRM inventory at the time.

Following the outbreak of the Croatian War of Independence in 1991, Split was involved in enforcing a naval blockade of the Croatian coast. In mid-November it served as the command ship of a tactical group which was controlling the waters around its namesake, the city of Split. On 14 November, Croatian naval commandos attacked and damaged the patrol boat Mukos (PČ-176), leading to a naval engagement that would become known as the Battle of the Dalmatian Channels. The following morning, Split and the rest of its tactical group opened fire against the islands of Šolta and Brač and the city of Split itself. Faced with Croatian Navy coastal artillery returning fire, Split began retreating east, sailing through the Korčula Channel to the JRM-controlled island of Vis.

With the Yugoslav People's Army ending its campaign in Croatia in early 1992, Split and the rest of the JRM fleet was relocated to Montenegro where it would be reformed as the Navy of FR Yugoslavia (RMVJ). In the RMVJ, Split was redesignated as RF-31 and possibly renamed Beograd, although sources are contradictory regarding this issue. The ship was decommissioned on 17 August 2001 and spent the next several years moored in the Bay of Kotor. After two unsuccessful attempts of selling it as a complete warship, it was sold for scrap and broken up in 2013.

== Background ==
During the 1960s and 1970s, the Yugoslav Navy (Serbo-Croatian: Jugoslavenska ratna mornarica – JRM) retired a number of major surface vessels of World War II vintage. These included the destroyer Split (relegated to a stationary training ship during the 1970s and decommissioned in 1980), two British-built W-class destroyers (both stricken in 1971) and four former Regia Marina large torpedo boats (destroyer escorts) of the Ariete and Ciclone class. During this period, the bulk of JRM firepower consisted of fast attack craft in the form of ten Osa-class missile boats and fourteen Shershen-class torpedo boats. These vessels, however, lacked adequately capable radars, communications and air-defense systems while also completely lacking any form of anti-submarine capabilities. Because of this, the JRM sought to introduce large, multi-role vessels which would fill this gap. The decision was made to acquire two Soviet-built Koni-class frigates, which would soon materialize in the form of Split (VPBR-31) and its sister ship Koper (VPBR-32).

== Description and construction ==
Split was laid down in January 1978 at the A.M. Gorky Shipyard in Zelenodolsk as the fourth ship in its class (Projekt 1159). Launched on 21 April 1979, it was temporarily commissioned with the Soviet Navy on 30 November 1979 under the name Sokol. On 10 March 1980, it was acquired by the JRM for a price of 18.27 million dollars, given a new name, Split, and classified as a VPBR (Croatian: Veliki Patrolni BRod; lit. 'Large patrol boat').

Split measured 96.51 metres (316.6 feet) in length, had a beam of 12.56 m (41.2 ft) and displaced 1,590 tonnes (1,560 long tons) while fully loaded. Like other Koni-class frigates it employed a CODAG type propulsion combining a single M-8G 20.000 hp gas turbine with two 8000 hp diesel engines giving it a maximum speed of 27–28 knots (50–52 km/h; 31–32 mph) Power was also provided by one 200 kW and two 300 kW diesel generators. The ship had a range of 4,500 nmi (8,300 km; 5,200 mi) at 14 knots (26 km/h; 16 mph) and an endurance of 10 days.

ASW weapons included two RBU-6000 launchers mounted side by side, controlled by the "Burya" fire control system with additional 120 rounds in storage, as well as twelve BB-1 conventional depth charges. Cannon armament consisted of two 76 mm AK-726 dual guns mounted on the ship's bow and stern with two AK-230 CIWS placed on the sides and controlled by the MR-104 "Ris" FCS. Air defence was provided by a single dual mount for the 4K33 "Osa-M" system with 20 additional missiles.

Four stern facing launchers for P-20 anti-ship missiles were installed soon after the ship was commissioned with the JRM.

== Career ==
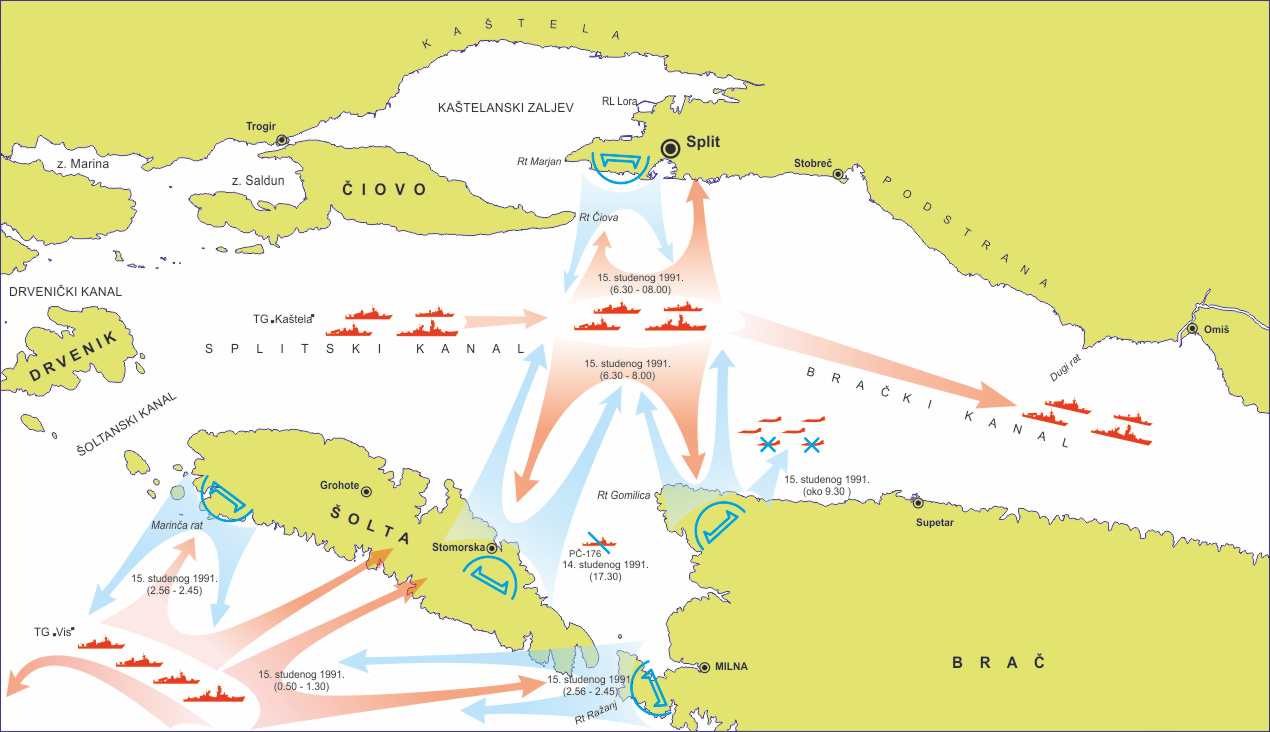
Approximate positions of Yugoslav Navy ships, including Split, on 15 November during the Battle of the Dalmatian Channels.

During the early stages of the Croatian War of Independence, Split – often mistakenly referred to as a destroyer – served as the command ship of the TG Kaštela (naval tactical group) which, along with two other tactical groups ( Ploče and Vis), was tasked with enforcing the naval blockade of the Croatian coastline and islands, and playing a command role in the Kaštela Tactical naval Group of the Yugoslav Navy. As a sign of retaliation for sinking the patrol boat Mukos (PČ-176) a day earlier, in the morning hours of 15 November, Split, operating under the code name "Sava", along with other ships of the tactical group opened fire on the city of Split and the islands of Brač and Šolta. On 16 November, TGs Kaštela and Ploče attempted another thrust in the Korčula Channel, but Croatian coastal artillery batteries scored several hits on JRM ships, sinking two minesweepers and damaging other units, including Split. The Yugoslav Fleet was forced to withdraw to Vis.

On 19 November Split was called in to rescue seamen from two amphibioius boats who were sinking off Vis. These were part of a convoy of overloaded JRM ships that was sailing from Pula to Vis across open sea during strong jugo winds. While rescuing the crew from one of the landing crafts, two sailors died because the ladder thrown to them from Split, accidentally hit them causing them to drown.

After the retreat of all Yugoslav Navy forces from Croatia, Split was relocated to Montenegro where it was renamed Beograd in 1993 with its designation being changed to RF-31 (sr. raketna fregata; eng. missile frigate).

== Decommissioning and aftermath ==
On 17 August 2001, the FR Yugoslav Ministry of Defence decommissioned the ship declaring it redundant. The ship was located within the "Sava Kovačević" overhaul shipyard in Tivat until 2008, when it was berthed near a military object on Luštica. Due to the lack of any kind of maintenance, parts of the hull became corroded which resulted in several breaches so sea water needed to be pumped out from time to time.

2004 marked the last time Split sailed on its own during a demonstration for the representatives of the Sri Lankan Navy who were interested in buying the ship. Although the deal was near done, the catastrophic 2004 tsunami and subsequent damage prompted the Sri Lankans to stop the acquisition of all new military equipment, including the purchase of Split. In 2009, Split along with three other frigates was being sold for a price of 3.2 million euros, each. In May 2011, the price for Split was reduced to 1 million euros, but again, no deals were made.

In 2010, divers from Herceg Novi proposed reaching an agreement with Croatia and scuttling the Split on the sea border of the two countries where it would become a diving site. The act was also to have a symbolic meaning of peace because the ship became notorious in Croatia after attacking the city for which it was named.

In October 2011, the Government of Montenegro adopted a document in which it was stated that attempts at selling the ship as a complete warship will stop, and it would instead be sold for scrap. Before the scrapping took place, weapons systems, radio communication and other electrical equipment as well as two MTU 8V396 diesel generators that were installed in 1997 and 1999, were removed from the ship. On 19 August 2013, Split was towed away to a ship breaking yard in Durrës after being sold to an Albanian company for 400,000 euros.

== See also ==
- List of ships of the Yugoslav Navy
- Kotor-class frigate
