= Algerian frigate Mourad Rais =

Koni-class frigate of the Algerian Navy

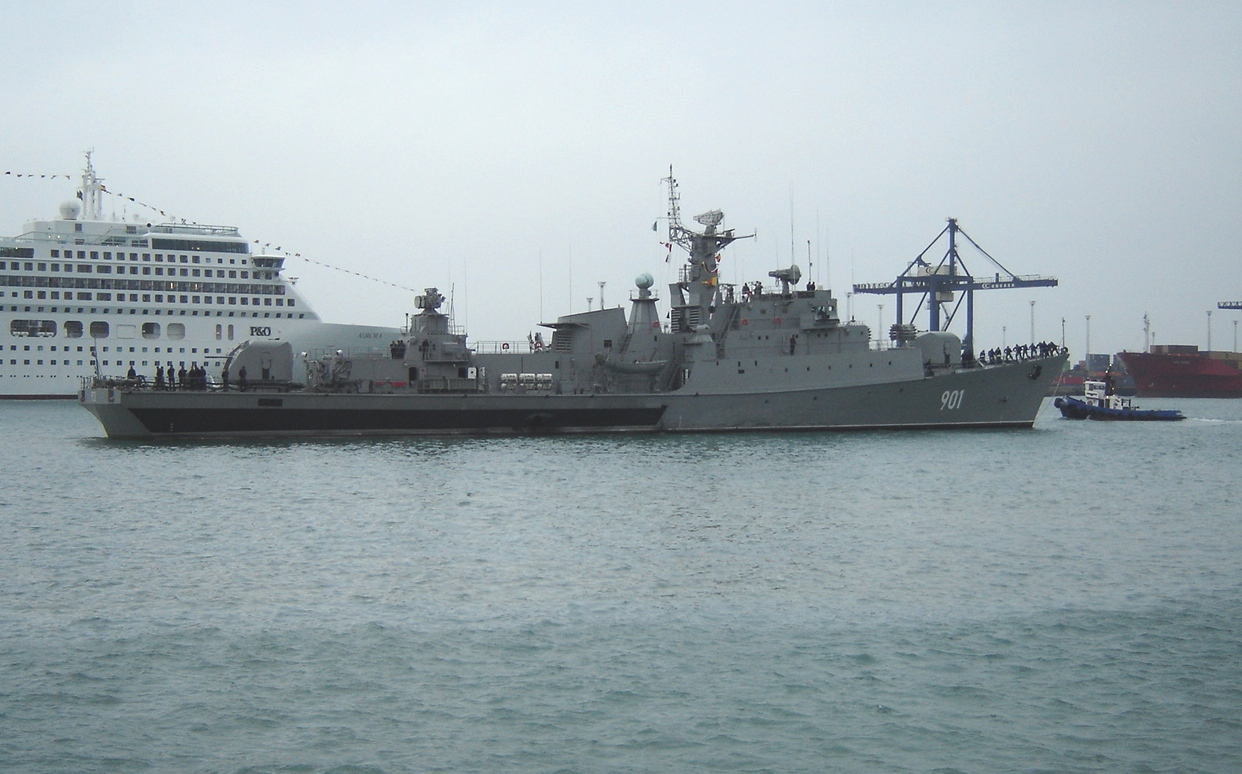
- Mourad Rais in Cádiz, c. 2007

History

Soviet Union
- Name: SKR-482
- Builder: A.M. Gorky Shipyard, Zelenodolsk, Tatar ASSR
- Yard number: 250
- Laid down: 10 June 1978
- Launched: 12 January 1980
- Commissioned: 30 September 1980
- Fate: Transferred to Algeria December 1980

Algeria
- Name: Mourad Rais; (مراد رايس)
- Namesake: Murat Reis the Elder
- Commissioned: 20 December 1980
- Home port: Mers El Kébir
- Identification: Pennant number: 901
- Status: In active service

General characteristics
- Type: Koni II-class frigate
- Displacement: 1,463 t (1,440 long tons) standard; 1,930 t (1,900 long tons) full load
- Length: 96.4 m (316 ft)
- Beam: 12.6 m (41 ft)
- Draught: 3.5 m (11 ft)
- Propulsion: CODAG; 2 × Russki B-68 diesel engines, 11,630 kilowatts (15,600 shp); 1 × SGW Nikolayev M8B gas turbine, 13,250 kilowatts (17,770 shp); 3 × shafts
- Speed: 27 knots (50 km/h)
- Range: 1,800 NM (3,300 km) at 14 knots (26 km/h)
- Complement: 130
- Sensors & processing systems: Pozitiv-ME1.2 air/surface search radar; 3P-60 UE weapons control; MR-104 Rys fire control radar; MPZ-301 fire control radar; Don-2 navigation radar; "High Pole B" IFF; MG-322 sonar
- Electronic warfare & decoys: NRJ-6A ESM; 2 × PJ-46 decoy launchers
- Armament: 2 × twin-barrel 76 mm AK-726; 2 × twin-barrel 30 mm AK-230; 2 × RBU-6000 Smerch-2 anti-submarine rockets; 2 × depth charge racks; 22 × naval mines

Mourad Rais (901) (also transliterated Murat Reis, Arabic: مراد رايس) is the first Koni II-class frigate of the Algerian National Navy.

== Design and description ==
Mourad Rais is a Project 1159T frigate (NATO reporting name: Koni II). The frigate has a length of 96.4 m (316 ft 3 in), beam of 12.6 m (41 ft 4 in) and draught of 3.5 m (11 ft 6 in). The frigate has a displacement of 1,463 tonnes (1,440 long tons) standard and 1,930 tonnes (1,900 long tons) at full load. The ship is powered by combined diesel and gas (CODAG) propulsion system, consisted of one SGW Nikolayev M8B gas turbine with 13,250 kilowatts (17,770 shp) and two Russki B-68 diesel engines with 11,630 kilowatts (15,600 shp) connected to three shafts. She has a top speed of 27 knots (50 km/h; 31 mph) with gas turbine and 22 knots (41 km/h; 25 mph) with diesels only, and range of 1,800 nautical miles (3,300 km; 2,100 mi) with cruising speed of 14 knots (26 km/h; 16 mph). The ship has a complement of 130 personnel.

The ship is armed with two AK-726 twin-barrel 76 mm guns and two AK-230 twin-barrel 30 mm autocannons. For anti-submarine warfare, the frigate are equipped with a pair of RBU-6000 213-millimetre (8.4 in) Smerch-2 12-barrel anti-submarine rocket launchers and two depth charge racks. The ship could also carry 22 naval mines. As built, Mourad Rais was equipped with one 4K33 Osa-M (SA-N-4 'Gecko') twin missile launcher with capacity of 20 missiles for anti-aircraft and limited anti-surface capability.

As built, the ship sensor suites includes 3P-60 UE weapons control, MR-302 Rubka ("Strut Curve") air/surface search radar, Don-2 navigation radar, "High Pole B" IFF, "Watch Dog" and "Quad Loop" Electronic Support Measures (ESM) systems, two optronic directors, and MG-322 hull-mounted sonar. Fire control for the weapons consisted of Fut-B ("Hawk Screech") radar for the 76 mm guns, MR-104 Rys ("Drum Tilt") radar for the 30 mm autocannons, and MPZ-301 ("Pop Group") radar for missile control. The vessel was also equipped with two PK-16 decoy-dispenser system which used chaff as a form of missile defense.

=== Modernization ===
Mourad Rais underwent a modernization refit at Severnaya Verf in Saint Petersburg from late 2007 to 2011. The refit included the replacement of MR-302 Rubka with Pozitiv-ME1.2 radar, the removal of 4K33 Osa-M missile launcher and Fut-B radar, and replacement of ESM and decoy systems with new NRJ-6A ESM system and two PJ-46 decoy launchers.

== Construction and career ==
The frigate was laid down on 10 June 1978 at the A.M. Gorky Shipyard in Zelenodolsk with yard number 250. Launched on 12 January 1980, the ship was temporarily commissioned with the Soviet Navy on 30 September 1980 as SKR-482.

The ship was delivered to Algeria via Black Sea in December 1980. She was commissioned into Algerian National Navy as Mourad Rais on 20 December 1980.
