= Algerian frigate Rais Korfou =

Koni-class frigate of the Algerian Navy

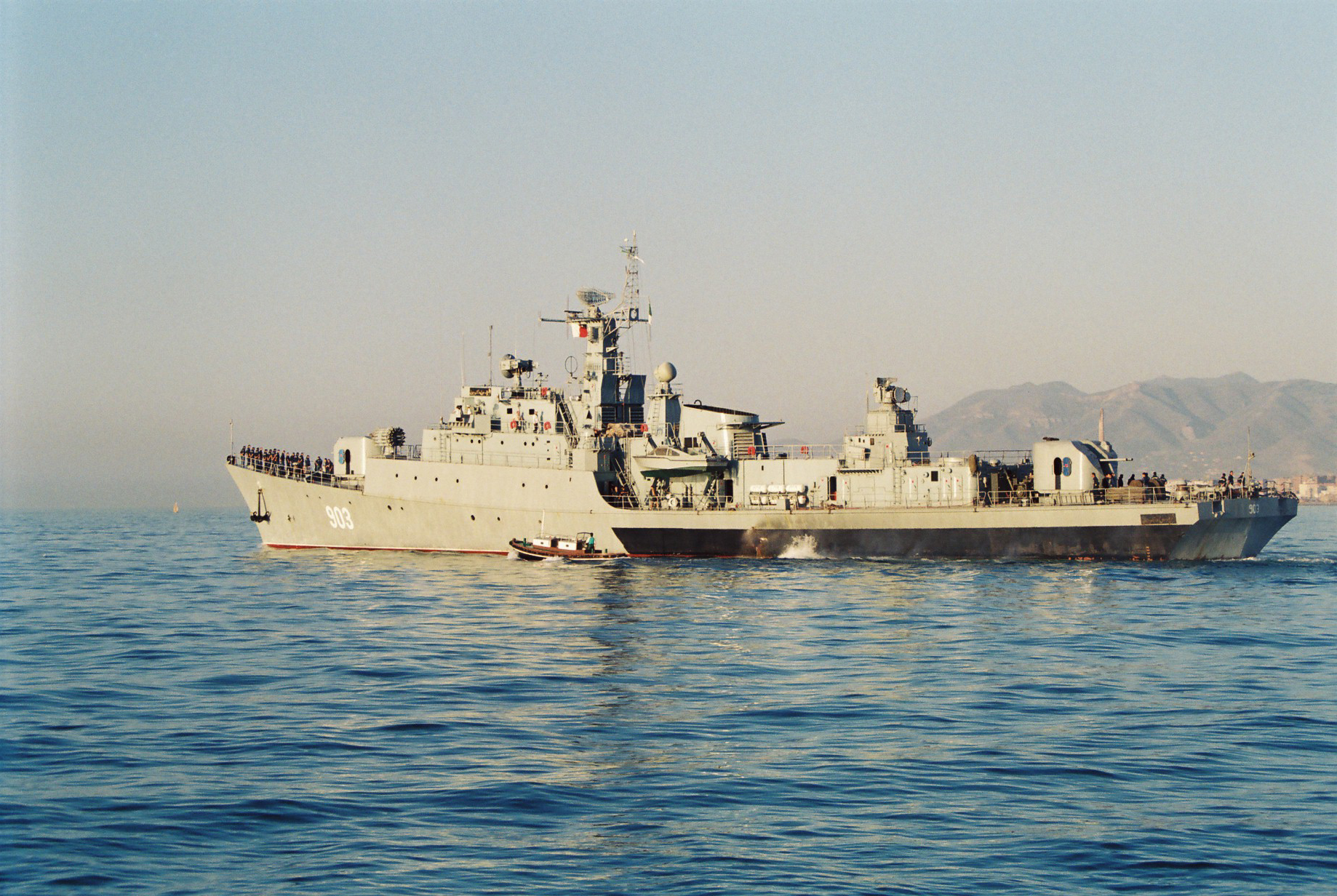
- Rais Korfou in Málaga, c. 1990s

History

Soviet Union
- Name: SKR-129
- Builder: A.M. Gorky Shipyard, Zelenodolsk, Tatar ASSR
- Yard number: 254
- Laid down: 7 July 1982
- Launched: 11 November 1983
- Commissioned: 30 August 1984
- Identification: Hull number: 844
- Fate: Transferred to Algeria October 1984

Algeria
- Name: Rais Korfou; (رايس قورصو)
- Namesake: Hasan Corso
- Commissioned: 3 January 1985
- Home port: Mers El Kébir
- Identification: Pennant number: 903
- Status: In active service

General characteristics
- Type: Koni II-class frigate
- Displacement: 1,463 t (1,440 long tons) standard; 1,930 t (1,900 long tons) full load
- Length: 96.4 m (316 ft)
- Beam: 12.6 m (41 ft)
- Draught: 3.5 m (11 ft)
- Propulsion: CODAG; 2 × Russki B-68 diesel engines, 11,630 kilowatts (15,600 shp); 1 × SGW Nikolayev M8B gas turbine, 13,250 kilowatts (17,770 shp); 3 × shafts
- Speed: 27 knots (50 km/h)
- Range: 1,800 NM (3,300 km) at 14 knots (26 km/h)
- Complement: 130
- Sensors & processing systems: Pozitiv-ME1.2 air/surface search radar; 3P-60 UE weapons control; MR-104 Rys fire control radar; MPZ-301 fire control radar; Don-2 navigation radar; "High Pole B" IFF; MG-322 sonar
- Electronic warfare & decoys: NRJ-6A ESM; 2 × PJ-46 decoy launchers
- Armament: 2 × twin-barrel 76 mm AK-726; 2 × twin-barrel 30 mm AK-230; 2 × 2 533 mm torpedo launchers; 2 × RBU-6000 Smerch-2 anti-submarine rockets; 2 × depth charge racks; 22 × naval mines

Rais Korfou (903) (Arabic: رايس قورصو, also transliterated Rais Korfo or Rais Korfu) is a Koni II-class frigate of the Algerian National Navy.

== Design and description ==
Rais Korfou is a Project 1159T frigate (NATO reporting name: Koni II). The frigate has a length of 96.4 m (316 ft), beam of 12.6 m (41 ft) and draught of 3.5 m (11 ft). The frigate has a displacement of 1,463 tonnes (1,440 long tons) standard and 1,930 tonnes (1,900 long tons) at full load. The ship is powered by combined diesel and gas (CODAG) propulsion system, consisted of one SGW Nikolayev M8B gas turbine with 13,250 kilowatts (17,770 shp) and two Russki B-68 diesel engines with 11,630 kilowatts (15,600 shp) connected to three shafts. She has a top speed of 27 knots (50 km/h) with gas turbine and 22 knots (41 km/h) with diesels only, and range of 1,800 NM (3,300 km) with cruising speed of 14 knots (26 km/h). The ship has a complement of 130 personnel.

The ship is armed with two AK-726 twin-barrel 76 mm guns and two AK-230 twin-barrel 30 mm autocannons. For anti-submarine warfare, the frigate are equipped with a pair of RBU-6000 213 mm (8 in) Smerch-2 12-barrel anti-submarine rocket launchers and two depth charge racks. The ship could also carry 22 naval mines. As built, Rais Korfou was equipped with one 4K33 Osa-M (SA-N-4 'Gecko') twin missile launcher with capacity of 20 missiles for anti-aircraft and limited anti-surface capability.

As built, the ship sensor suites includes 3P-60 UE weapons control, MR-302 Rubka ("Strut Curve") air/surface search radar, Don-2 navigation radar, "High Pole B" IFF, "Watch Dog" and "Quad Loop" Electronic Support Measures (ESM) systems, two optronic directors, and MG-322 hull-mounted sonar. Fire control for the weapons consisted of Fut-B ("Hawk Screech") radar for the 76 mm guns, MR-104 Rys ("Drum Tilt") radar for the 30 mm autocannons, and MPZ-301 ("Pop Group") radar for missile control. The vessel was also equipped with two PK-16 decoy-dispenser system which used chaff as a form of missile defense.

=== Modernization ===
Rais Korfou underwent a modernization refit in Kronstadt from 1997 to November 2000. The refit included the replacement of MR-302 Rubka with Pozitiv-ME1.2 radar, the removal of 4K33 Osa-M missile launcher and Fut-B radar, fitting of two twin 533 mm torpedo launchers amidships and replacement of ESM and decoy systems with new NRJ-6A ESM system and two PJ-46 decoy launchers.

== Construction and career ==
The frigate was laid down on 7 July 1982 at the A.M. Gorky Shipyard in Zelenodolsk with yard number 254. Launched on 11 November 1983, the ship was temporarily commissioned with the Soviet Navy on 30 August 1984 as SKR-129 with hull number 844.

The ship departed Soviet Union for Algeria in October 1984. She was commissioned into Algerian National Navy as Rais Korfou in Algiers on 3 January 1985.
