= Algerian frigate El Moudamir =

MEKO 200 frigate of the Algerian Navy

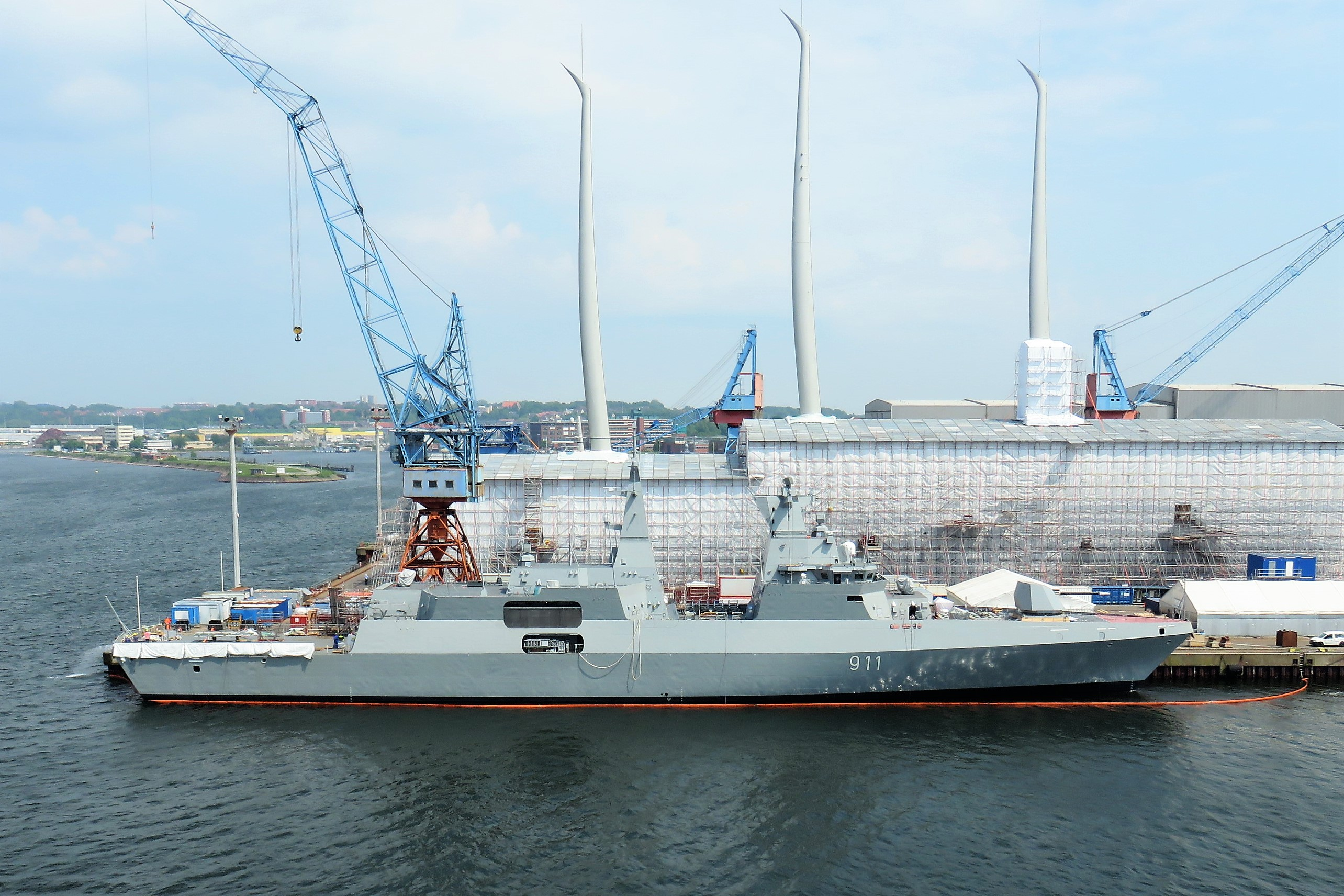
- El Moudamir during fitting out at GNYH Kiel shipyard on 30 May 2016. Note the masts of the covered sailing yacht A in the background

History

Algeria
- Name: El Moudamir; (المدمر)
- Ordered: March 2012
- Builder: ADM Kiel GmbH shipyard, Kiel
- Launched: 11 December 2015
- Commissioned: 24 May 2017
- Identification: Pennant number: 911
- Status: In active service

General characteristics
- Type: Erradii-class frigate
- Displacement: 3,700 tonnes (3,600 long tons) full
- Length: 121 m (397 ft)
- Beam: 16.3 m (53 ft)
- Propulsion: CODAG WARP; 2 × MTU 16V 1163 TB93 diesel engines, 5,920 kilowatts (7,940 hp); 2 × shafts, CPP; 1 × General Electric LM2500, 20,000 kilowatts (27,000 hp); 1 × waterjet
- Speed: 28 knots (52 km/h)
- Range: 7,200 NM (13,300 km) at 16 knots (30 km/h)
- Boats & landing craft carried: 1 × seaboat; 1 × RHIB
- Complement: 120
- Sensors & processing systems: Sea Giraffe AMB air/surface surveillance radar; EOS-500 fire control director; 2 × CEROS 200 Fire Control Radars; 2 × VisionMaster FT navigation radars; Atlas Elektronik ASO 723 sonar; Atlas ANCS CMS
- Electronic warfare & decoys: Indra RIGEL ECM & ESM; 4 × Rheinmetall MASS decoy launchers; 2 × Leonardo WASS C310 decoy launchers
- Armament: 1 × Otobreda 127/64 gun; 2 × 30 mm DS30M Mark 2 guns; 2–4 × 12.7 mm M2HB Browning; 16 × RBS 15 Mk 3 SSM launchers; 32 × Umkhonto-IR VLS cells; 2 × 2 324 mm torpedo tubes for MU90 torpedoes
- Aircraft carried: 2 × Super Lynx 300 helicopters
- Aviation facilities: Flight deck and hangar

El Moudamir (911) (Arabic: المدمر, lit. "destructive") is the second Erradii-class frigate of the Algerian National Navy.

== Design and description ==
El Moudamir is a MEKO A-200AN frigate, designed by Blohm + Voss. The frigate has a length of 121 m (397 ft) and beam of 16.3 m (53 ft). The frigate has a full load displacement of 3,700 tonnes (3,600 long tons) and is powered by combined diesel and gas waterjet and refined propeller (CODAG WARP) propulsion system, consisted of two 5,920 kilowatts (7,940 hp) MTU 16V 1163 TB93 diesel engines connected to two shafts with controllable pitch propellers, and one 20,000 kilowatts (27,000 hp) General Electric LM2500 gas turbine to power the waterjet. She has a speed of 28 knots (52 km/h) and range of 7,200 NM (13,300 km) with cruising speed of 16 knots (30 km/h). The ship has a complement of 120 personnel.

The ship is armed with one Otobreda 127 mm/64 gun, two 30 mm DS30M Mark 2 guns, and two to four 12.7 mm M2HB Browning machine guns. For surface warfare, El Moudamir are equipped with 16 Saab RBS 15 Mk 3 anti-ship missile launchers, consisted of eight launchers on both sides, and 32 vertical launching system cells for Denel Umkhonto-IR anti-aircraft missiles. For anti-submarine warfare, she is equipped with two twin 324 mm torpedo tubes for MU90 Impact torpedoes.

The frigate's countermeasures systems consisted of two Rheinmetall Multi Ammunition Softkill System (MASS) decoy launchers in each side of the ship and two decoy launchers for Leonardo WASS C310 surface anti-torpedo countermeasure systems.

Her sensors and electronic systems consisted of Saab Sea Giraffe AMB air/surface surveillance radar, two Saab CEROS 200 Fire Control Radars, Saab EOS-500 gyro-stabilized electro-optical fire control director, Atlas Elektronik ASO 723 sonar, Atlas ANCS combat management system, two VisionMaster FT navigation radars, Indra RIGEL ECM and ESM system.

El Moudamir also has a flight deck and hangar capable to accommodate two AgustaWestland Super Lynx 300 helicopters. The helicopters are consisted of two type, capable of either anti-submarine (ASW) or anti-surface (ASuW) warfare. The ASW helicopters are fitted with Compact FLASH dipping sonar and carried MU90 torpedoes, while the ASuW helicopters could carry a loadout of Mokopa air-to-surface missiles and a FN M3M 12.7 mm heavy machine gun. The ship has one seaboat and one rigid-hulled inflatable boat.

== Construction and career ==
The Algerian government signed a contract with ThyssenKrupp Marine Systems (TKMS) in March 2012 for two MEKO A-200AN frigates, with option for two additional frigates. The contract also included six AgustaWestland Super Lynx 300 helicopters for the frigates, as well as training and support packages.

As TKMS no longer owns its surface vessels shipyard, the construction of the two frigates was subcontracted to ADM Kiel GmbH shipyard (later owned by German Naval Yards Holdings) in Kiel, Germany. El Moudamir was launched on 11 December 2015. The ship started its first sea trial on 25 July 2016. The frigate departed Kiel on 15 May 2017, arriving in Algeria on 21 May. El Moudamir was formally commissioned on 24 May 2017 in by the Chief of Staff of the People's National Army Lieutenant General Ahmed Gaid Salah.

El Moudamir carried out an exercise with Spanish frigate Álvaro de Bazán in the Mediterranean Sea on 14 September 2020, after the latter ship had visited Algiers on 12–14 September. The frigate attended the 2022 Doha International Maritime Defence Exhibition and Conference (DIMDEX) held in Doha, Qatar on 21–23 March 2022.
