= Koni-class frigate =

Class of Soviet anti-submarine frigates

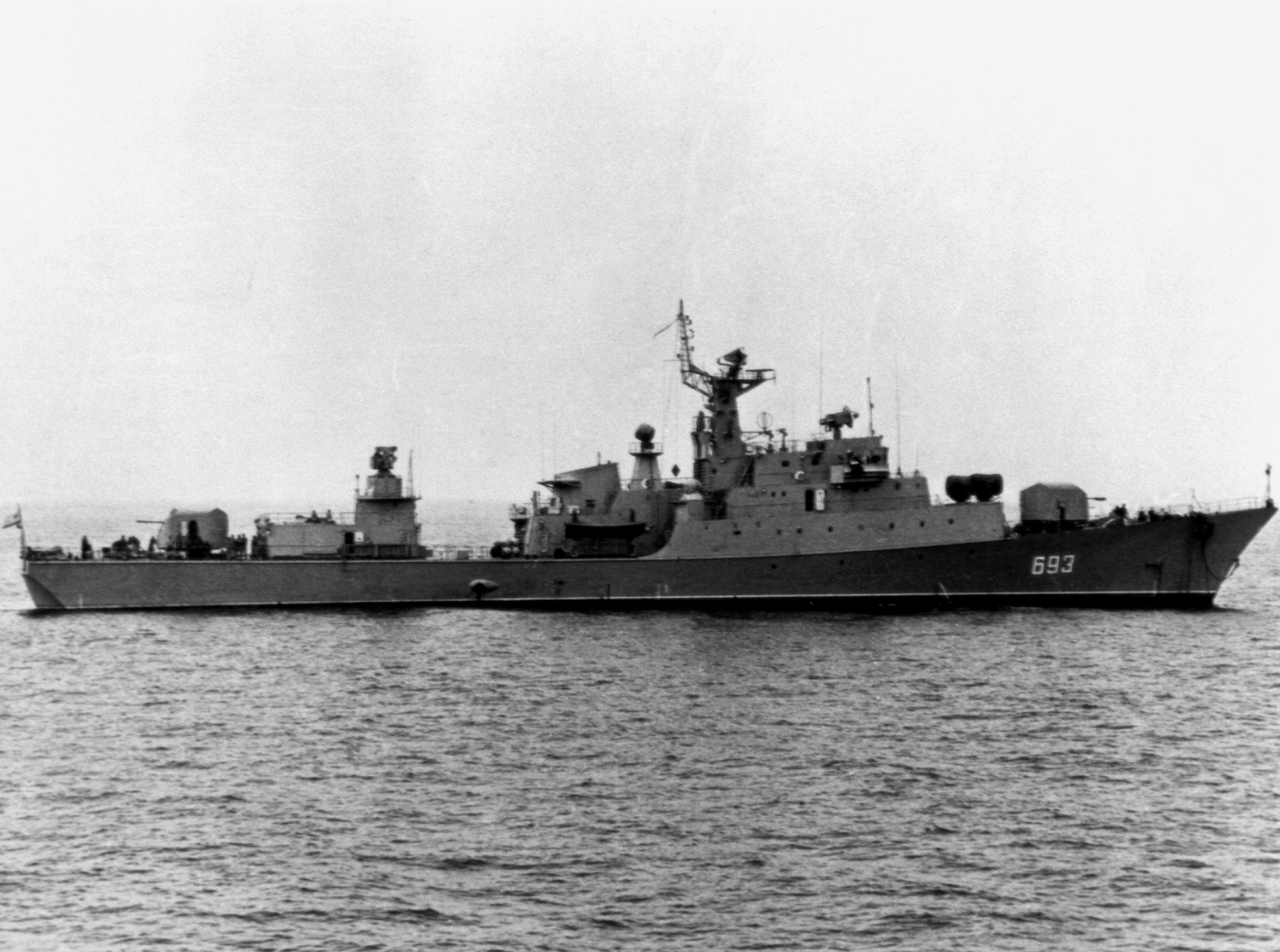

Class overview
- Name: Project 1159 Del'fin anti-submarine ship
- Operators: Soviet Navy; Algerian National Navy; Bulgarian Navy; Cuban Revolutionary Navy; Volksmarine; German Navy; Egyptian Navy; Libyan Navy; Yugoslav Navy; Navy of Serbia and Montenegro
- Preceded by: Mirka class
- Succeeded by: Gepard class
- Built: 1975–1988
- Completed: 14
- Active: 5
- Lost: 1

General characteristics
- Type: Light ASW Frigate
- Displacement: 1,140 tons (standard); 1,900 tons (full load)
- Length: 95 m (311 ft 8 in)
- Beam: 12.8 m (42 ft 0 in)
- Draft: 5 m (16 ft 5 in)
- Propulsion: CODAG 1 gas turbine M8V DN59L4 unit 13.4 MW + 2 diesels; 3 shafts; 35,000 shp (26,000 kW) total
- Speed: 27 knots (50 km/h; 31 mph)
- Range: 3,300 km (1,800 nmi; 2,100 mi) at 26 km/h (14 kn; 16 mph)
- Complement: 110
- Sensors & processing systems: MR-104 Rys' (NATO designation: "Drum Tilt"), Radar barret-2, Slim Net, Strut Curve, Pop Group, Hawk Screech; Sonar - Herkules hull mounted & dipping sonar
- Armament: 1 × 4K33 Osa-M launcher (20 missiles); 4 × P-15M Termit anti-ship missile launchers; 2 × AK-726 twin 76.2 mm dual purpose guns; 2 × AK-230 twin 30 mm guns; 2 × RBU-6000 Depth charge launchers; provision for 20 naval mines

The Koni class is the NATO reporting name for Project 1159 Del'fin anti-submarine warfare frigates built by the Soviet Union. 14 were built in Zelenodolsk shipyard between 1975 and 1988. They were originally intended to replace the older Riga-class frigates, but were instead chosen as a design for export to various friendly navies. The Koni I sub class were designed for European waters and the Koni II were made for warmer waters. One ship was retained by the Soviets in the Black Sea for training foreign crews. Only a few of these vessels remain in service.

The Romanian Admiral Petre Bărbuneanu-class corvettes were similar.

== Design ==
=== Armament ===
The armament consisted of two AK-726 twin 76 mm (3.0 in) gun mountings and two AK-230 twin 30 mm (1.2 in) anti-aircraft guns, 4 P-15M Termit anti-ship missile launchers were fitted in some ships, depth charge and naval mine racks were fitted at the stern. The Libyan vessels had a redesigned layout with the P-15M missiles forward of the bridge. The ships had contemporary Soviet radar and sonar.

=== Propulsion ===
The ships had a 3-shaft CODAG machinery suite, identical to that used in the Project 1124 corvettes. The middle shaft had an 18,000 hp (13,000 kW) gas turbine while the outer two shafts had diesel engines with 9,000 hp (6,700 kW) in total for economical cruising.

== Ships in class ==
Project 1159 - NATO reporting name Koni I
Name	Laid down	Launched	Commissioned	Fate
Del'fin	21 April 1973	19 July 1975	31 December 1975	in 1989 to Bulgarian Navy as Smeli in service 2014
Nerpa	22 October 1974	4 June 1977	31 December 1977	in 1978 to East Germany as Rostock, scrapped after 1990
Krechet	19 January 1977	3 July 1978	31 December 1978	in 1979 to East Germany as Berlin - Hauptstadt der DDR, scrapped after 1990
Sokol	January 1978	21 April 1979	30 November 1979	in 1980 to Yugoslavia as Split, later to Serbia & Montenegro, scrapped 2013
SKR-481	25 December 1979	24 December 1981	30 September 1982	in 1982 to Yugoslavia as Koper, scrapped 1998
SKR-149	8 April 1983	30 June 1984	25 June 1985	in 1985 to East Germany as Halle, scrapped after 1990
Project 1159T - NATO reporting name Koni II
SKR-482	10 June 1978	12 January 1980	30 September 1980	in 1980 to Algeria as Mourad Rais
SKR-28	17 July 1979	21 June 1980	30 December 1980	in 1981 to Cuba as Mariel
SKR-35	11 June 1980	30 April 1981	30 November 1981	in 1982 to Algeria as Rais Kellik, in service
SKR-471	24 April 1981	31 July 1982	17 August 1983	in 1984 to Cuba as 356
SKR-129	7 July 1982	11 November 1983	30 August 1984	in 1985 to Algeria as Rais Korfu, in service
SKR-451	6 May 1986	3 May 1987	25 December 1987	in 1988 to Cuba as Moncada
Project 1159TR - NATO reporting name Koni III
SKR-201	22 September 1982	27 April 1985	30 December 1985	in 1986 to Libya as Al Hani; in Malta for refit since 2013
SKR-195	18 April 1985	27 April 1986	25 December 1986	in 1987 to Libya as Al Ghardabia, sunk 2011 during the Libyan civil war

== Patrol Boat 383, P.B. ==
On July 16, 1998 the former Cuban Navy Koni II-class frigate designated 353 was scuttled in shallow water near the Cuban resort town of Varadero in the Parque Submarino Cayo Piedra del Norte as an attraction for divers. It is rumored that Fidel Castro promoted the project, being an avid diver himself. The frigate sank upright, and sits on the sand bottom in 90 ft (27 m) of water. For an unknown reason her hull number was changed from 353 to 383 prior to the scuttling. The dive operators in the Varadero area refer to the dive site as Patrol Boat 383 or simply P.B even though it is a frigate.

== Original operators ==
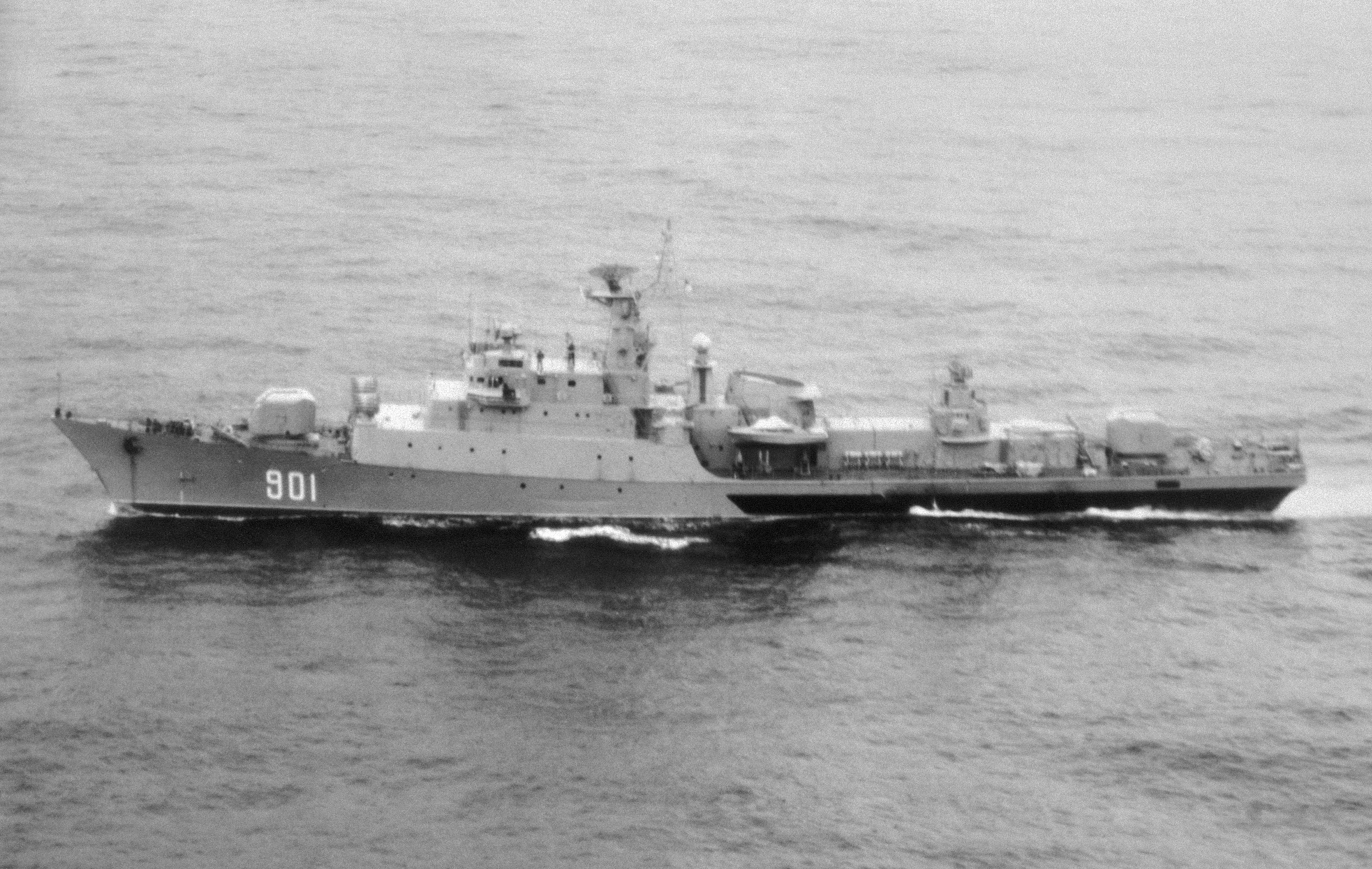
Mourad Rais of Algerian National Navy in 1986. One of the warm-water export versions.

- Soviet Union - 1 (to Bulgaria in 1990), Delfin was originally used for training foreign crews in the Black Sea, before being sold to the Bulgarian Navy, currently in service as Smeli (Bulgarian: Смели" ("Brave")).
- Algeria - 3, in service, being upgraded with new electronics, ASW torpedo tubes and 8 x Kh-35 Uran/SS-N-25 Switchblade anti-ship missiles
- Cuba - 3, 356 (No name) ex SKR-471 sunk as a reef, 353 (later 383) (Moncada) ex SKR-451 sunk as a reef and 350 (Mariel) ex SKR-28 status unknown.
- East Germany / Germany - 3, two (Rostock and Halle) taken over by unified German Navy and paid off August 1991, one (Berlin - Hauptstadt der DDR) immediately put up for disposal in 1991.
- Libya - 1 (formerly 2), 4 x 406mm torpedo tubes, status unknown, damaged by bombing May 19/20 and on August 9, 2011. (Al Ghardabia). The remaining ship, Al Hani captured by National Transitional Council in Benghazi, and has become the flagship of the reorganized Libyan Navy. She has been stuck in Malta for refit since 2013.
- Yugoslavia - acquired two ships, Split (VPBR-31) and Koper (VPBR-32), during the 1980s.

== See also ==
- List of ships of the Soviet Navy
- List of ships of Russia by project number
- List of frigate classes by country

Equivalent frigates of the same era

- Lupo class
- Wielingen class
- Type 21
- Type 053
- Almirante Padilla class
- Ulsan class
