= Algerian National Navy =

Algerian Naval Force
- ⵜⵔⴻⴷⵙⴰ ⵜⴰⴷⵣⴰⵢⵔⵉⵜ ⵏ ⵢⵉⵍⴻⵍ (Berber languages) القوات البحرية الجزائرية (Arabic); Forces Navales Algériennes (French)
- Algerian Naval badge
- Active: 1516–1827; 1963–present
- Country: Algeria
- Branch: Navy
- Role: Naval warfare
- Size: 15,000
- Part of: Algerian People's National Army
- Garrison/HQ: L'AMIRAUTE, Algiers
- Anniversaries: February 2, 1967
- Equipment: 213 vessels, 30 helicopters, 3 MPA Aircraft
- Website: www.mdn.dz/site_cfn/accueil_an.php

Commanders
- Current commander: Mahfoud Benmeddah
- Notable commanders: Chabane Ghodbane (1992–2000)

Insignia
- Naval Ensign

The Algerian Naval Force (Berber languages: ⵜⵔⴻⴷⵙⴰ ⵜⴰⴷⵣⴰⵢⵔⵉⵜ ⵏ ⵢⵉⵍⴻⵍ, ANF; Arabic: القوات البحرية الجزائرية, French: Forces Navales Algériennes) is the naval branch of the Algerian military. The naval force operates from multiple bases along the country's nearly 1,440 km (890 mi) coastline, fulfilling its primary role of monitoring and defending Algeria's territorial waters against all foreign military or economic intrusion. Additional missions include coast guard and maritime safety missions as well a projection of marine forces (fusiliers marins). Algerian forces are an important player in the Western Mediterranean. The Algerian navy ranks 15th globally in the world's most important naval forces report of 2023.

As with other Algerian military branches, the naval force was built and structured with assistance from the Soviet Union during the Cold War, but has also relied on other sources for equipment in some areas. Since the end of the Cold War, Russia has remained an important partner, but Algeria has increasingly sought additional sources for equipment as well as building its own shipbuilding capacity.

== Bases ==
Principal naval bases are located at Algiers, Annaba, Mers el-Kebir, Oran, Jijel and Tamentfoust. Mers el Kébir is home to the ECRN (Établissement de Construction et de Réparation Navales, formerly OMCN/CNE) shipbuilding facilities where several Algerian vessels have been built. Algeria's naval academy at Tamentfoust provides officer training equivalent to that of the army and the air force academies. The naval force also operates a technical training school for its personnel at Tamentfoust.

== Equipment ==
The bulk of the Algerian Naval Force is still based on Cold War designs, although work is being done to both acquire new platforms as well as modernize existing equipment. The surface fleet is equipped with a mixture of smaller ships well suited to coastal and Exclusive Economic Zone (EEZ) patrol work. The fleet is led by three Koni class frigates which have been updated with more modern systems. These are due to be augmented in the coming years by a pair of MEKO A-200 frigates which will represent the most modern equipment of the naval force when they enter service, also, Algeria signed a contract with China Shipbuilding Trading Company for the construction of three light frigates about 2,800 tons full load. A mixture of six corvettes and off-shore patrol vessels complement the frigates, while a large number of smaller boats cover the role of coastal patrol. Algeria had maintained a relatively large fleet of Osa class fast attack craft by the end of the Cold War, but it is questionable whether any of these remain in operational use.

Algeria has had a small submarine presence in the Mediterranean with a pair of Kilo class patrol submarines, Algeria is the only country in the region that can launch offensive missiles from a submarine, though the recent acquisition of an additional four upgraded boats will expand this presence significantly. Their amphibious warfare capacity has traditionally been limited with a small group of landing ships essentially for coastal transport roles. This capacity will be greatly upgraded with the planned acquisition of an amphibious transport dock capable of supporting more robust operations. In the area of civil support, the purchase of seagoing rescue tugs will mark the first ability of an African nation to provide valuable services to economic and commercial operators in the Western Mediterranean.

The Algerian military has long maintained a strong veil of secrecy over its organization and equipment, making an exact accounting of operational vessels difficult to ascertain. Open sources are known to vary widely in their reports of several aspects of Algerian equipment.

=== Submarines ===
| Class | Image | Origin | In service | Boat | Year Commissioned | Note |
Submarine (6)
| Project 636.1 | | Russia | 4 | Messali el Hadj (021); Akram Pacha (022); El Ouarsenis (031); El Hoggar (032) | 2010–2019 | The first pair were ordered in mid-2006 and delivered in 2010-2011. The second pair were ordered by June 2014 and commissioned in January 2019. |
| Project 877EKM | Rais Hadj Mubarek | Soviet Union | 2 | Rais Hadj Mubarek (012); El Hadj Slimane (013) | 1987–1988 | These boats commissioned in 1986 and 1987. They were refitted from 1993 to 1996, and 2005 to 2012. |

=== Amphibious warfare vessels ===
| Class | Image | Origin | In service | Ship | Displacement | Year Commissioned | Note |
Amphibious transport dock (1)
| San Giorgio class | | Italy | 1 | Kalaat Béni Abbès | 9,000 tonnes | 2015 | Improved San Giorgio, Ordered in 2011(+1 in option)' |
Landing ships (2)
| Kalaat Beni Hammed | | United Kingdom | 2 | Kalaat Beni Hammed | 2,450 tonnes | 1984 | Built by Brooke Marine in Lowestoft, UK |
| Kalaat Beni Hammed | | United Kingdom | 2 | Kalaat Beni Rached | 2,450 tonnes | 1984 | Built by Vosper Thornycroft in Woolston, UK |

=== Surface combatants ===
| Class | Image | Origin | In service | Ship | Displacement | Year Commissioned | Note |
Frigates (8)
| MEKO A200 | | Germany | 2 | Erradii; El Moudamir | 3,700 tonnes | 2016-2018 | Two in service with the option for two more. |
| Adhafer class | 353 El Kirch | China | 3 | Adhafer; El Fatih; Ezzadjer | 2,880 tonnes | 2015–2016 | Armed with NG-16-1 (76 mm) main gun, 2 seven-barrel 30 mm Type 730 CIWS, 2 quad C-802 missiles. |
| Koni class | | Soviet Union | 3 | Mourad Rais; Rais Kellik; Rais Korfou | 2,000 tonnes | 1980–1985 | Modernized in Russia in 2011. |
Corvettes (8)
| Nanuchka class | 802 Salah Rais | Soviet Union | 3 | Ras Hamidou; Salah Reis; Reis Ali | 660 tonnes | 1982 | In service, Project 1234E built by Vympel Shipyard in Rybinsk, modernized in 2012. |
| Djebel Chenoua class | | Algeria | 4 | Djebel Chenoua; El Chihab; El Kirch; Hassan Barbiear | 540 tonnes | 1988–2017 | Built by OMCN / CNE in Mers-el-Kebir, Algeria. Armed with 4 C802 ASM and AK630 CIWS. |
| Type 056 class | | China | 1 | El Moutassadi | 1,500 tonnes | 2023 | Unconfirmed reports that six were ordered. |
Mine countermeasures (3)
| Lerici class | | Italy | 3 | | 600 tonnes | 2016–2021 | |
Patrol boats (75)
| Osa II-class missile boat | | Soviet Union | 8 | | | 1978 | |
| Kebir-class patrol boat | | United Kingdom | 14 | El Yadekh | 250 tonnes | 1982 | The first two units built by Brooke Marine. |
| FPB98 MKI Ocea-class patrol boat | | France | 41 | Denebi | | 2008-2021 | Built by Ocea France. |
| Alusafe 2000 | | Spain; Algeria | 12 | El Mounkid | | 2016 | Produced locally. |

=== Fleet auxiliaries ===
| Class | Image | Origin | No. | Ship | Displacement | Year Commissioned | Note |
Survey ship
| El Idrissi | | Japan | 673 | El Idrissi | 540 tonnes | 1980 | Built by Matsukara Zosen in Hirao, Japan. |
| OSV-95 | | France | 205 | El Masseh | | 2021 | Built by Ocea shipyards, France. |
Training ship
| Soummam | Soummam | China | 937 | Soummam | 5,500 tonnes | 2006 | 5,500 tons (full load). |
| El Mellah | | Poland | 938 | El Mellah (the sailor) | | 2017 | A three-masted tall ship constructed in Gdańsk, Poland. |
Salvage ship
| El Mourafik | | China | 261 | El Mourafik | 600 tonnes | 1990 | Built in China. |
High seas tow vessel
| El Mounjid | | Norway | 701 | El Mounjid | 3,200 tonnes | 2012 | Type UT 515 CD built in Norway and Motorization by Rolls-Royce. |
| El Mounjid | | Norway | 702 | El Moussif | 3,200 tonnes | 2012 | Type UT 515 CD built in Norway and Motorization by Rolls-Royce. |
| El Mounjid | | Norway | 703 | El Moussanid | 3,200 tonnes | 2012 | Type UT 515 CD built in Norway and Motorization by Rolls-Royce. |

=== Aircraft ===
| Aircraft | Image | Origin | Type | Variant | In service | Notes |
Helicopters
| Westland Super Lynx | | United Kingdom | ASW | 130/140 | 10 | |
| AgustaWestland AW101 | | United Kingdom; Italy | SAR / utility | | 5 | |
| AgustaWestland AW139 | | Italy | light utility | | 3 | |

=== Modernization ===
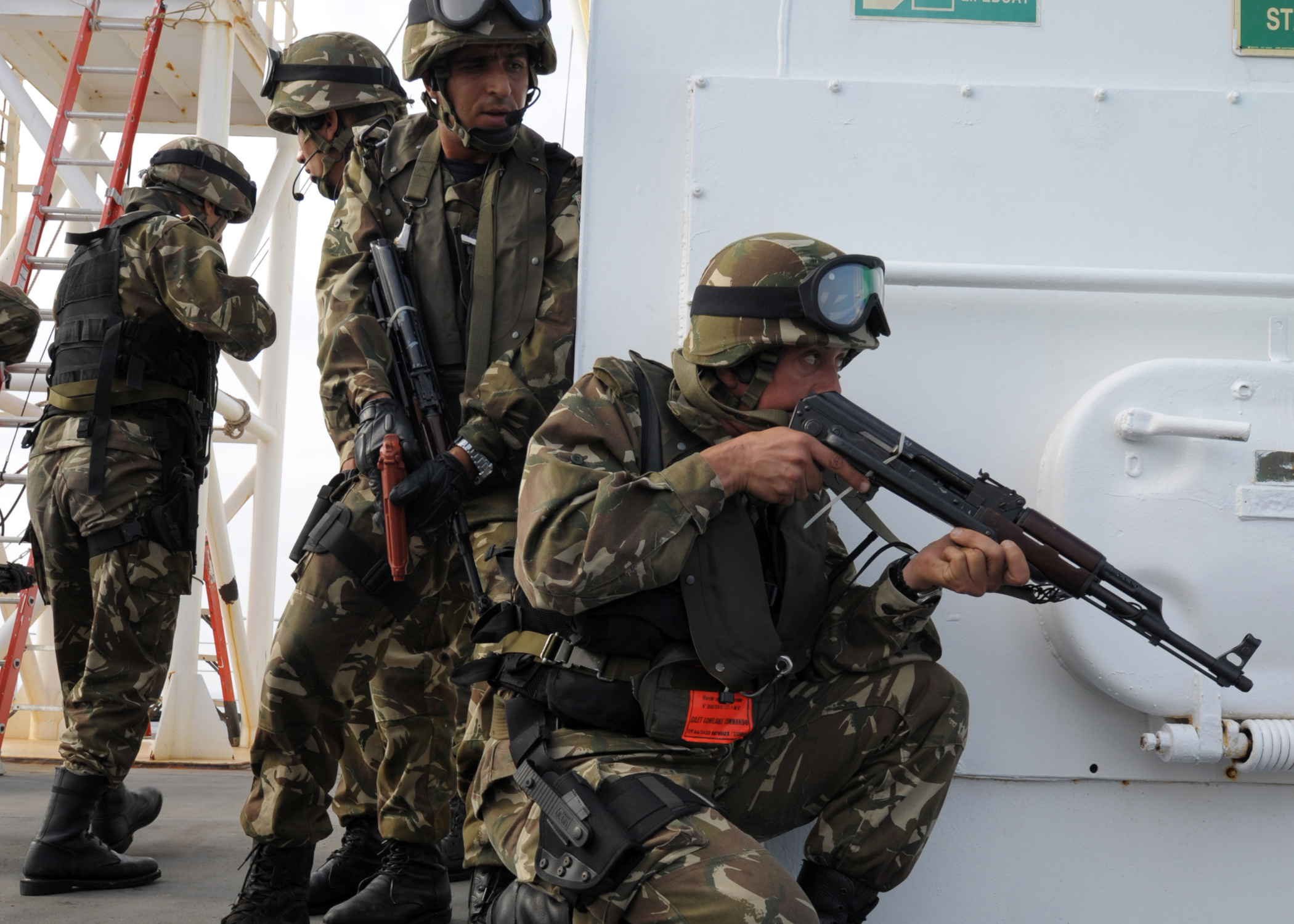
Algerian Sailors conduct Maritime Interdiction Operations (MIO).

The Naval force is currently being upgraded with the following technological developments: the existing units are being modernized, with the submarine force strengthened by two new Kilo class submarines (last generation).

- One LPD from Italy in 2014.
- Two MEKO A200 frigates from Germany.
- TYPE 054A frigates
- AIP Submarines
- Three corvettes C28A with option of three more produced locally. Radar and electronic equipment will be supplied by Thales, and mounted in Algeria. They will be built at Hudong Zhonghua Shipyard.
- 31 units of the type FPB98 MKI Ocean Patrol Boat.
- 12 units of Alusafe 2000 high speed rescue and patrol vessel.

== Munitions ==
=== Surface-to-air missiles ===
- Umkhonto (missile)
- Aster (missile family)
- HQ-7A (FM-90) - on board C28A Class Corvette .
- HQ-10 - on board Type 056 corvette
- 9M33/SA-8 - Osa-M (SA-N-4) naval version for Koni (Mourad Rais) frigate

=== Anti-ship missiles ===
- 3M14E or 3M54E1/E Klub-S - Project 636.1 "Improved Kilo"
- 4K51 Rubezh ("Styx") - Coastal defense
- C-802
- C-802A
- CM-302 – Coastal defense; delivered in 2022.
- Kh-31M – 125 delivered in 2009
- Kh-35 - 60 delivered in 2000 and 2013.
- Kh-59 - 125 delivered in 2009.
- P-20U ("Styx")
- RBS-15 Mk. III - Erradii-class frigates

=== Air-to-ground missiles ===
- Raptor-2 - Guided bomb from South Africa

== Ranks ==
=== Commissioned officer ranks ===
The rank insignia of commissioned officers.

| Rank group | General / flag officers | | | | Senior officers | | | Junior officers |
|---|---|---|---|---|---|---|---|---|---|---|
| Algerian National Navy |
| Algerian National Navy | فريق أول; Fariq 'awal | فريق; Fariq | لواء; Liwa | عميد; Amid | عقيد; Aqid | مقدم; Muqaddam | رائد; Ra'id | نقيب; Naqib | ملازم أول; Mulazim awwal | ملازم; Mulazim |
| Algerian National Navy | Général d'armée | Général de corps d'armée | Général major | Général | Colonel | Lieutenant-colonel | Commandant | Capitaine | Lieutenant | Sous-lieutenant |

=== Other ranks ===
The rank insignia of non-commissioned officers and enlisted personnel.

| Rank group | Senior NCOs | | | | Junior NCOs | | Enlisted |
|---|---|---|---|---|---|---|---|
| Algerian National Navy | | | | | | | No insignia |
| Algerian National Navy | مساعد أول; Mosa'id awwal | مساعد; Mosa'id | رقيب أول; Raqib awwal | رقيب; Raqib | عريف أول; Earif 'awal | عريف; Earif | جندي; Jundiun |
| Algerian National Navy | Adjudant chef | Adjudant | Sergent chef | Sergent | Caporal chef | Caporal | Djoundi |

== See also ==
- List of Algerian ships
