= Djebel Chenoua-class corvette =

Algerian navy ship

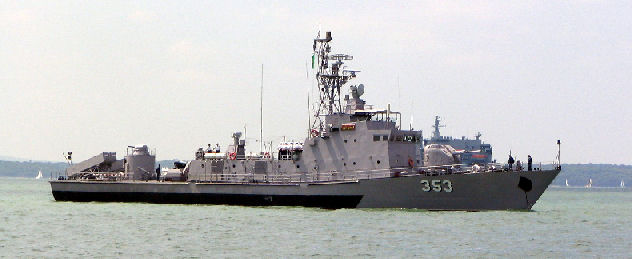
- Algerian Navy corvette El Kirch

Class overview
- Builders: ECRN Mers el Kebir
- Operators: Algerian National Navy
- In service: 1980–present
- Completed: 4
- Active: 4

General characteristics
- Type: Corvette
- Displacement: 550 tons (full load)
- Length: 58.40 m (191.6 ft)
- Beam: 8.50 m (27.9 ft)
- Draught: 2.59 m (8.5 ft)
- Propulsion: 3 × MTU 20V-538-TB92 diesels; 3 × shafts
- Speed: 31 knots (57 km/h)
- Range: 1.000 Nmi (1.852 km)
- Boats & landing craft carried: Rigid-hulled inflatable boat
- Complement: 52 (including 6 officers)
- Sensors & processing systems: Radar: Attack radar Type 363A/S; Acquisition radar Type 374G
- Electronic warfare & decoys: Countermeasures; 2 × Decoy launchers.
- Armament: Guns: 1 × AK-176 (76 mm); 1 × AK-630 (6 barrels × 30 mm) CIWS; Missiles: 4 × C-802 active radar homing to 120km at (Mach 0.9); Fire control: Optronic director Type 88C

The Djebel Chenoua-class corvettes are ships of Algerian design and assembly, developed in the shipyards of Mers el-Kebir near Oran and built in the 1980s. The 4 units are specialized in anti-ship warfare and search and rescue operations.

== Design ==
All four ships are now equipped with four C-802 missiles made in China. The missile was derived from the French Exocet, has a 120 km range and an automatic guidance system. The ships are armed with a Russian AK-176 76 mm main gun with a high rate of fire installed at the bow and a Gatling-type AK-630 30 mm air defense gun installed aft.

== Ships ==
Name	Pennant number	Ship builder	Launched	Commissioned	Fate
Djebel Chenoua	351	ECRN, Mers-el-Kebir	3 February 1985	November 1988	In service
El Chihab	352	ECRN, Mers-el-Kebir	February 1990	June 1995	In service
El Kirch	353	ECRN, Mers-el-Kebir	July 2000	2002	In service
Hassan Barbiear	807	ECRN, Mers-el-Kebir	2017	2017	In service
