= Adhafer-class corvette =

Class of stealth corvette for the Algerian Navy

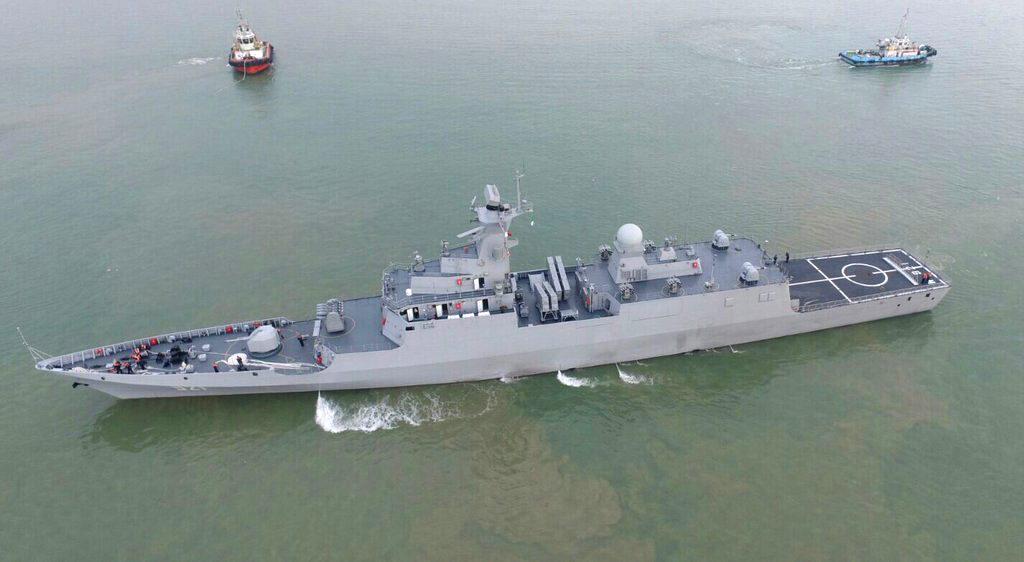
- El Fateh

Class overview
- Builders: CSSC
- Operators: Algerian National Navy
- In service: 2016
- Planned: 6
- Completed: 3
- Active: 3

General characteristics
- Type: Corvette
- Displacement: 2,880 tons standard, 3,000 tons full load
- Length: 120 m (390 ft)
- Beam: 14.4 m (47 ft)
- Draught: 3.87 m (12.7 ft)
- Propulsion: 4 × MTU-1163 16V diesel engines; 4 × Mecmar exhaust gas system
- Speed: 30 knots (56 km/h)
- Boats & landing craft carried: Rigid-hulled inflatable boat
- Sensors & processing systems: Radar: Smart-S Mk2 3D Radar; Type 364 Air search radar; 2 × Kelvin Hughes navigation radars.
- Electronic warfare & decoys: ESM; 2 × Type 726-4 Decoy launcher system.
- Armament: Guns: 1 × NG-16-1(76 mm) Main Gun; 2 × Seven-barrel 30 mm Type-730 CIWS.; Missiles: 2 × Quad C-802 active radar homing Launchers up to 280km at (Mach 0.9); 1 × 8-Cell FM90N launcher for HQ-7 naval short-range air defence missiles.; Fire control: 1 × Type 345 fire-control radar; 2 × Type 347 fire-control radar.; Anti-submarine warfare: 2 × Triple 324mm torpedo launchers.
- Aircraft carried: Super-Lynx Mk140
- Aviation facilities: Flight Deck; Hangar

The Adhafer-class corvette is a type of stealth corvette belonging to the Algerian Navy. They are built in China by China State Shipbuilding Corporation CSSC in its Hudong-Zhonghua shipyard in Shanghai. The ship is 120 metres (393 ft 8 in) long and 14.4 metres (47 ft 3 in) wide and has a standard displacement of 2,880 tons. Three Adhafer-class ships were commissioned, with an option for three others of the same type. The first unit was launched on 15 August 2014 and commissioned in November 2015. The second and third were both commissioned in 2016.

== Design ==
The displacement of the Adhafer-class corvette is about 2,880 tons standard and 3,000 tons full load. The propulsion system consists of four MTU diesel engines.

The ship features a "low point" design and combines this with radar absorbing paint to reduce radar signature. In a departure from existing designs, there is no funnel stack. Instead, the diesels exhaust near the waterline to minimise infrared signatures. Top speed is expected to be around 30 knots (56 km/h; 35 mph). The hull has two sets of fin stabilisers as well as bilge keels.

=== Combat system ===
The Adhafer class's combat system is largely Chinese with the exception of the Thales Smart-S Mk2, associated multifunction operator consoles (MOC)/Tacticos cluster, Link Y datalinks, and associated consoles. Four or so MOC for the Smart-S are integrated with a CSTC-supplied combat management system (CMS).

=== Armament ===
The ships are equipped with an Italian 76 mm NG-16-1 naval cannon as their main gun, inside a turret with a reduced radar cross-section design. They may engage surface targets as well as aircraft.

The Adhafer class carries HQ-7 naval short-range air defence missiles in eight-cell FM90 launcher. The missile's operating altitude is 15~6,000 m and a range of 700 m to 15 km, it offers combined guidance by command and electro-optical tracking.

The ship also carries C-802A anti-ship missiles in two quad launchers, which can target ships within the range of 280 km, and two triple 324 mm torpedo launchers. Two seven-barrel 30 mm Type 730 CIWS, both mounted atop the hangar, provide close-in defence. Each gun has a maximum rate of fire of 4,600~5,800 rounds/min.

=== Electronic countermeasures ===
The digital and solid state Type 726-4 decoy launcher system is mounted on the side of the ship and consists of two launchers. Each launcher has 18 tubes arranged in three six-tube rows. Firing is typically controlled automatically by the combat data system, but a manual control console is also provided.

The primary role of the Type 726-4 is to launch chaff and decoys. However, atypically, it may also fire ASW rockets (against submarines, torpedoes, and frogmen), and can also be used for shore bombardment.

The Adhafer-class corvette also carries an ESM system.

=== Sensors ===
The ships are equipped with Smart-S Mk2 medium to long-range air and surface surveillance 3D multibeam PESA radar designed by Thales Nederland, with a maximum range of 250 km. Two navigation radars - an I-band (X-band) set and an E/F-band (S-band) set - that are thought to be Kelvin Hughes SharpEye radars. In addition of Type 364 targeting and secondary air search radar. One Type 345 fire-control radar system used to guide the FM90N missiles. Two Type 347 fire-control radars control the Type 730 CIWS. They are also equipped with a hull-mounted sonar of Chinese origin.

== Ships ==
| Name | Pennant number | Ship builder | Launched | Commissioned | Fate |
|---|---|---|---|---|---|
| Adhafer | 920 | CSSC, Hudong-Zhonghua Shipbuilding, Shanghai, China | 15 August 2014 | November 2015 | Active |
| El Fateh | 921 | CSSC, Hudong-Zhonghua Shipbuilding, Shanghai, China | 6 February 2015 | 10 March 2016 | Active |
| Ezzadjer | 922 | CSSC, Hudong-Zhonghua Shipbuilding, Shanghai, China | | August 2016 | Active |

=== New version ===
On 22 November 2016, the 9th IDEAS (International Defense Exhibition and Seminar) opens its doors at the Karachi Exhibition Center in Pakistan. In the Chinese pavilion, the Chinese naval group CSSC came up with the model of a new stealth frigate that would be called C28A. Brings together a radar with AESA quad faces and a part of sensors of the building, complemented by a second located just behind and equipped with systems of watch and EW diversified. This is the most notable point of this frigate proposed by the CSSC. These two PJ-12B model gun CIWS mounted at the rear of the old C28A hangar are now positioned a little further forward but still remain above the hangar. The whole is reinforced by the new CIWS missile FL-3000N of 15 or 24 tubes, whose missiles are equipped with a search head of mixed guidance in passive radar and infrared.

"Hard Kill" for the anti-aircraft defense have been greatly improved compared to the old model. Other views extracted from a CCTV report show that the "new" C28A keeps its 8 anti-ship missiles on Launch ramp, which could be either the C802A or the C803. A standard lure maker that resembles the Model 726-4 is installed on each side.
