= CEROS 200 fire control radar =

Swedish fire control radar

CEROS 200
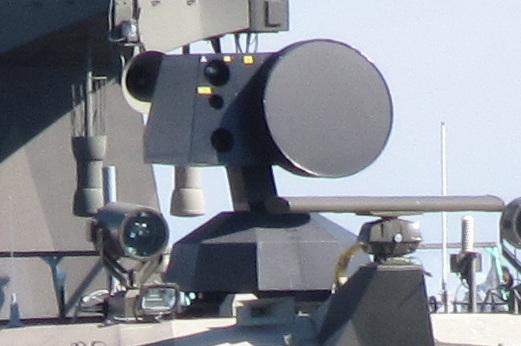
- CEROS 200 fire control radar
- Country of origin: Sweden
- Type: Fire control
- Frequency: Ku band

CEROS 200 (CElsius tech Radar and Optronic Site) is a radar and optronic tracking fire control director designed by Saab for use along with the 9LV naval fire control system (FCS) on naval ships. When interfaced to modern missile or gun systems it provides defence against any modern threat including advanced sea skimming missiles or asymmetric surface threats in littoral environments.

== Features ==
The radar design incorporates many electronic counter-countermeasures:

- Very low antenna side lobes
- Very wide bandwidth
- A large number of transmit frequencies
- Random selection of frequency
- Lock on jam, track on jam

Unlike other fire control radars, the CEROS 200 can guide 2 missiles, like the ESSM, at once.

== Accuracy ==
The CEROS 200 director provides 3D tracking. This enables the operator to deal with advanced air and surface threats. FCS firing accuracy as measured by an independent agency in a range of conditions:

Within 1 meter (radius): 36%

1–2 meter (radius): 23%

2–4 meter (radius): 19%

4–6 meter (radius): 22%

== Specifications ==
Tracking radar

- Frequency range: Ku-band, 15.5-17.5 GHz
- Pulse Compressor: Frequency coded

Transmitter

- Type: Grid-pulse helix TWT
- Output power: 1.5 kW peak 4 percent duty cycle
- Number of frequencies: More than 100
- Transmission patterns : Pulse Doppler: 32-pulse batches
- MTI : 4-pulse batches
- Frequency agility: pulse-to-pulse frequency agility

Director pedestal

- Type: 2-axis, elevation over azimuth
- Angular speed: 2 rad/s
- Angular acceleration: 10 rad/s2

Dimension and weight

- Height above deck: Approximately 2 meters
- Diameter: Approximately 1.6 meters
- Weight: 625–750 kg depending on version
