= Zelenodolsk Shipyard =

Russian shipbuilding company

Coordinates: 55.837°N 48.504°E

JSC Zelenodolsk Plant named after A.M. Gorky
- Native name: Russian: ОАО Зеленодольский завод им. А.М. Горького
- Company type: Open joint-stock company (OJSC)
- Industry: Shipbuilding, defence
- Founded: 1895; 131 years ago
- Headquarters: Zelenodolsk, Tatarstan, Russia
- Area served: Worldwide
- Key people: Sergei Valerievich Ilin (Chairman); Renat Iskanderovich Mistakhov (CEO)
- Revenue: $551 million (2017)
- Parent: Ak Bars Holding
- Website: www.zdship.ru

JSC Zelenodolsk Shipyard is a shipbuilding company based in Zelenodolsk, Tatarstan, Russia. It is part of the Ak Bars Holding.

== History ==
Zelenodolsk Plant became an important military shipbuilder when equipment was evacuated there from the western USSR early in World War II and the yard began building Artillerist-class submarine chasers.

After the war, the shipyard specialized in building submarine chaser and small escort ship classes designed by its collocated design bureau, including the Kronshtadt, SO-1, Poti, and Grisha classes. Following expansion of the yard in the early 1970s, Zelenodolsk Plant produced the larger escorts of the Koni class, which was intended exclusively for export. The Koni class was succeeded by the Gepard class.

Zelenodolsk Plant also built the large missile-armed surface effect ships of the Dergach class (designed by the Almaz Central Marine Design Bureau in St. Petersburg), as well as some naval auxiliaries. It has generally also had at least one civilian ship type in production, including Zelenodolsk-class river tugs in the 1950s, Meteor-type passenger hydrofoils (designed in Nizhniy Novgorod) and Caspian Sea trawlers during the 1960s, and 3,700-ton Tatarstan-class refrigerator ships for the fishing industry in the 1970s.

== Sanctions ==
On March 15, 2019, the plant was added to the US sanctions list.

On March 15, 2022, against the background of Russian invasion of Ukraine, the plant was included in the sanctions lists of the European Union and the United Kingdom. On May 3, was sanctioned by New Zealand, on May 6, was sanctioned by Canada.

The Zelenodolsk Shipyard is also under sanctions from Switzerland, Ukraine and Japan.
