= Zelenodolsk, Republic of Tatarstan =

Town in Tatarstan, Russia

Zelenodolsk Зеленодольск
- Town

Other transcription(s)
  - Tatar: Яшел Үзән
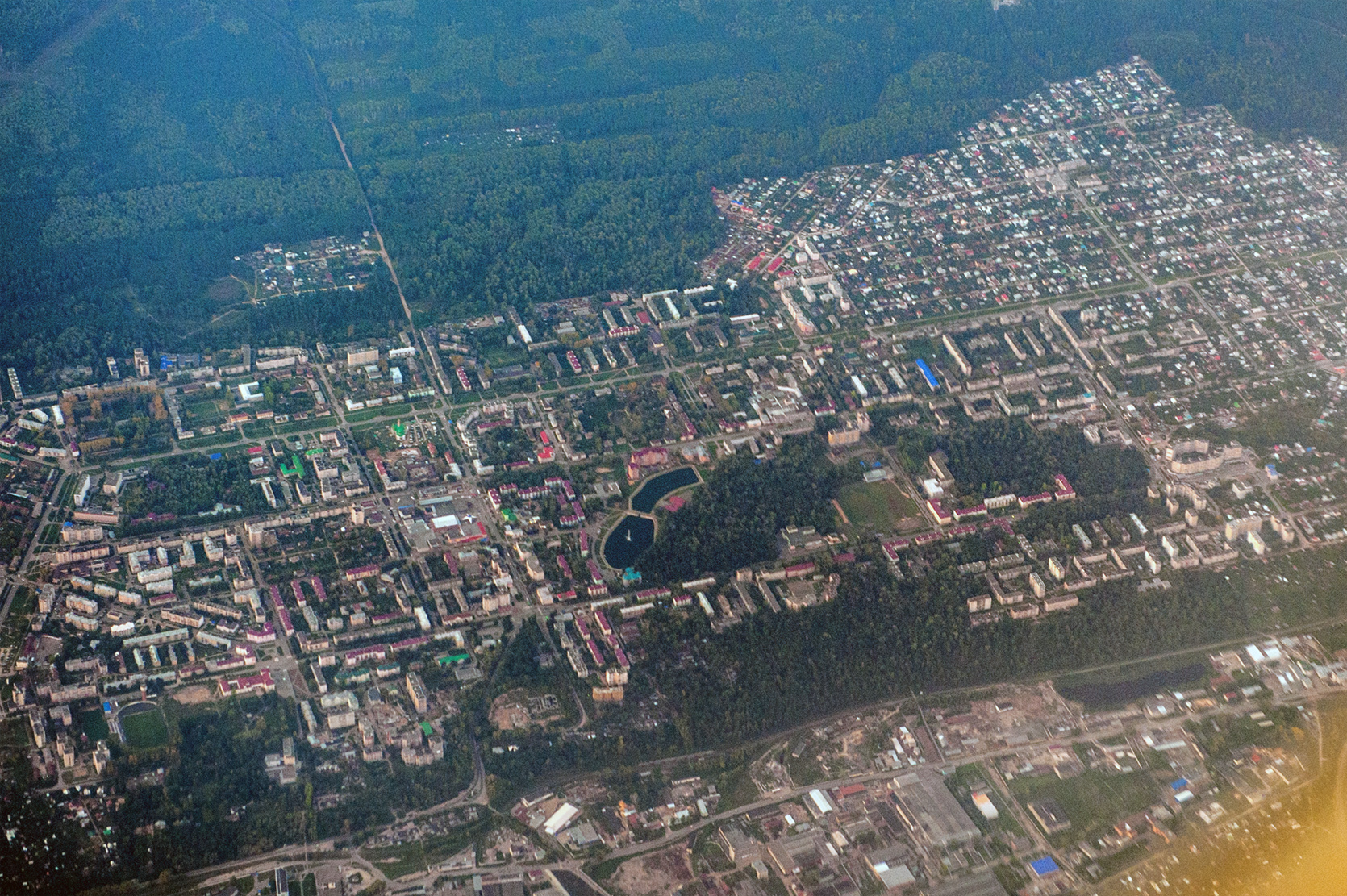
- Aerial view of Zelenodolsk

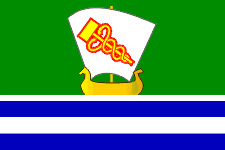
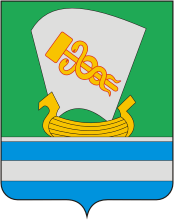
- Flag Coat of arms
- Interactive map of Zelenodolsk
- Location of Zelenodolsk Zelenodolsk (Tatarstan)
- Coordinates: 55°51′N 48°31′E
- Country: Russia
- Federal subject: Tatarstan
- Founded: 1865
- Town status since: 1932
- Elevation: 90 m (300 ft)

Population (2010 Census)
  - Total: 97,674
  - Estimate (2025): 98,791 (+1.1%)
  - Rank: 173rd in 2010

Administrative status
  - Subordinated to: town of republic significance of Zelenodolsk
  - Capital of: town of republic significance of Zelenodolsk, Zelenodolsky District

Municipal status
  - Municipal district: Zelenodolsky Municipal District
  - Urban settlement: Zelenodolsk Urban Settlement
  - Capital of: Zelenodolsky Municipal District, Zelenodolsk Urban Settlement
- Time zone: UTC+3 (MSK)
- Postal codes: 422540–422542, 422544–422546, 422548–422551, 422559
- Dialing code: +7 84371
- OKTMO ID: 92628101001

Zelenodolsk (Russian: Зеленодо́льск; Tatar: Яшел Үзән; Mari: Парат) is a town in Tatarstan, Russia, located in the northwest of the republic on the left bank of the Volga River, 38 kilometers (24 mi) from Kazan. Population: 97,674 (2010 census); 100,139 (2002 census); 94,079 (1989 Soviet census).

== History ==
The city stands on the site of Mari village. In 1865, the town was referred to as the village Kabachischi (the title area of arable land Paratsky peasants "Kabachischenskie field"). Since 1897 the village was called Paratsky Zaton, and since 1928 working village Green Dol. In 1932, transformed into a city Zelenodol'sk.

Since the end of the 19th century, it was the backwater wintering area and repair of sea vessels, which marked the beginning Zelenodolsk Shipyard (now Zelenodolsky Plant Gorky).

As a result of the rising water level of the Kuibyshev Reservoir and coastal flooding during construction of the Kuibyshev hydroelectric station, the coastline has changed dramatically.

A major public-private investment project is under way to create new satellite city, "Zelyony Dol" (Green Dol), by 2025 on approximately 3,640 hectares within the Kazan agglomeration along the M-7 motorway between Zelenodolsk and Kazan. The planned settlement is projected to house an initial population of 100,000 (later rising to 157,000), with a housing stock of 4.1 million m² and an estimated construction cost of 140 billion rubles. Development is expected to consist predominantly of low-rise buildings transitioning to multi-storey structures, beginning from the planned Zelenodolsk neighbourhood "Volzhskaya Venetsiya" (Volga Venice) on reclaimed semi-marsh lands near Aysha and continuing through Orekhovka.

== Administrative and municipal status ==
Within the framework of administrative divisions, Zelenodolsk serves as the administrative center of Zelenodolsky District, even though it is not a part of it. As an administrative division, it is incorporated separately as the town of republic significance of Zelenodolsk—an administrative unit with the status equal to that of the districts. As a municipal division, the town of republic significance of Zelenodolsk is incorporated within Zelenodolsky Municipal District as Zelenodolsk Urban Settlement.

== Economy ==
Due to its location, Zelenodolsk is an important transport hub of the republic. It also has a well-known shipbuilding yard (Zelenodolsk Factory), founded in 1895.

During the Cold War, Zelenodolsk was a secret development base for warships.

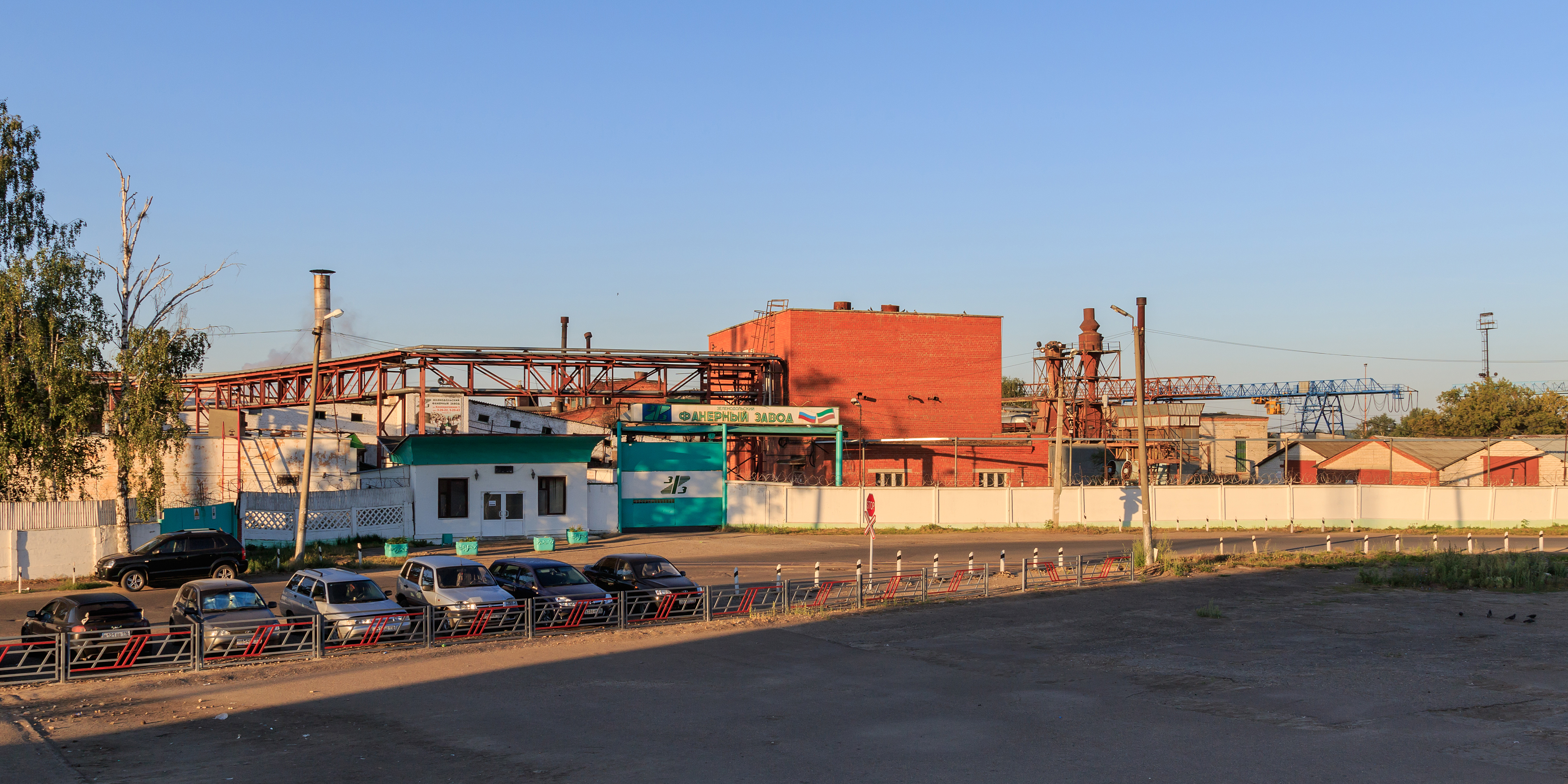
Plywood factory in Zelenodolsk

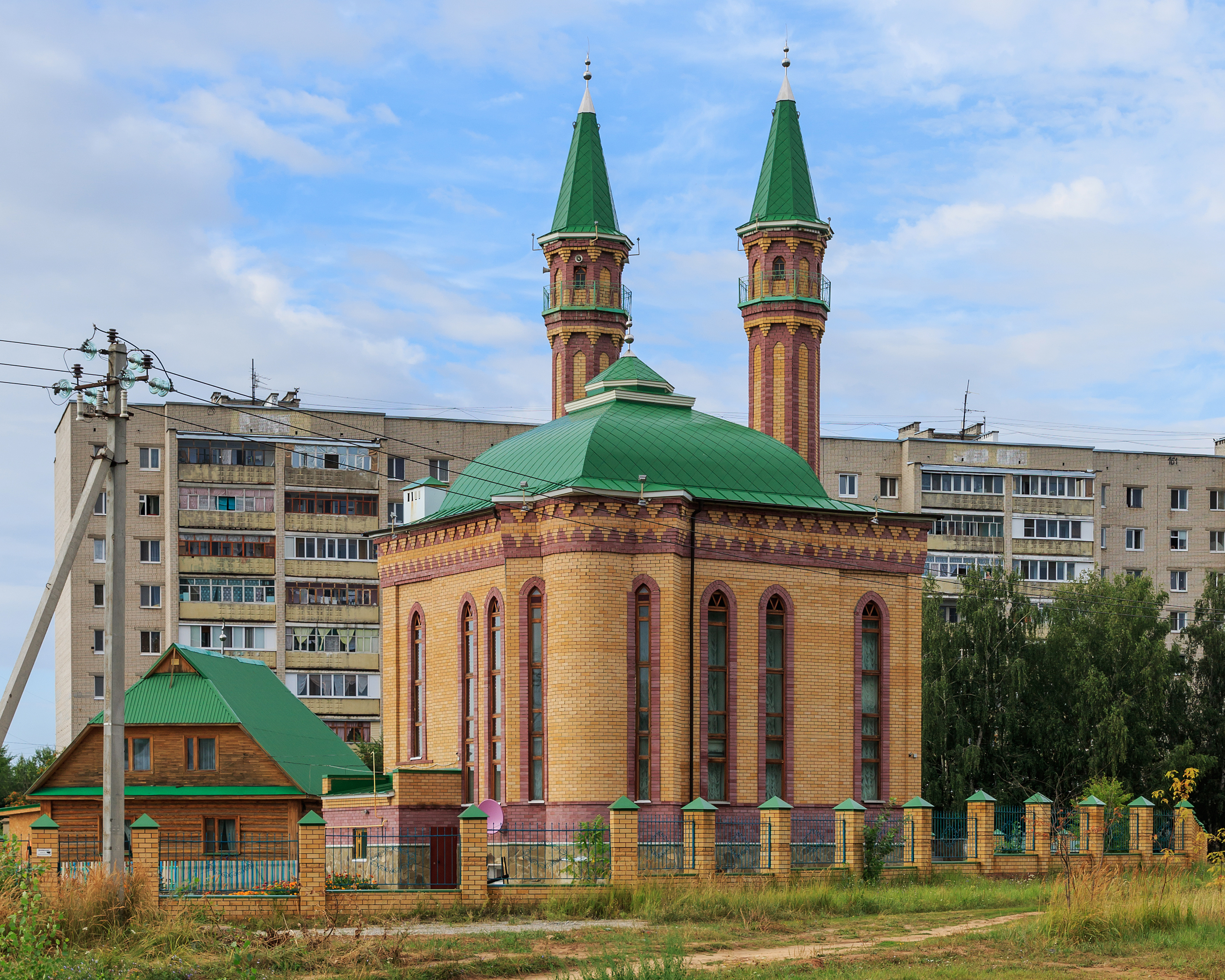
Tynychlyk Mosque

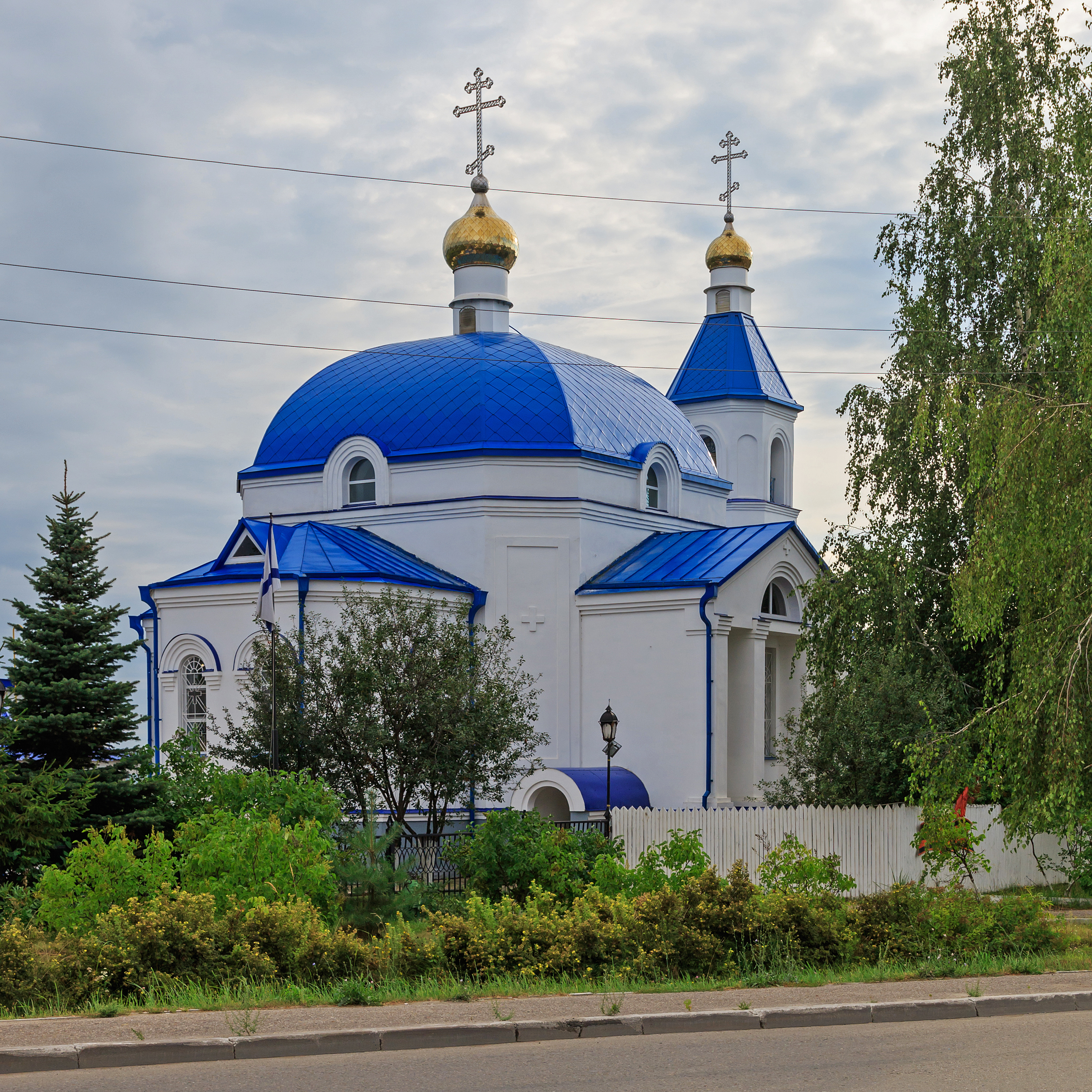
Saint Andrew Church

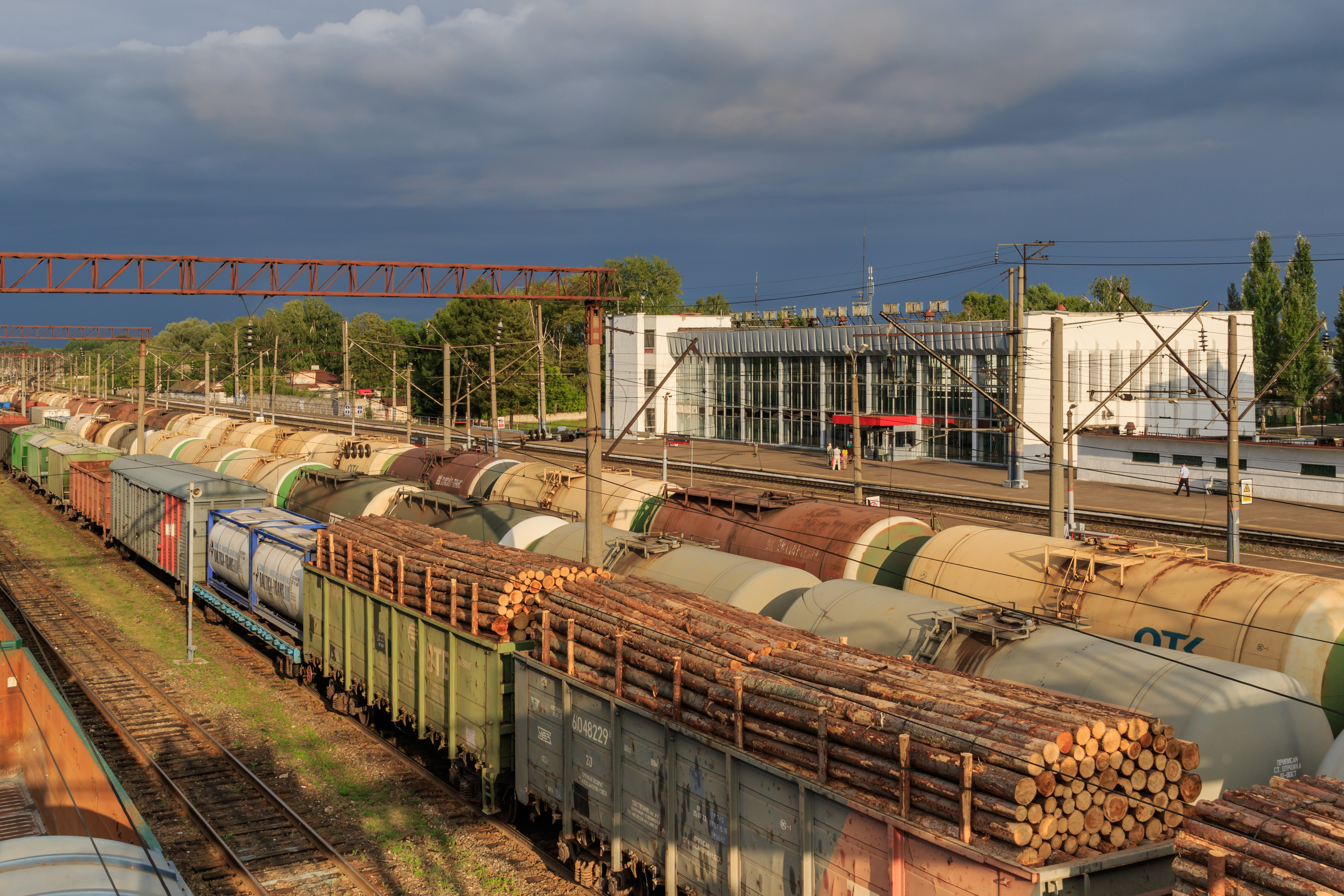
Freight trains at Zeleny Dol station

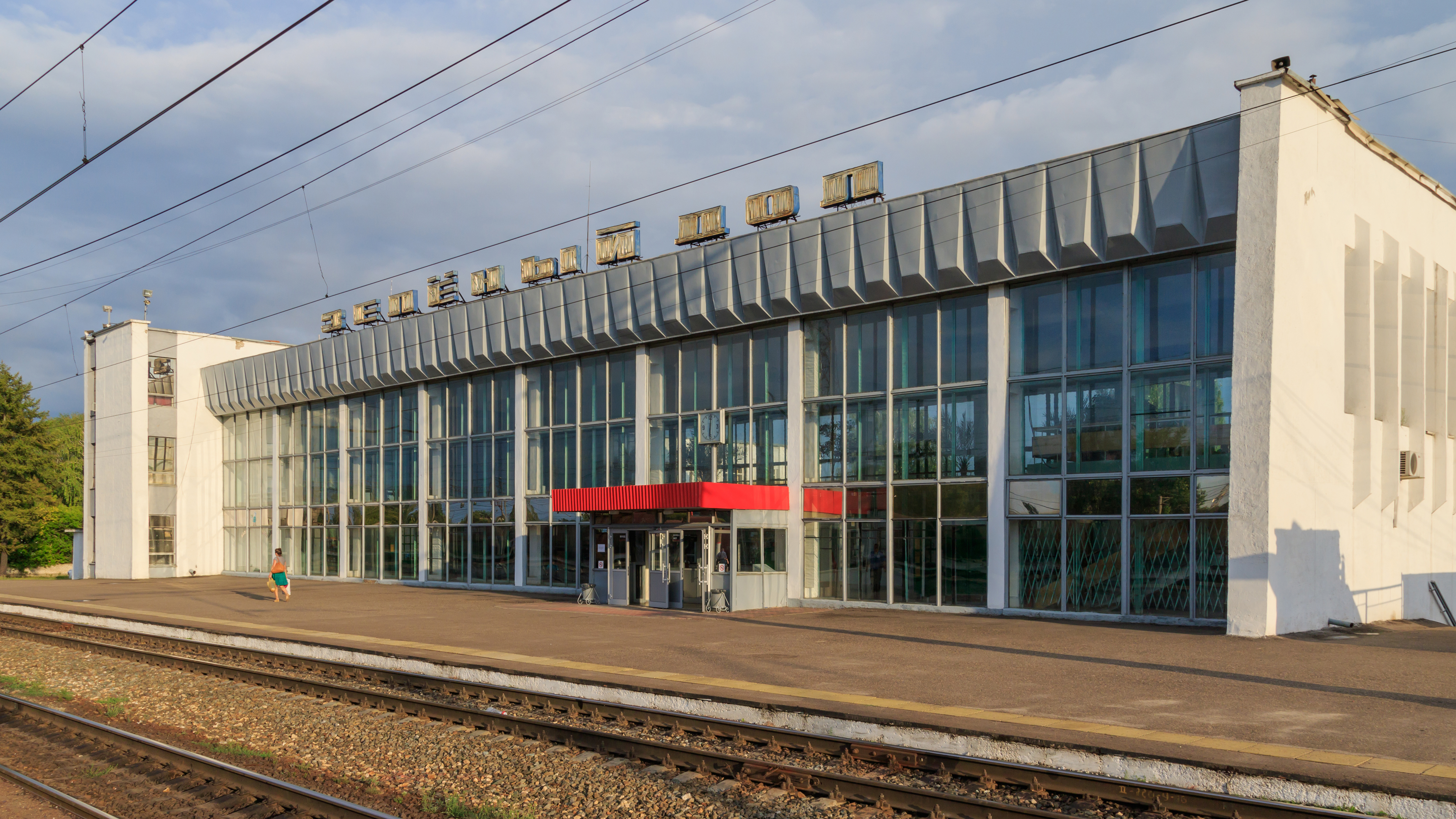
Building of Zeleny Dol station
