= Combined diesel and gas =

Compression-ignition engine plus turbine connected to one drive shaft

Principle of a CODAG system, with two speed diesel gearboxes

Combined diesel and gas (CODAG) is a type of propulsion system for ships that need a maximum speed that is considerably faster than their cruise speed, particularly warships like modern frigates or corvettes.

Pioneered by Germany with the Köln-class frigate, a CODAG system consists of diesel engines for cruising and gas turbines that can be switched on for high-speed transits. In most cases the difference of power output from diesel engines alone to diesel and turbine power combined is too large for controllable-pitch propellers to limit the rotations so that the diesels cannot continue to operate without changing the gear ratios of their transmissions. Because of that, special multi-speed gearboxes are needed. This contrasts to combined diesel or gas (CODOG) systems, which couple the diesels with a simple, fixed ratio gearbox to the shaft, but disengage the diesel engines when the turbine is powered up.

For an example the new CODAG-propelled Fridtjof Nansen-class frigates of the Royal Norwegian Navy, the gear ratio for the diesel engine is changed from about 1:7.7 (engine:propeller) for diesel-only to 1:5.3 when in diesel-and-turbine mode. Some ships even have three different gear ratios for the diesel engines — one each for single-diesel and double-diesel cruises, and the third when the gas turbine is engaged.

Such a propulsion system has a smaller footprint than a diesel-only power plant with the same maximal power output, since smaller engines can be used and the gas turbine and gearbox don't need that much additional space. Still, it retains the high fuel efficiency of diesel engines when cruising, allowing greater range and lower fuel costs than with gas turbines alone. On the other hand, a more complex, heavy and troublesome gearing is needed.

Typical cruising speed of CODAG warships on diesel-power is 20 kn (37 km/h; 23 mph) and typical maximal speed with switched on turbine is 30 kn (56 km/h; 35 mph).

== Turbines and diesels on separate shafts ==
Combined marine propulsion
| Combined diesel or gas | (CODOG) |
| Combined diesel and gas | (CODAG) |
| Combined diesel–electric and diesel | (CODLAD) |
| Combined diesel–electric and gas | (CODLAG) |
| Combined diesel and diesel | (CODAD) |
| Combined steam and gas | (COSAG) |
| Combined gas or gas | (COGOG) |
| Combined gas and gas | (COGAG) |
| Combined gas and steam | (COGAS) |
| Combined nuclear and steam | (CONAS) |
| Integrated electric propulsion | (IEP or IFEP) |

Sometimes the engine arrangement of diesel engine and gas turbine with each system using its own shafts and propellers is also called CODAG. Such installations avoid the use of a complicated switching gearbox, but have some disadvantages compared to real CODAG systems:

- Since more propellers have to be used, they have to be smaller and thus less efficient.
- The propellers of the idling systems cause drag.

== CODAG WARP ==
CODAG Water jet And Refined Propeller (WARP), a system developed by Blohm+Voss as option for their MEKO line of ships, also falls in this category, but avoids the above-mentioned problems. CODAG WARP uses two diesel engines to drive two propellers in a combined diesel and diesel (CODAD) arrangement, i.e., both shafts can also be powered by any single engine, and a centerline water jet powered by a gas turbine. The idling water jet does not cause drag, and since its nozzle can be placed further aft and higher it does not affect the size of the propellers.

== CODAG-electric ==
Another way to combine the two types of engines is to connect them to generators and drive the propellers electrically as in a diesel-electric. See Combined diesel–electric and gas (CODLAG) and Integrated Electric Propulsion (IEP). This also permits propeller pods, with the propulsion motors being located inside the pods.

== Land vehicles ==
The retired Swedish Stridsvagn 103 utilizes a diesel engine for slow cruising and aiming, and a gas turbine for additional power..

== See also ==
- Combined gas and gas (COGAG)
