= Pakistan Navy =

Maritime service branch of the Pakistan Armed Forces

- پاک بحریہ; Pāk Bahrí'a
- Crest of Pakistan Navy
- Founded: 14 August 1947 (79 years, 3 months ago)
- Country: Pakistan
- Type: Navy
- Role: Naval warfare; Maritime security; Power projection; Coastal defence; Second-strike capability
- Size: 30,000 active-duty personnel; 5,000 reserve force; 20,000–30,000 Marines; 2,000 Maritime Security Agency
- Part of: Pakistan Armed Forces
- Headquarters: Naval Headquarters (NHQ), Sector E-9, Islamabad
- Mottos: Arabic: حَسْبُنَا اللَّهُ وَنِعْمَ الْوَكِيلُ Urdu: ہمارے لیے اللّٰہ کافی ہے اور وہ بہترین کارساز ہے۔ (English: Allah is Sufficient for us - and what an excellent (reliable) Trustee (of affairs) is He!) (Qur'an, 3:173)
- Colours
- Anniversaries: Navy Day: 8 September
- Fleet: List of active Pakistan Navy ships
- Engagements: See list: India–Pakistan wars and conflicts; India–Pakistan war of 1965; India–Pakistan war of 1971; Bangladesh Liberation War; Kargil War; India–Pakistan standoff in 2001; India–Pakistan standoff in 2008; India–Pakistan border skirmishes (2016–2018); 2019 India–Pakistan border skirmishes; 2025 India–Pakistan conflict Conflict in Arab world; Gulf War; Pakistan Armed Forces deployments in Saudi Arabia Afghan conflict; NATO logistics in the Afghan War Somali Civil War; Operation United Shield; Operation Restore Hope; Operation Umeed-e-Nuh Sri Lankan civil war; Military assistance to Sri Lanka War on terror; Balochistan insurgency; Operations Near the Horn of Africa UN Peacekeeping missions; 2004 Tsunami relief operations; Operation Madad Yemeni civil war; Evacuation of Pakistani citizens; Red Sea crisis
- Website: paknavy.gov.pk

Commanders
- Commander-in-Chief: President Asif Ali Zardari
- Chief of Defence Forces: F.M Asim Munir
- Chief of the Naval Staff: Adm. Naveed Ashraf

Insignia
- Flag

- Jack

- Ensign

- Pennant

- Roundel

Aircraft flown
- Helicopter: Harbin Z-9; Alouette III; Westland Sea King
- Patrol: ATR-72-500; Lockheed P-3C Orion; Embraer Lineage 1000
- Reconnaissance: GIDS Uqab; EMT Luna X Hawker 850XP
- Transport: ATR 72-500

The Pakistan Navy (PN) (Urdu: پاک بحریہ, romanised: Pāk Bahrí'a, pronounced [ˈpaːk baɦɽia]) is the naval warfare branch of the Pakistan Armed Forces. The Chief of the Naval Staff, a four-star admiral, commands the navy. The Pakistan Navy operates on the coastline of Pakistan in the Arabian Sea and Gulf of Oman. It was established in August 1947 following the independence of Pakistan.

The primary role of the Pakistan Navy is to defend Pakistan's sea frontiers from any external enemy attack. In addition to its war services, the Navy has mobilised its war assets to conduct humanitarian rescue operations at home as well as participating in multinational task forces mandated by the United Nations to prevent seaborne terrorism and piracy off the coasts.

The Pakistan Navy is a volunteer force which has been in conflict with neighbouring India twice on its sea borders. It has been repeatedly deployed in the Indian Ocean to act as a military advisor to Gulf Arab states and other friendly nations during the events of multinational conflict as part of its commitment to the United Nations. The Pakistan Navy has several components including Naval Aviation, Marines, and the Maritime Security Agency (a coast guard). Since its commencement, the defensive role of the navy has expanded from securing the sealines and becoming the custodian of Pakistan's second strike capability with an ability to launch underwater missile system to target enemy positions.

The Chief of the Naval Staff is nominated by the Prime Minister and appointed by the President of Pakistan. Admiral Naveed Ashraf is the incumbent chief since 7 October 2023.

== History ==
=== Division of the Royal Indian Navy in 1947 ===
Today is a historic day for Pakistan, doubly so for those of us in the Navy. The Dominion of Pakistan has come into being and with it a new Navy – the Royal Pakistan Navy – has been born. I am proud to have been appointed to command it and serve with you at this time. In the coming months, it will be my duty and yours to build up our Navy into a happy and efficient force

— Muhammad Ali Jinnah, the founder of Pakistan, addressing the men and officers of HMIS Godavari in March 1948

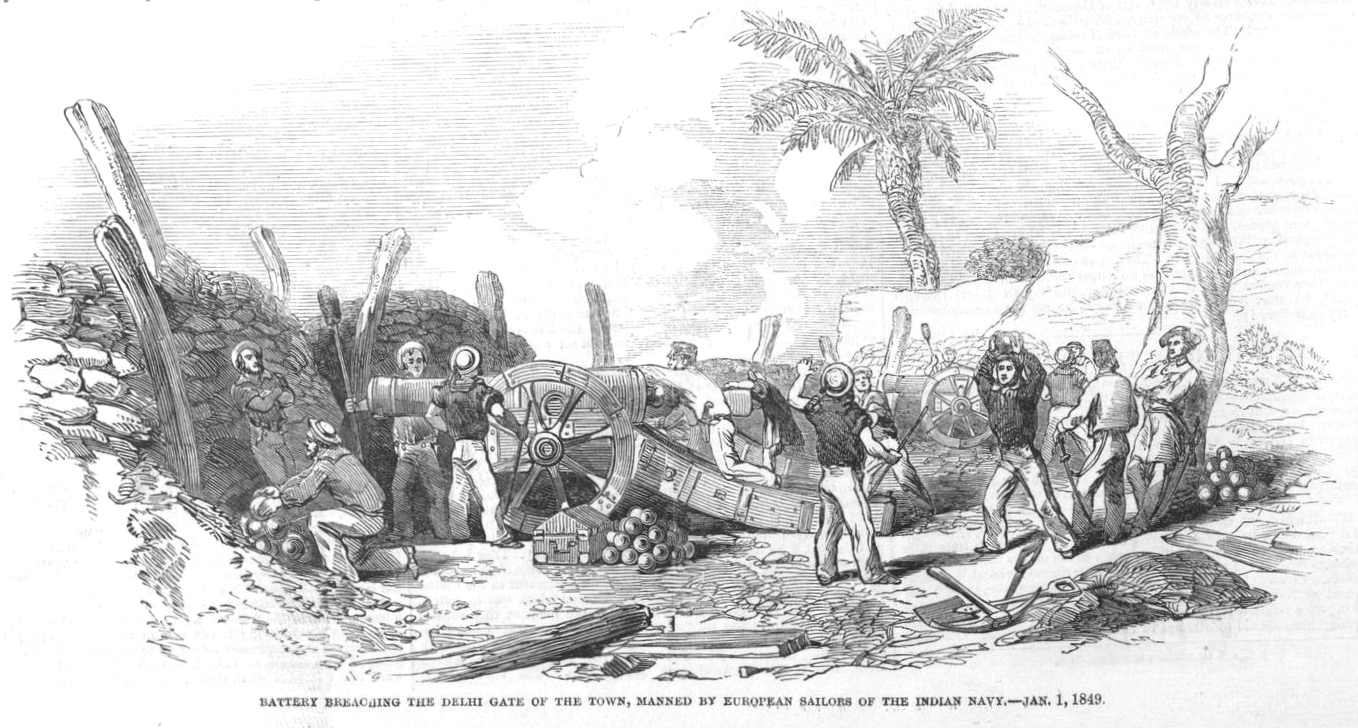
The Royal Indian Navy's rating sailors breaching the Gates of Delhi during the rebellion against the British rule in India in 1857

The Pakistan Navy came into existence on 15 August 1947 with the establishment of Pakistan as an independent state from the United Kingdom. The Armed Forces Reconstitution Committee (AFRC), under Field Marshal Auchinleck, the last British Commander-in-Chief, India (C-in-C, India), divided the shares and assets of the Royal Indian Navy (RIN) between India and Pakistan in a ratio of 2:1, despite Pakistan having inherited the high percentage of delta areas on its coast and the large maritime area covering the Arabian Sea on the West and the Bay of Bengal on the East. Pakistan received two sloops, two frigates, four minesweepers, two naval trawlers and four harbour launches. In addition, India also objected to transfer any machinery at the Bombay Dockyard to Pakistan and further refused to part the machinery that happened to be on its soil.

The navy endured a difficult beginning—of only 200 officers and 3,000 sailors inherited, the most senior was Captain HMS Choudri, who had little experience in military staffing. Of the 200 officers, twenty had come from the executive branch of the Royal Indian Navy,. Only six officers were mechanical engineers. There were no electrical engineers or specialists to care for the electrical systems used for weapons or other machinery. The navy suffered perennial problems with inadequate staff, lack of operational bases, lack of financial support, and poor technological and personnel resources. It was the smallest military branch, and lacked importance in federal budgeting.

Defence plans were based primarily from the point of view of the army and air force. The navy lacked facilities and maintenance machinery, as the only naval dockyard on the subcontinent was located in Bombay in India.

To overcome these difficulties, the navy launched a recruitment programme for the young nation, starting in East Pakistan. Sustaining the programme there proved difficult; therefore, it was moved to concentrate recruitment in West Pakistan. Furthermore, procurement was greatly determined by the navy's role in previous wars. Most functions were in coastal defense and monitoring sea lanes, not in combat, making it difficult to justify spending on major weapons systems.

=== The beginning: 1947–1964 ===
==== Reorganisation (1947–1964) ====
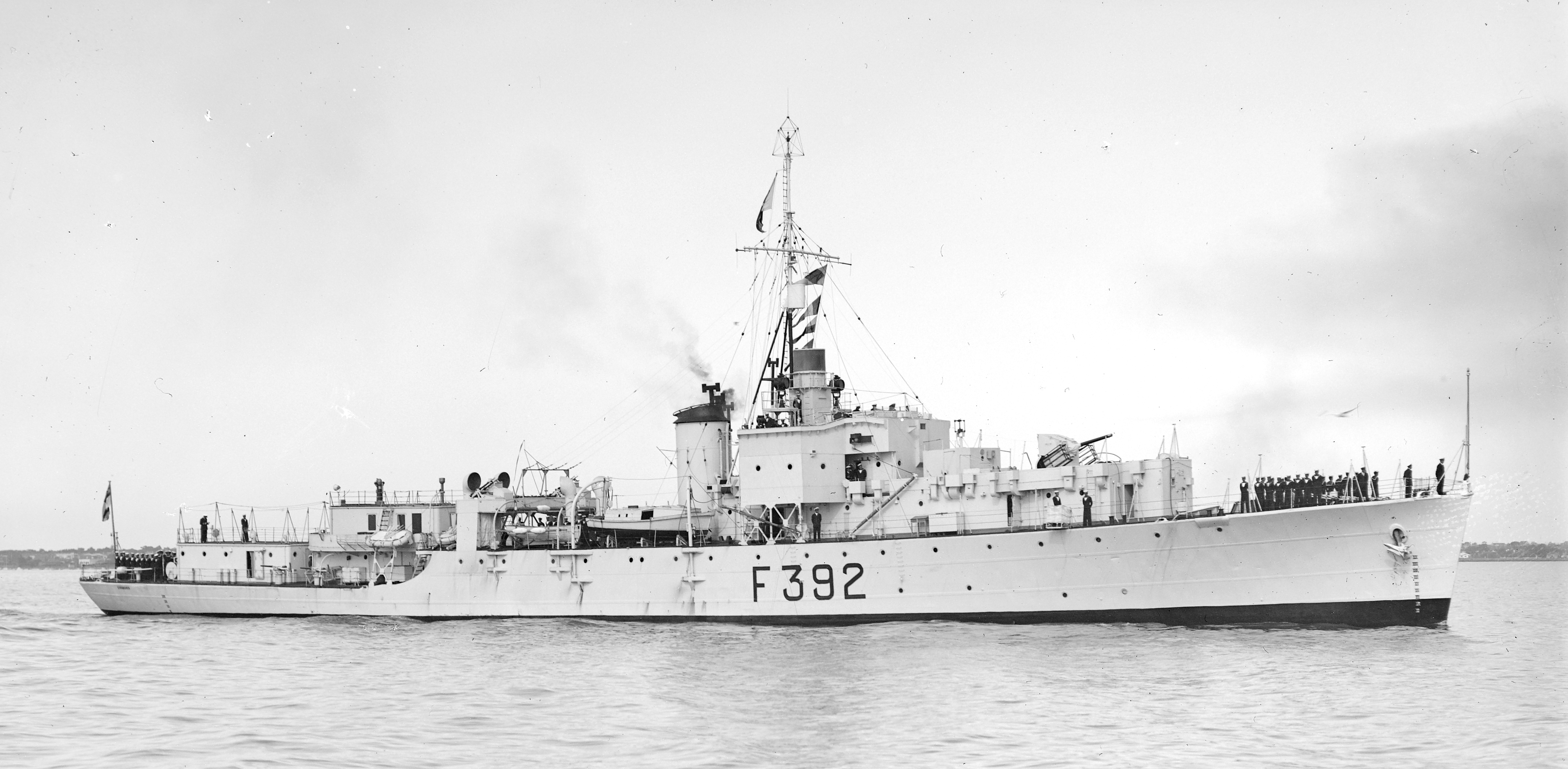
PNS Shamsher visiting Australia in 1951. The frigate was transferred to Pakistan by the Royal Indian Navy in 1947 as a training ship.

The Navy's combat actions largely remained in absence during the first war with India in 1947–48 as all the fighting was restricted to land and aerial combat missions. On operational planning, Captain HMS Choudri had engaged on commanding a former RIN destroyer from Karachi to Bombay to oversee the evacuation of Indian emigrants to Pakistan. In 1948, the Royal Pakistan Navy had to engage in humanitarian missions to evacuate Indian immigrants trapped in disputed and hostile areas, with its frigates operating continuously.

Command and control of the new Royal Pakistan Navy was extremely difficult as Prime Minister Liaquat Ali Khan's administration had to extend the employment of a large number of the Royal Navy officers from the British Admiralty, with Rear Admiral James Wilfred Jefford, RN, appointed as the Flag Officer Commanding (FOC) who worked on creating the contingency plan, "Short-term Emergency Plan (STEP)", to work up the frigates and naval defences in case of escalation of the war at sea. In 1948, the Directorate-General for the Naval Intelligence (DGNI), a staff corps, was established under Lieutenant S. M. Ahsan, who served as its first Director-General, in Karachi. When the first war came to an end in 1948, the Navy temporarily established its Navy NHQ in Karachi and acquired its first O-class destroyer from the transfer by the Royal Navy.

The Royal Pakistan Navy greatly depended on the generous donations from the British Royal Navy with two Battle-class destroyers, PNS Tippu Sultan and PNS Tariq. Tippu Sultan was commissioned on 30 September 1949, under Commander P.S. Evans, whilst Tariq was placed under the command of Lieutenant-Commander A. R. Khan. The two destroyers formed the 25th Destroyer Squadron, as PNS Jhelum and PNS Tughril, under Commander Muzaffar Hasan, also joined the Royal Pakistan Navy.

In 1950, the Navy's nationalisation took place when many officers from the air force and army volunteered to join the navy and NCOs gaining commission as an officers. Support from the army and air force to the navy led to the establishment of logistics and maintenance machinery with vigorous efforts directed towards integrating the navy presence in East Pakistan, thereby creating opportunities for people in East Pakistan to participate in the build-up.

In 1951, the Pakistan government called for appointing native chiefs of the armed forces, but it was not until 1953 that a native navy chief was appointed. The British Admiralty, however, maintained the command of the Navy through Rear-Admiral Jefford who had native deputy chiefs of staff including Commodore HMS Choudhri, Commodore Khalid Jamil, and Commander M.A. Alavi.

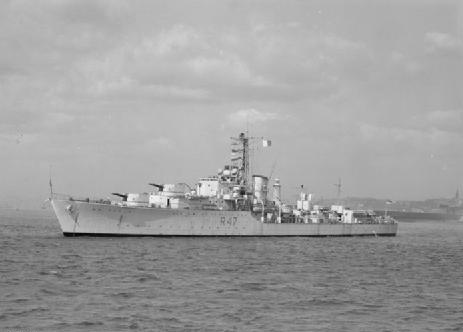
PNS Badr, a destroyer, visiting Great Britain on a goodwill mission in 1957

During this time, a number of goodwill missions were carried out by the navy's warships, and non-combat missions were conducted under the auspices of the Royal Navy. In 1951, HMS Choudhri's promotion papers as naval chief were approved by Prime Minister Liaquat Ali Khan but it was not until 1953 when HMS Choudhri was promoted as vice admiral and commander with the support from army commander-in-chief General Ayub Khan. He handed over the command of 25th Destroyer squadron to a Polish naval officer, Commander Romuald Nalecz-Tyminski.

In the mid-1950s, the Ministry of Finance awarded contracts to the Corps of Engineers (Pakistan Army) for the construction of the Karachi Naval Dockyard. In 1954, several efforts were made to procure a Ch-class submarine from the Royal Navy but was rejected by British Admiralty which agreed to loan the Ch-class destroyer, HMS Chivalrous, which was renamed PNS Taimur. From 1953 to 1956, HMS Choudri bitterly negotiated with the United States over the modernisation of the navy and convinced the U.S. government to provide monetary support for modernisation of ageing O–class destroyers and minesweepers, while commissioning the Ch–class destroyers from the Royal Navy. British naval tradition was disbanded and cancelled when the United States Navy's advisers were dispatched to the Pakistani military in 1955.

With the promulgation of the Constitution of Pakistan that established the republicanism featuring the federalised government, the prefix Royal was dropped, and the service was re-designated the Pakistan Navy ("PN") with the Jack replaced the Queen's colour and the White Ensign respectively in 1956. The order of precedence of the three services changed from Navy–Army–Air force to Army–Navy–Air Force.

In February 1956, the British government announced the transfer of several major surface combat warships to Pakistan Navy, including a cruiser and four destroyers to be purchased with funds made available under the U.S. Military Assistance Program. In 1957, the Navy finalised the purchase of a cruiser from the United Kingdom and used the government's own funds for the purchase which caused a great ire against Admiral Choudhri in the Finance Ministry.

In 1958, the Navy made an unsuccessful attempt to obtain Neptun-class submarines from Sweden using the American security funds; it was halted by the United States and Pakistan's Finance Ministry despite the fact that the idea had support from Army GHQ. In 1958–59, the Navy NHQ staff began quarrelling with the Army GHQ staff and the Ministry of Defense (MoD) over plans regarding the modernisation of the navy that resulted in bitter interservice rivalry between army and navy and ended with Admiral Choudri's resignation to the Presidency in 1959.

Proposal of attaining the aircraft carrier was deferred due to financial constraints, forcing Pakistan to move towards establishing the formidable submarine command. From 1956 to 1963, two destroyers, eight coastal minesweepers, and an oiler were procured from the United States and United Kingdom as a direct result of Pakistan's participation in the anti-Communist defence pacts SEATO and CENTO.

=== War with India and subsequent war deployments (1965–1970) ===
After the bitter resignation of Vice-Admiral HMS Choudri in 1959, Vice-Admiral Afzal Rahman Khan was appointed as the Commander in Chief in Navy who worked towards building relations with President Ayub Khan in retaining hopes for procuring a submarine despite financial constraints. The Royal Navy accepted the long awaiting requests from the Pakistan Navy for a regular visit to Karachi Naval Dockyard to provide first hand experience in submarine operations in 1960–61. The Ayub administration did not increase the financial funding of the navy at the expense to army and air force but he did not object to American contributions to train the Pakistan Navy in submarine operations. It was the U.S. Navy that provided an insightful and crucial training support to Pakistan Navy enabling it to conduct operations in long range in the Indian Ocean and the proposal of procuring the submarine was met with favourable views in 1963 due to the prospect of the Soviet Navy leasing a submarine to the Indian Navy. After seeing the U.S. contribution, the United Kingdom decided to provide training and education to Pakistan Navy on submarine operations, and in 1964, PNS Ghazi was commissioned from the United States under the Security Assistance Program (SAP).

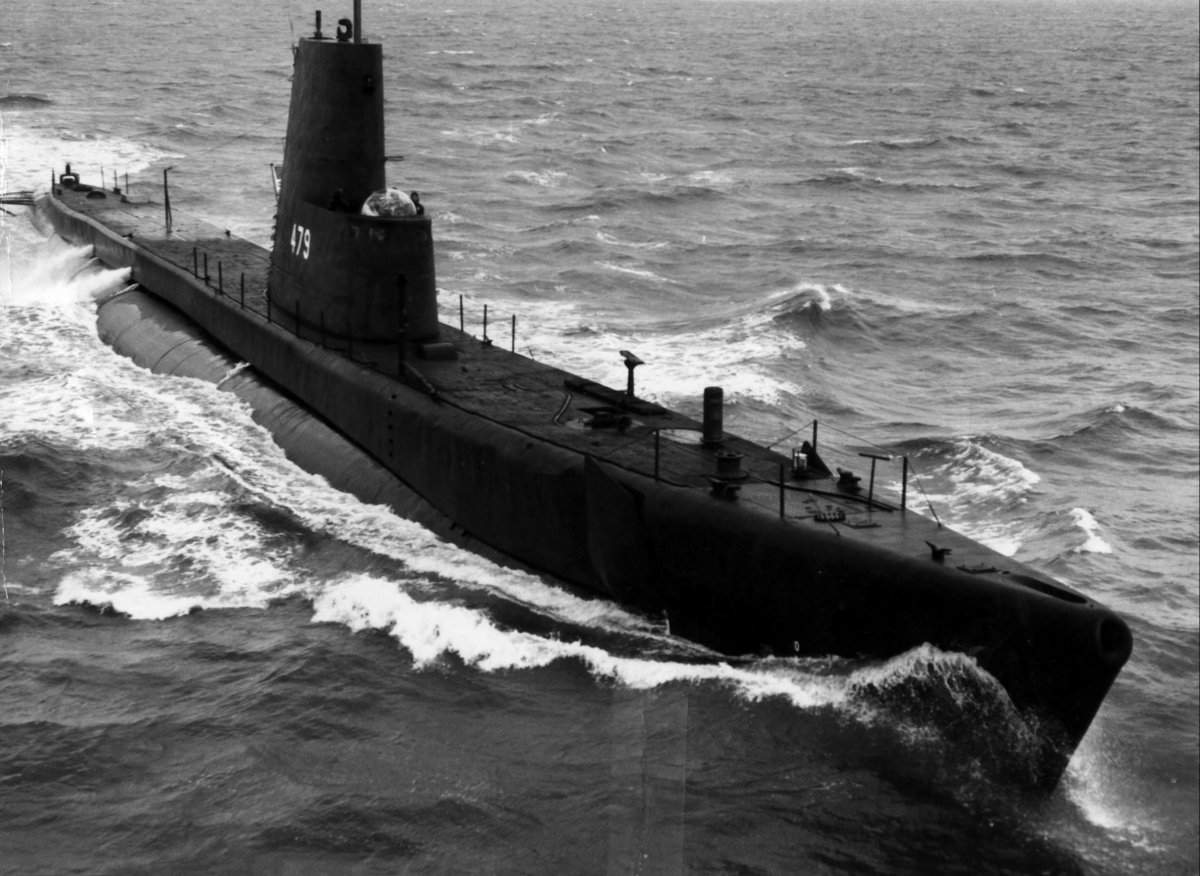
PNS Ghazi in war theatre in 1965. She executed a circumnavigation of Africa and Southern Europe in order to be refit in Turkey in 1968. Sunk and later destroyed in 1971 due to depth chargers deployed by INS Rajput which triggered torpedoes to fired on its own.

Even though, neither the Navy nor the Air Force was notified of the Kashmir incursion in 1965, the Navy was well-prepared at the time when the second war broke out between Pakistan and India in 1965. The naval chief Admiral Afzal Rahman Khan ordered all war units of the Pakistan Navy to take up defensive positions off the coast, but did not order any offensive operations in the Bay of Bengal. As the Indian Air Force's repeated sorties and raids disrupted PAF operations, the Navy assumed a more aggressive role in the conflict. On 2 September, the Navy deployed its first long-range submarine, PNS Ghazi under Commander K. R. Niazi which was charged with gathering intelligence on Indian naval movements that stalked the diverting threats posed by the aircraft carrier INS Vikrant.

On the night of 7/8 September, a naval squadron comprising four destroyers, one frigate, one cruiser, and one submarine, under the command of Commodore S. M. Anwar, launched artillery operation— an attack on the radar facilities used by the Indian Air Force in the small coastal town of Dwarka. The operation ended with limited damage to the area. After gunnery bombardment, Ghazi was deployed against the Indian Navy's Western Naval Command at Bombay on 22 September and ended her operations and reported safely back to Karachi Naval Dockyard on 23 September 1965.

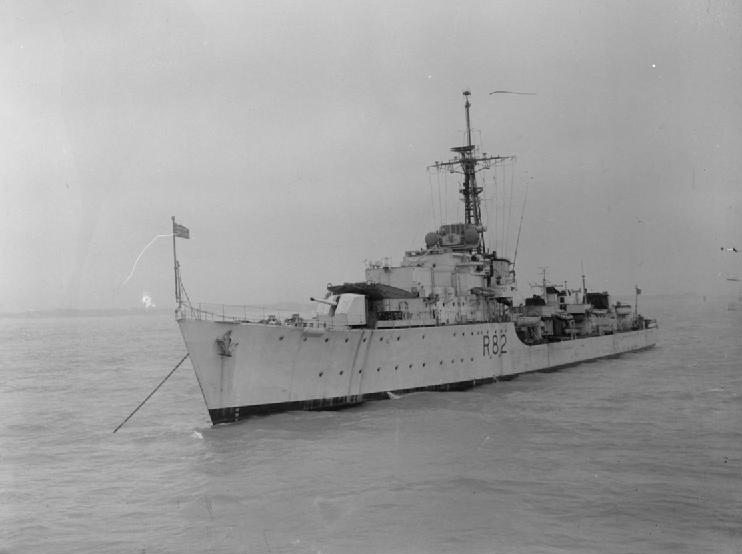
Small ship PNS Alamgir in 1947

The Pakistan Navy explored the idea of installing Russian missile system on former British frigates but Soviets refrained from doing so due to objections from India.

After the war, the United States imposed an arms embargo on Pakistan and Pakistani military began exploring options for military procurement from China, France, and Soviet Union. The United Kingdom offered the Navy to jointly built the Type 21 frigate but was rejected by Ayub administration that would only allow the financial capital to be spent on submarine procurement.

In 1966, the Pakistan Navy established its own special operations force, the Navy Special Service Group (Navy SSG) after the recommendations from the United States Navy. In 1966–70, Pakistan Navy had been well aware of massive procurement and acquisitions of weapon systems being acquired by India from the Soviet Union and United Kingdom, and the danger it will posed to Pakistan. In 1966–69, there were series of unsuccessful talks of acquiring the warships from the Soviet Navy which ended with no yielding results. The Soviet Union offered to sell their Osa-class missile boat but the Pakistan Navy wanted the Styx missiles to be installed in frigates in a belief that the missile boats were not big enough to meet the Pakistani requirements to operate in the Indian Ocean. The Russians later determined to their strategic interests lay with India and allowed the developing relationship with Pakistan to wither.

Difficulties arose between and after the arms embargo was lifted by the United States which lifted based strictly on cash-and-carry basis. Pleas for strengthening the Navy in East Pakistan were ignored due to monetary issues and financial constraints restricted the Navy's capabilities to function more efficiently. In 1968, the Daphné-class submarines were procured from France while operating a Tench-class submarine that had been maintained with the help of the Turkish Navy. Due to the Egyptian blockade of the Suez Canal, the Navy had to execute a notable submerged circumnavigation operation from the Indian Ocean through the Atlantic Ocean in order to undergo a refit program at the Gölcük Naval Shipyard in Turkey which was the only facility to manage the refitting and mid-life upgrades of military computers of the Tench class. Despite reservations harbouring by the Navy NHQ about the ageing Ghazi, she was sailed under the command of Commander Ahmed Tasnim starting from the Karachi coast in Indian Ocean to Cape of Good Hope, South Africa, through the Atlantic Ocean and ended at the east coast of the Sea of Marmara where the Gölcük Naval Shipyard was located.

In 1968–69, the Navy NHQ staff began its tussle with the AHQ staff over the issue establishing the naval aviation who feared the loss of fighter jets and their pilots in the sea and was hostile towards this idea. The United States entered in discussing the transfer of P3B Orion aircraft to the Navy in 1970 with Yahya administration but were not procured until the end of the 1970s. In 1970, the foreign relations between Pakistan and East Pakistan further deteriorated and the Navy knew that it was impossible to defend East Pakistan from approaching Indian Navy. Series of reforms were carried when Navy's serious reservations were considered by the Yahya administration and East Pakistanis were hastily recruited in what was known as Eastern Naval Command (Pakistan) but this proved to be disaster for Navy when majority of Bengali naval officers and ≈3,000 sailors defected to India to join the Awami League's military wing– the Mukti Bahini. Such events had jeopardised the operational scope of the Navy and the Navy NHQ staffers and commanders knew very well that it (Navy) was ill-prepared for the war and Pakistan was about to learn the consequences of disconnecting strategy from reality.

=== India–Pakistan war of 1971 ===
By 1971, the Navy NHQ staffers and their commanders knew very well that the Pakistan Navy was poorly represented in East Pakistan (now Bangladesh) and there was no main infrastructure to conduct defensive operation against the Eastern Naval Command of Indian Navy in Bay of Bengal. The Navy was only able conducted the riverine-based operations that was being undertaken by the Pakistan Marines with the assistance from the Navy Special Service Group, code named, Barisal, in April 1971. Although, the Governor of East Pakistan, Vice-Admiral S.M. Ahsan, made efforts to increase the naval presence and significance in 1969 but the Indian Navy's Eastern Naval Command continued to pose a significant threat since it had capability of conduct operations in long-range areas.

Furthermore, the defections from Navy's Bengali officers and sailors had jeopardise the Navy's operational scope who went onto join the Awami League's militant wing, the Mukti Bahini in a program known as Jackpot. Though, the program was disrupted by the Navy from further annihilation but the naval facilities were severely damaged due to this operation on 15 March 1971. East-Pakistan's geography was surrounded by India on all three landward sides by the Indian Army as the Navy was in attempt to prevent India from blocking the coasts.

During this time, the Navy NHQ was housed in Karachi that decided to deploy the newly MLU Ghazi submarine on East while Hangor in West for the intelligence gathering purposes.

At the end of East-Pakistan crisis.... We (Eastern Command) had no intelligence and hence, were both deaf and blind with the Indian Navy and Indian Air Force pounding us day and night....

— Admiral Mohammad Sharif, to U.S. Admiral Zumwalt in 1971

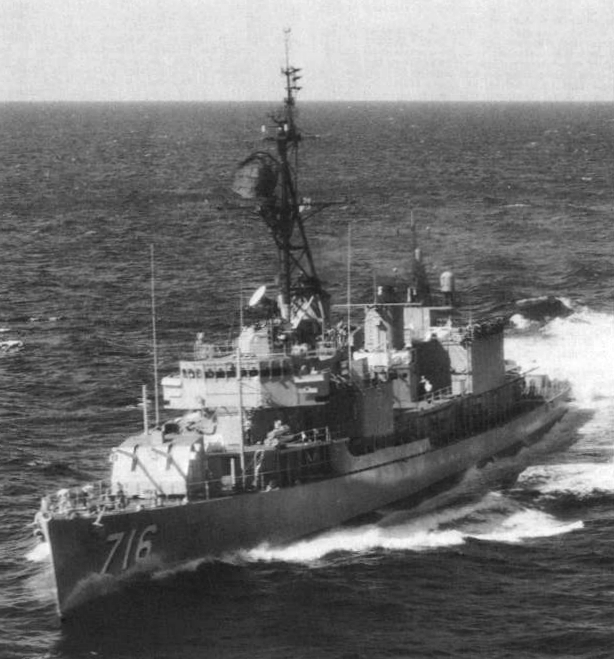
PNS Nazim, took part in the Vietnam and Korean Wars in the U.S. Navy as USS Wiltsie. She is now serving in the Pakistan Maritime Security Agency as its "on-sea" headquarters.

With no naval aviation branch to guard the Karachi port, the Indian Navy breached the seaborne borders of Pakistan and successfully launched the first missile attack, consisting of three Soviet-built Osa-class missile boats escorted by two anti-submarine patrol vessels on 4 December 1971. Nearing Karachi's port area, the Indian Navy's squadron launched Styx missiles anti-ship missiles, which the obsolescent Pakistani warships had no viable defence against. Two of the warships, PNS Muhafiz and PNS Khaibar, were sunk, while PNS Shahjahan was damaged beyond repair. After the attacks, the Indian Navy's missile boat squadron safely returned to its home base without sustaining any damages.

On 8 December 1971, Hangor commanded by its Commander Ahmed Tasnim, sank the Indian frigate INS Khukri off the coast of Gujarat, India— this was the first sinking of a warship by a submarine since World War II, and resulted in the loss of eighteen officers and one-seventy six sailors of the Indian Navy while the inflicting severe damages to another warship, INS Kirpan, by the same submarine. The Pakistan Air Force now covering for Karachi made several of the unsuccessful attempts to engage the Indian Navy's missile boat squadron by carrying out the aerial bombing missions over the Okha Harbor– the forward base of the Indian Navy's missile boat squadron. The Indian Navy retaliated with a second missile attack on Pakistan's coast on the night of 8 December 1971 when a small flotilla of Indian vessels, consisting of a missile boat and two frigates, approached Karachi and launched a missile attack that sank the Panamanian cargo ship Gulf Star, PNS Dacca and the British merchant ship SS Harmattan were damaged.

The missile-based attacks were the complete success for the Indian Navy, and a psychological trauma for Pakistan Navy, the human and material cost severely cutting into its combat capability, nearly 1,700 sailors perished at the barracks.

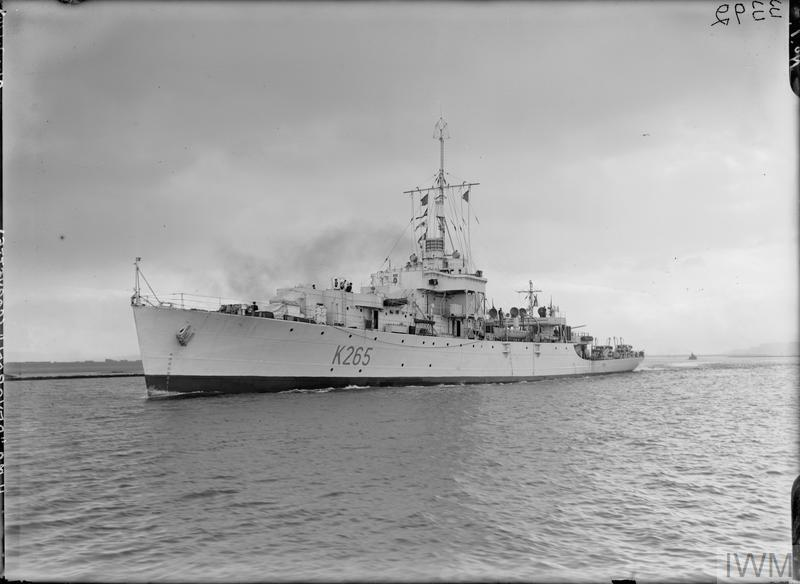
PNS Zulfiqar in 1947. She was subjected to a serious friendly fire incident during the Indo-Pakistani Naval War of 1971 when the senior naval observers misidentified their own ship as a smaller missile boat, giving clearance to the Pakistan Air Force to mount a missile attack. She was scrapped in metal in 1983.

The commercial pilots from the Pakistan International Airlines volunteered to conduct air surveillance missions with the Pakistan Air Force, but this proved less than helpful when the Pakistan Navy's forward observer team, led by Cdre. A. W. Bhombal misidentified their own larger frigate, PNS Zulfiqar, as an Indian missile boat, giving clearance to the F-86 fighter jets of the Pakistan Air Force which made several attack runs before finally identifying Zulfiqar by the Navy NHQ. This serious friendly fire incident resulted in further loss of navy personnel, as well as the loss of the ship, which was severely damaged and the Pakistan Navy's operational capabilities were now virtually extinct, and morale plummeted. The Indian Navy observers who watched the raid nearby later wrote in their war logs that the "PAF pilots failed to recognize the difference between a large PNS Zulfiqar frigate and a relatively small Osa missile boat." The PAF, however, contested this claim by holding Cdre. Bhombal of the responsibility of misidentifying his own warship and giving clearance to the PAF to mount an attack on their own ship.

The Navy's only long range submarine, Ghazi, was deployed to the area but, according to neutral sources, it sank en route under mysterious circumstances. Pakistani authorities state that it sank either due to internal explosion or detonation of mines which it was laying at the time. The Indian Navy claims to have sunk the submarine.

The submarine's destruction enabled the Indian Navy to enforce a blockade on then East Pakistan. According to the defence magazine, Pakistan Defence Journal, the attack on Karachi, Dhaka, Chittagong and the loss of Ghazi, the Navy no longer was able to match the threat of Indian Navy as it was already outclassed by the Indian Navy after the 1965 war.

The damage inflicted by the Indian Navy and Indian Air Force on the Navy stood at seven gunboats, one minesweeper, two destroyers, three patrol craft, eighteen cargo, supply and communication vessels, and large-scale damage inflicted on the naval base and docks in the coastal town of Karachi. Three merchant navy ships; Anwar Baksh, Pasni and Madhumathi; and ten smaller vessels were captured. Around 1,900 personnel were lost, while 1413 servicemen (mostly officers) were captured by Indian forces in Dhaka. The Indian Navy lost 18 officers and 176 sailors and a frigate, while another frigate was damaged and a Breguet Alizé naval aircraft was shot down by the Pakistan Air Force.

According to one Pakistan scholar, Tariq Ali, the Pakistan Navy lost half its force in the war. Despite the limited resources and manpower, the Navy performed its task diligently by providing support to inter-services (air force and army) until the end.

According to the testimony provided by the Admiral Mohammad Shariff in 2015, the primary reason for this loss has been attributed to the High Command's failure in defining a role for the Navy, or even considering Navy as military in general. Since then the Navy has sought to improve the structure and fleet by putting special emphasis on sub-surface warfare capability as it allows for the most efficient way to deny the control of Pakistani sea lanes to an adversary. In a thesis written by Dr. P. I. Cheema in 2002, Ayub Khan, who had enjoyed considerable influence on Pakistan's national politicians, did not fully understood the Navy as a military service or neither comprehend the importance of safeguarding the sea lines of communication, which prevented the development of the Navy as a potent force as it should have in the 1970s.

=== Restructuring and building towards modern Navy: 1972–1989 ===
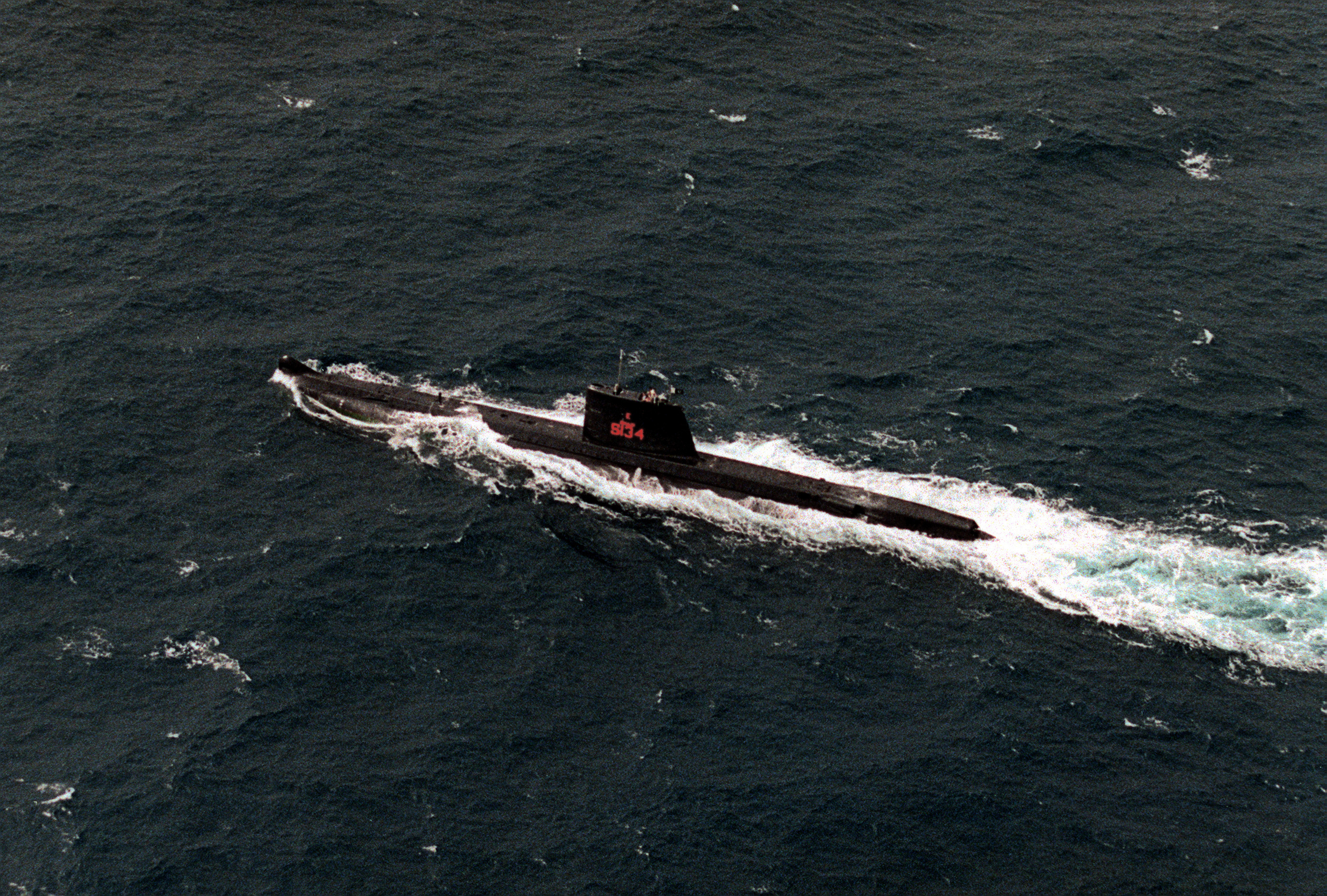
The Daphné-class submarine PNS Ghazi deployed during the Operation Restore Hope in 1991. She was purchased from the Portuguese Navy in 1975 and joined the Pakistan Navy in 1977.

After 1971 war, steps were taken to modernise and increase the operational scope of the Navy. Unlike the army or the air force, the naval officers were able to continue their military service with the Navy, and their promotions were relatively quicker than other military branches in 1972–74.

In January 1972, the Bhutto administration formed the POW Commission to investigate the number of war prisoners held by the Indian Army in East and submitted the request to the Supreme Court of Pakistan to investigate the causes of the war failure with India in 1971. After concluding a quick visit in the United States in 1972, President Zulfikar Ali Bhutto used his administrative powers to dishonourably discharge the commission of five senior admirals in the Navy, appointing the junior most Hasan Hafeez Ahmed as the first Chief of Naval Staff of the Navy. In 1973, the Navy NHQ was permanently moved to Islamabad to provide synergy with the Army GHQ in Rawalpindi.

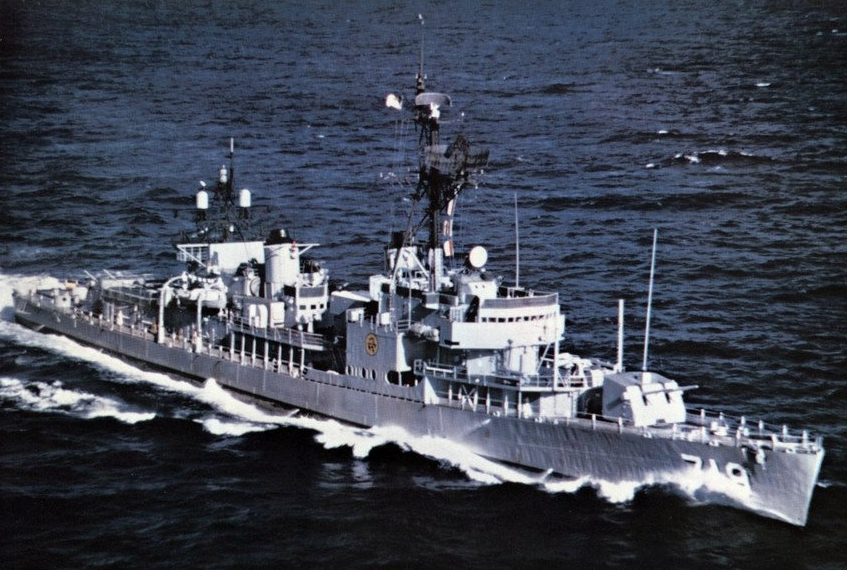
The Gearing-class PNS Taimur (former USS Epperson) was acquired from the United States in 1977. She was sunk as a target during a naval exercise in 2000.

In 1974, the Naval Aviation branch was established with the transfer of the Westland Sea King helicopters from the United Kingdom in 1975, followed by test firing the surface-to-ship Exocet missile as a befitting response to the Indian Navy in 1979. With the ability to fire the land-based Exocet missile from a reconnaissance aircraft, the Navy became the first of its kind in the South Asia to acquire land-based ballistics missile capable long range reconnaissance aircraft.

In 1976, the Navy moved towards successfully acquiring the military computers from the British firm, the Ferranti, to increase its defence's for its coastlines. The War Enquiry Commission noted the lack of strategic communication and the grand strategy between the four-branches of the military during the conflict and wars with India, recommending the establishment of the Joint Chiefs of Staff Committee to maintain strategic military communication between the inter-services and the federal government, that is to be chaired by the appointed Chairman joint chiefs as the government's principal military adviser. In 1976, Navy saw its first four-star rank admiral when Mohammad Shariff was promoted to this rank, and later becoming the first admiral to be appointed as the Chairman of Joint Chiefs Committee in 1977. In 1977, the United States reportedly transferred the two refitted Gearing-class destroyer to the Pakistan Navy, which were much superior to the British frigates, followed by obtaining more destroyers from the U.S. Navy in 1982–83.

During this time, the Navy to diversify its procurement with defence deals made with China, France, and the United Kingdom but the dependence grew on China when the Navy acquired the anti-submarine warships that gave the Navy credible sea-denial capability. In 1979, the France offered to sell their Agosta-70A-class submarine and was immediately acquired which were commissioned as Hurmat and Hashmat. Induction of the Agosta-70A class gave Pakistan Navy a depth advantage over the Indian Navy, and gave the Navy an ability to conduct operations in deeper Indian Ocean at wider range.

In 1982, the Reagan administration submitted the proposal of US$3.2 billion aid for Pakistan that was aimed towards economic uplift and security assistance to the United States Congress as the Navy entered in successful negotiation of obtaining the Harpoon system, despite the strong Indian lobby opposing and objecting of this deal. In 1985, the Navy bought the Mirage 5V aircraft for the naval role and were equipped with the Exocet A39 missile that gives the capability of sea denial to the Pakistan Navy. With the induction of the missile systems, long-range and depth endurance submarines, missiles destroyers, fighter aircraft, and establishment of the Pakistan Maritime Security Agency, the Pakistan Navy eventually ended the Indian Navy's control over the Indian Ocean, and the Indian Navy's confidence that it could contain the Pakistan Navy at shorelines.

Eventually, the Pakistan Navy began its wartime deployment in Middle Eastern countries through the Persian Gulf and deployed its war assets in Saudi Arabia in support of the U.S. Navy's fleet in wake of the events involving the Iran–Iraq War and tensions with Libya. In 1982, the Reagan administration approved US$3.2 billion military and economic aid to Pakistan with Pakistan acquiring eight Brooke and Garcia-class frigates from the United States Navy on a five-year lease in 1988. A depot for repairs, USS Hector followed the lease of these ships in April 1989. This was done due to the Zia administration's co-operation with the Reagan administration against the Soviet Union's invasion in Afghanistan.

=== Self reliance, engagement and covert operations (1990–1999) ===
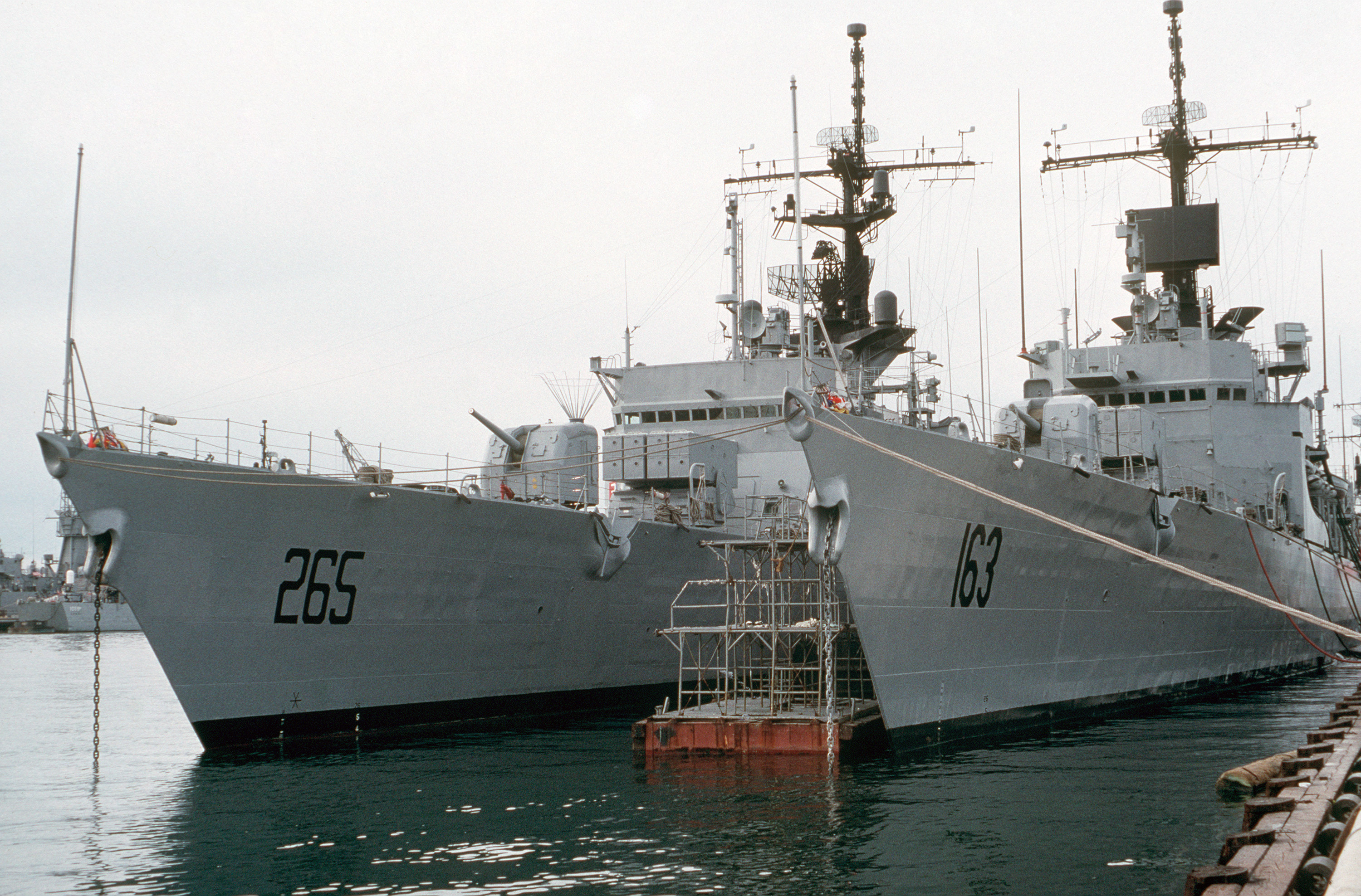
The Garcia-class and Brooke-class guided missile destroyer (FFG) being transferred to Pakistan Navy in 1986. All were returned to United States in 1993–95 when the renewing of lease with an option of purchase was denied by the United States.

After the Russian troops withdrawal from Afghanistan in 1989, the Bush administration imposed the arms embargo on Pakistan by uncovering the existence of the covert atomic bomb program to the United States Congress, which ultimately refrained the transfer of the maritime patrol aircraft, missile systems, and defence software on 1 October 1990. With the expiration of the lease of the Garcia and Brooke-class guided missile frigates, the Navy had to return the frigates to the United States that were sold to India for scrapped metals, and Navy to faced the problems for adequate funding towards the modern Navy. The embargo seriously impaired the Navy's operational scope and paralysed its ability to operate in the Indian Ocean, since the Navy's fleet was composed of entirely the former U.S.-built warships.

Since 1987, the Pakistan Navy had been interested in acquiring the Type 21 frigates from the United Kingdom, and the Navy turned to the Royal Navy for an immediate purchase which was approved in 1993 whose expensive refitting and technological upgrades had to carried out by Pakistan itself at their Naval Base in Karachi over the years. In 1994, the Pakistan Navy entered in lengthy, complicated, and controversial negotiation with France to acquire the long-range submarine technology by dismissing the idea of procuring nuclear-powered submarine from China due to noise issue that the Indian Navy was quiet able to track. Despite embargo, the United States Navy maintained its relations with Pakistan Navy, inviting the Pakistanis to participate in the Inspired Siren in 1994, and gave the Pakistan Navy instructions and run down on the nuclear submarine and aircraft carrier operations. In an attempt to warm the political relations with the United States, the Pakistani military joined the U.S. actions in the Somali Civil War, conducting wartime patrol in the Somali coast.

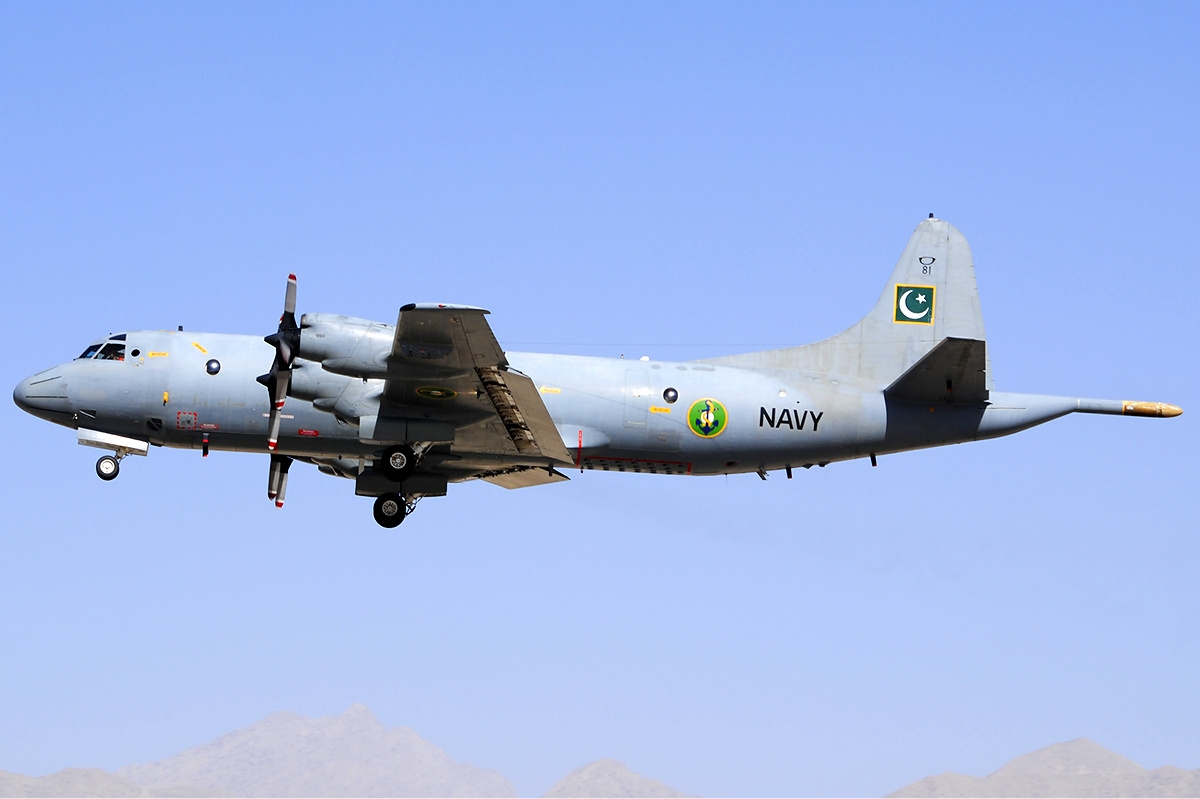
The Navy's P3C Orion taking a flight in 2010. One of its sister aircraft was involved in serious crash during its routine mission in 1999, claiming valuable lives.

In 1994, the Navy was deployed in support of the U.S. Navy and extended its support in 1995 to participate in Operation United Shield to conclude its side of operation after evacuating personnel and equipment of the army, marines, and air force. By 1996, the Brown amendment was introduced that allowed the uplifting of the embargo on Pakistan, allowing the transfer of the maritime patrol aircraft to the Navy.

By 1997, the controversy over the technology transfer from France had tarnished the public image of the Navy with the arrest of naval chief when several cases were levelled on political and military leadership of the Navy. Despite India's strong objections in France, the air-independent propulsion was transferred to Pakistan which built the Agosta 90B-class submarine, capable to operating in Indian Ocean and at higher submarine depth. In 1999, the Navy saw the public disagreement with the federal government over the issue of Pakistan Army's engagement with Indian Army in Kashmir and over the rightful appointment of the Admiral Fasih Bokhari as Chairman joint chiefs. Pakistan Navy was forced to deploy its existing war assets when the Indian Navy deployed its warships near Korangi Creek Cantonment and Port of Karachi with their codename: Operation Talwar.

On 10 August 1999, a serious incident took place in Sir Creek region when the Indian Air Force shot down the Naval Aviation aircraft that resulted in deaths of 16 naval personnel, mostly officers. On 29 August 1999, another aircraft of the Navy, P3C Orion, was lost due to an accident with the loss of twenty one lives.

Over the issue of the Indian Air Force's shot down of the aircraft, the Navy filed a lawsuit against the Indian Air Force at the International Court of Justice, but the claim was later dismissed due to over-reaching of the court's mandate.

Pakistan fully endorse the requirements of a strong navy, capable of safeguarding Pakistan's sea frontiers and her Lines of Communication, monitoring and protecting her exclusive economic zone. Continuous efforts are at hand to provide the best available equipment to the Navy despite all economic constraints.

— Pervez Musharraf, 1999

After his incident in 1999, another proposal was raised to switched the air-independent propulsion of Agosta submarine to substitute with nuclear propulsion, however the proposal was dismissed.

==== War on terror in Afghanistan and operations in North-West (2001–present) ====
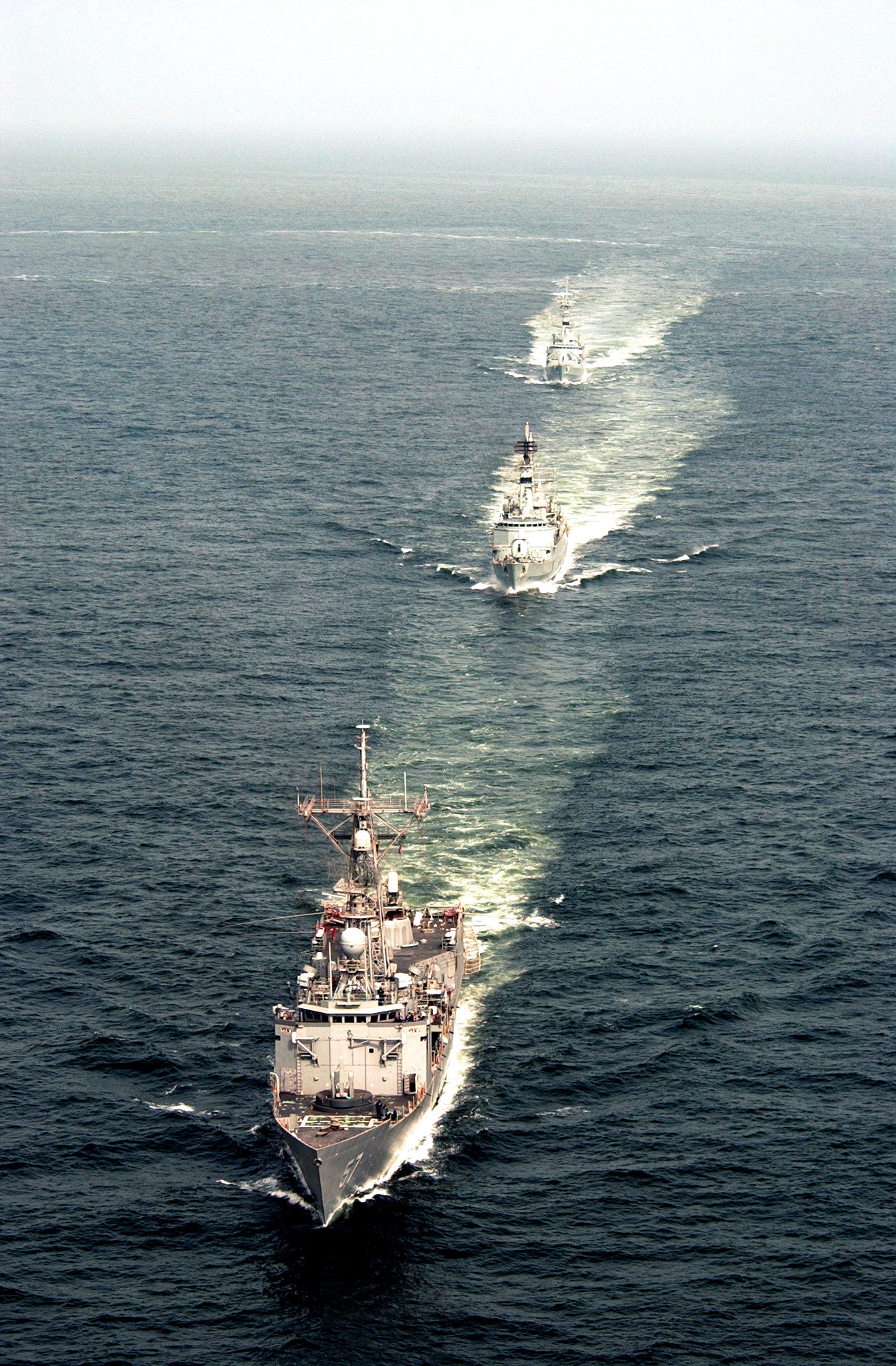
PNS Shah Jahan and PNS Tippu Sultan, the Tariq-class guided missile destroyers, participating in Exercise Inspired Siren in the Indian Ocean in 2002.

After the 9/11 terrorist attacks in the United States, the sanctions on Pakistan were eventually uplifted, allowing the Navy to procure the U.S.-built weapon systems and warships to regain its ability to operate in the Indian Ocean as it became involved in war preparations during the standoff with India in 2001–02. In 2001, the Navy took serious consideration of deploying the nuclear weapons on its submarines although none of the nuclear weapons were ever deployed in the submarines.

In 2003–04, there were several proposals made for acquiring the vintage aircraft carriers but the Navy itself had dismissed the idea since the country has not aspired to have an aircraft capability. In 2002–03, the Pakistan Navy deployment took place in the Indian Ocean, participating in the naval drills to combat terrorism from seaborne platforms, and eventually entered in defence negotiations with China for acquiring the technology to designing and building the guided missile frigates— the F-22P guided missile frigates were eventually built it in 2006–15.

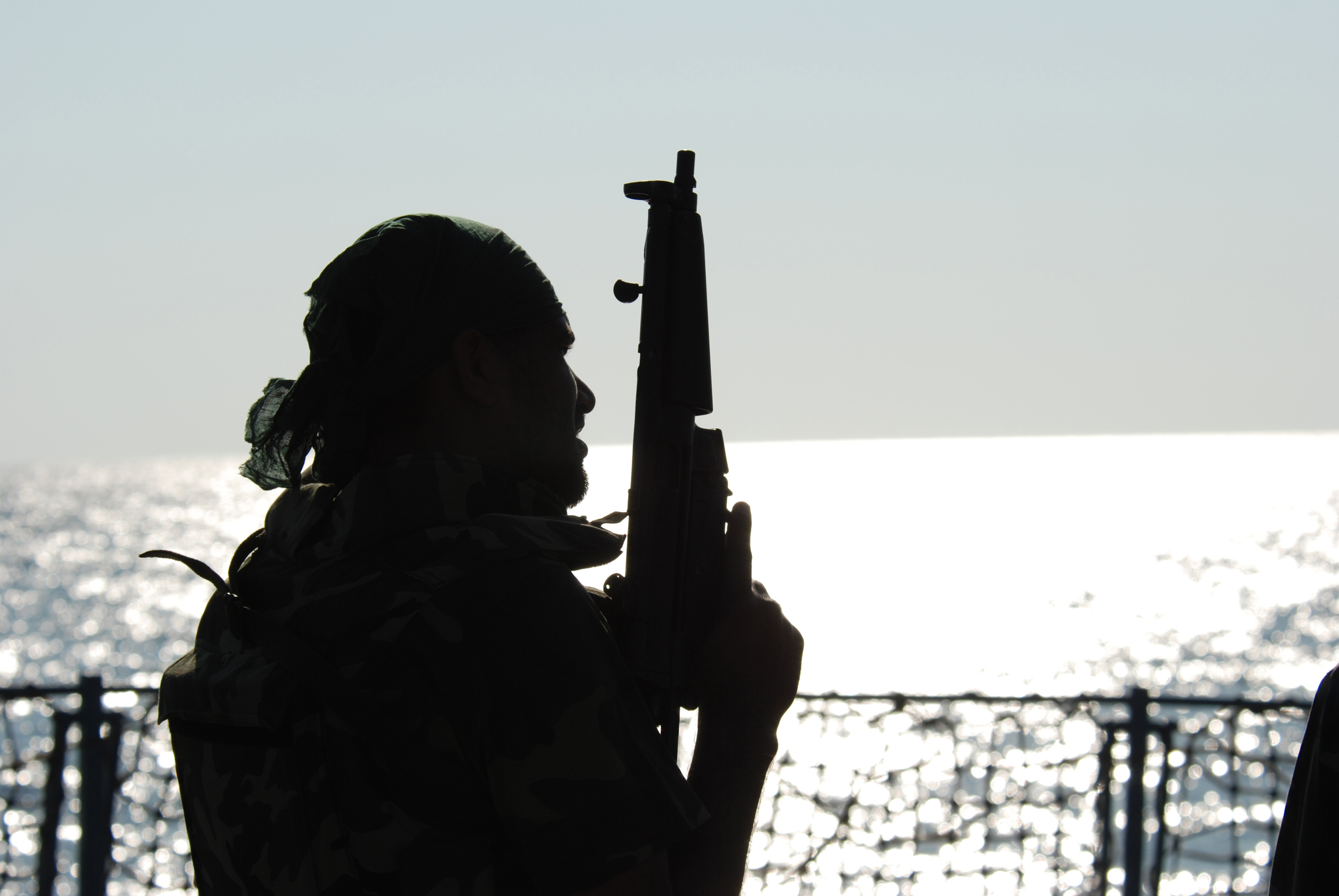
An operative of the Navy Special Service Group (SSGN) is silhouetted by the setting sun abroad PNS Babur while under way in the Indian Ocean in 2007.

Since 2004, the Navy's deployment took place in Indian Ocean, playing a crucial role in the multinational NAVCENT in Bahrain, and took the leadership of the CTF-150 and CTF-151 as well as taking active participation in the Operation Enduring Freedom in 2006–10. In 2008, the task force group consisting of PNS Badr, PNS Shah Jahan, PNS Nasr, and the Pakistan Air Force's Explosive Ordnance Disposal participated in the Exercise Inspired Union with the U.S. Navy in the Indian Ocean to develop skills in a prevention of seaborne terrorism.

Its deployment in the war on terror also included their actions in the War in Afghanistan when the Navy's special forces were deployed to take participation in the Operations: Black Thunderstorm, Rah-i-Nijat, Mehran, and the Help.

Despite its seaborne mission, the Navy had played an active role in controlling the insurgency in former tribal belt in Western Pakistan, mostly taking roles in managing logistics and intelligence gathering as well as conducting ground operations with the army in Western areas to track down the al-Qaeda operatives. From 2010 to 2011, the Navy was in a brief direct conflict with the violent TTP group and al-Qaeda, and its Naval Intelligence was able to track down the infiltrated militants within the ranks of the Navy.

In 2015, the Navy was deployed in support of the Saudi-led blockade of Yemen after accepting the request from the Saudi Arabia. As of current, the Navy continues increase its operational scope in the Indian Ocean and reportedly successfully entering in defence talks with Turkey to jointly built the MILGEM project in Pakistan in 2018–2019 while it had earlier announced to start the building the program of the nuclear submarine for its current operational capabilities in 2013.

== Organization, Naval Headquarters ==
=== Principal Staff Commands and Principal Staff Officers ===
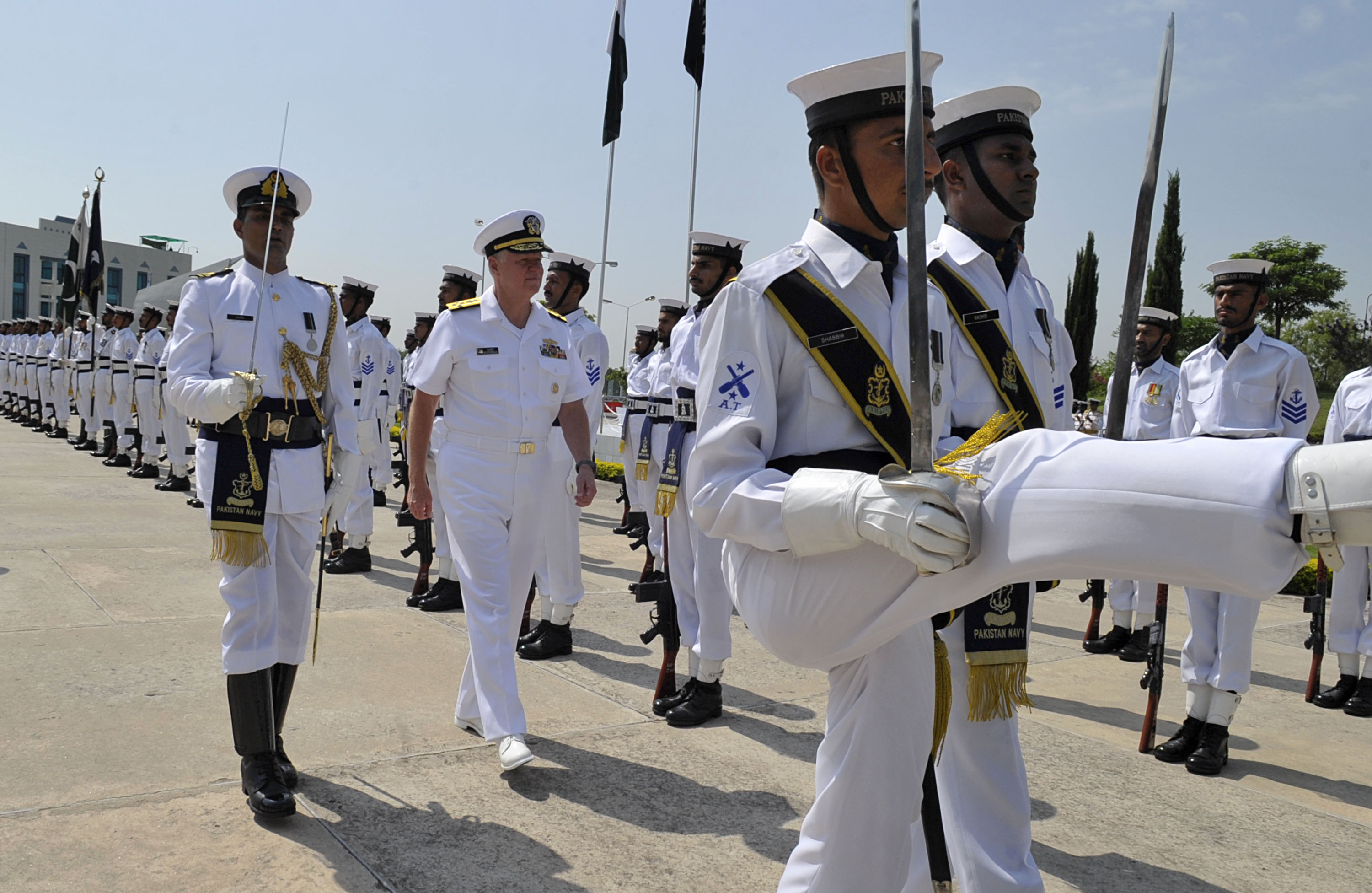
American Chief of Naval Operations, Adm. Gary Roughead, inspecting Pakistan Navy sailors at the Naval HQ in Islamabad in 2009.

Leadership in the Navy is provided by the Minister of Defense, leading and controlling the direction of the department of navy from the Naval Secretariat-II at the Ministry of Defense, with the Defense Secretary who is responsible for the bureaucratic affairs of the army's department. The Constitution sets the role of the elected President of Pakistan as the civilian Commander-in-Chief of the Pakistan Armed Forces while the Prime Minister of Pakistan served as the Chief Executive of the Pakistan Armed Forces, both the people-elected civilians, the President and Prime minister, maintains a civilian control of the military.

The Chief of Naval Staff (CNS), an appointed four-star rank admiral, is a principal military adviser on the naval/maritime security affairs to the Federal government and is a senior member of the Joint Chiefs of Staff Committee (JCSC)— a military body that advises and briefs the elected civilian Prime Minister and its executive cabinet on national security affairs and operational military matters under the Chairman of the Joint Chiefs of Staff Committee.

The war functions of the Navy is controlled from the single combat headquarters, the Navy NHQ, located in Islamabad at vicinity of the Joint Staff Headquarters and the Army GHQ in Rawalpindi Cantonment in Punjab in Pakistan. The Chief of Naval Staff controls and commands the Navy at all levels of operational command, and is assisted by number of Principal Staff Officers (PSOs) (Staff Commanders) who are commissioned at the three-star rank and two-star rank admirals. The Staff Appointments marked in the light goldish yellow colour are the most important seats at NHQ which play a very important administrative role for the proper functioning of the Pakistan Navy and its assets.

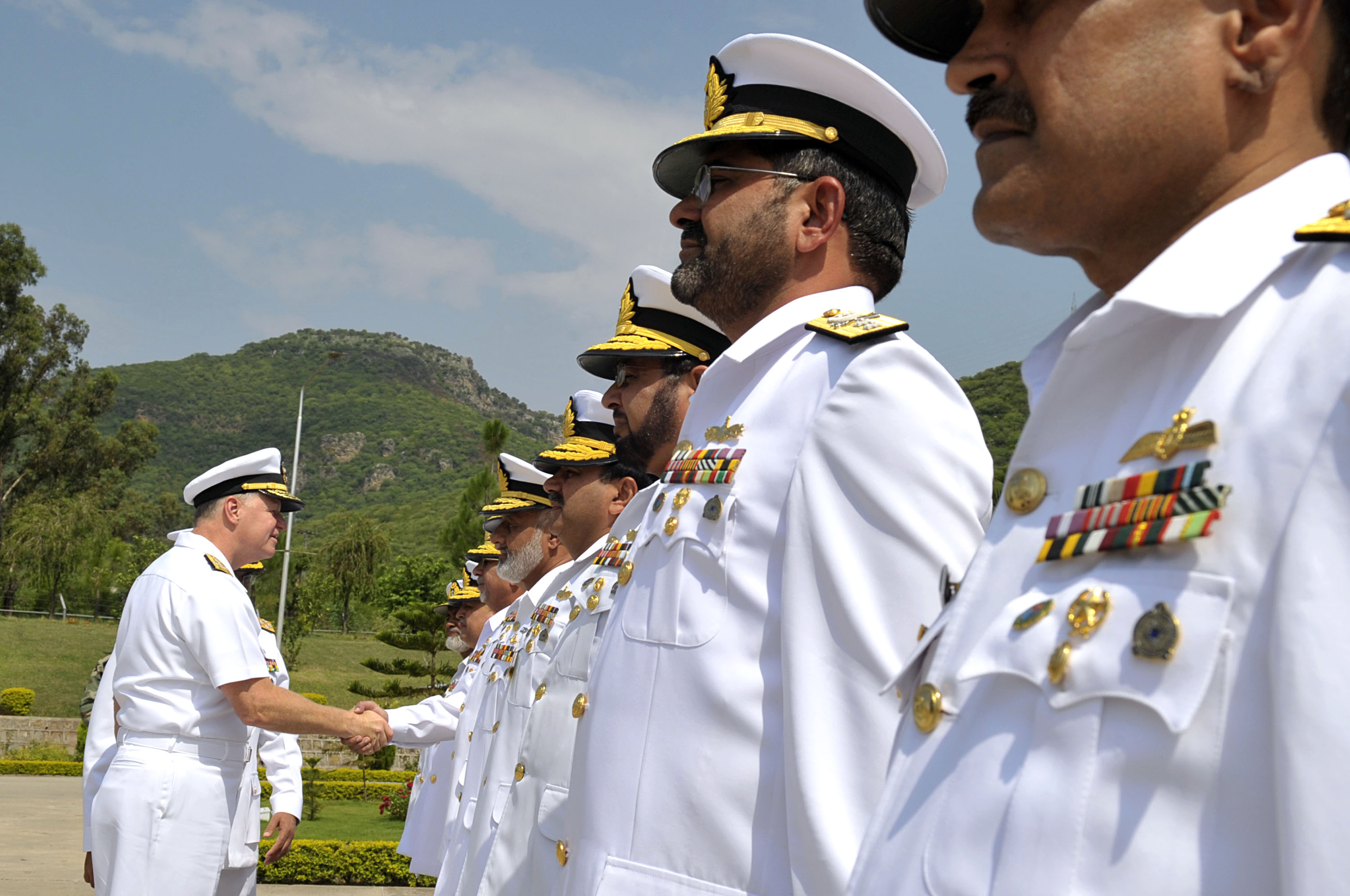
The senior military leadership of the Navy meeting with the U.S. Chief of Naval Operations Adm. Gary Roughead at the Navy NHQ in Islamabad.

Due to the influence from the Royal Navy and later by the United States Navy since its earliest inception, the Pakistan Navy has a unique command structure and the navy's functionality is divided in various branches.

There are seven military staff commands in the navy that are in fact administrative, directed by the several appointed Deputy Chief of the Naval Staff (DCNS) and often assisted by the Assistant Chief of the Naval Staff (ACNS) holding the rank of commodore a one-star rank senior officer reporting directly to their respective Deputy Chief of the Naval Staff (DCNS). The Deputy Chiefs Of Naval Staff are usually holding either the two-star or three-star ranks.The each and appointed Deputy Chief of the Naval Staff head or commander of their respected branch reports directly to the Chief of the Naval Staff (CNS) at Navy NHQ in Islamabad of their respected command.

The military administration of the Navy under the Naval Chief based in the Navy NHQ includes its Principal Staff Commands and Principal Staff Officers:

Principal Staff Commands at NHQ	Call sign	Principal Staff Officers	Notes
Vice Chief of the Naval Staff	VCNS	Vice Admiral Raja Rab Nawaz, HI(M), Ops	The Second in Command of The Pakistan Navy.
Deputy Chief of the Naval Staff (Operations)	DCNS-O	Rear Admiral Shifaat Ali Khan, HI(M), Ops	Head of Operations Branch and Organization in the Pakistan Navy.
Deputy Chief of the Naval Staff (Materials)	DCNS-M	Rear Admiral Javed Zia, SI(M), Engg	Head of Materials Branch and Organization in the Pakistan Navy.
Deputy Chief of the Naval Staff (Supply)	DCNS-S	Vice Admiral Syed Ahmed Salman, HI(M), Supp	Head of Supplies Branch and Organization in the Pakistan Navy.
Deputy Chief of the Naval Staff (Projects)	DCNS-P	Rear Admiral Jawad Ahmed HI(M),Ops	Head of Projects Branch and Organization in the Pakistan Navy.
Deputy Chief of the Naval Staff (Trainning and Personnel)	DCNS-T&P	Rear Admiral Asim Sohail Malik HI(M),Ops	Head of Training and Personnel Branch and Organization in the Pakistan Navy.
Deputy Chief of the Naval Staff (Administration)	DCNS-A	Vice Admiral Syed Ahmed Salman, HI(M), Supp	Head of Administrations Branch and Organization in the Pakistan Navy.
Deputy Chief of the Naval Staff (Welfare and Housing)	DCNS-W&H	Rear Admiral Imtiaz Ali, HI(M) TBT & Bar, Ops	Head of Welfares and Housings Branch and Organization in the Pakistan Navy.

=== Organizations and Heads of Services, Pakistan Navy ===
The Organizations and the Heads of Services operating in the Pakistan Navy and reporting directly to the Naval Chief are as follows:

Organisations	Call sign	Heads of Services
Director General, Naval Research and Development Institute	DG NRDI	Rear Admiral Mazhar Mahmood Malik, HI(M), Engg
Director General, Command, Control, Communication, Computers and Intelligence	DG C4I	Rear Admiral Asim Sohail Malik, HI(M), Ops
Naval Secretariat, Naval Secretary	NS	Rear Admiral Rao Ahmed Imran Anwar SI(M) TBT, Ops
Director General, Naval Intelligence	DG NI	Rear Admiral Shahzad Hamid, HI(M) TBT , Ops
Director General, Public Relations	DG PR	Rear Admiral Ahmed Hussain, SI(M), Ops

=== Naval components and branches ===
Each branch in the navy offers specialisation and officers interested in joining the particular service have to pass aptitude tests before attending the specialised school that usually last for two to three years, in which the officer is able to attain a college degree.

Military administration in the Navy
administrative branches in the Navy	call sign	specialisation and qualification badges	administrative branches in the Navy	call sign	specialisation and qualification badges
Naval Operations	Ops	Surface warfare Underwater warfare Electronic Warfare; Communication; Navigation; NBCD	Naval Supplies	S	Supply Badge
Logistics	Log	Logistics Badge	Mechanical	Mech	Ship Mechanical Engineering Badge
Judge Advocate General Corps	JAG	JAG Badge	Education	Ed	Education Badge
Weapons Engineering Branch	WEB	WEB Badge	Marine Engineering Branch	MEB	Marine Engineering badge
Aviation	AVN	Naval aviator badge	Music	MUS	Music Badge
Medical	MED	Medical Badge	Naval Police	NP	Naval Police Badge
Naval Intelligence	NI	Navy Intelligence Badge	Marines Corps	MC	Marines Badge
Navy SEALs	SSGN	SSGN Badge	Maritime Security Agency	MSA	MSA Badge
Special Branch	SB	IT Badge	Chaplain (Khatib) Service	CS	Chaplain Badge

=== Naval commands in field and commanders ===
Since its restructuring and reorganisation over the several years, the Pakistan Navy now operates eight operational and tactical field commands and also two major type commands, two of the important commands of aviation and submarines are reporting directly to the senior Pakistan Fleet Command. Each command is headed by a senior flag officer who usually holds a ranks of three-star rank: Vice-Admiral and two-star rank: Rear-Admiral. The appointment to the senior fleet commander known as Commander, Pakistan Fleet leads the navy's entire fleet with a responsibility of deploying the entire combat formations of the navy.

Geographically, there are three administrative commanders, such as Commander Karachi (COMKAR), Commander Central Punjab (COMCEP), and Commander Northern (COMNOR), who administer the bulk of naval installations, offshore establishments, and training facilities besides the seven oceanic based commands.

In 2012, the Pakistan Navy established the Naval Strategic Forces Command that has area responsibility of exercising the deployment of sea-borne nuclear weapons and is described by the military as the "custodian of the nation's nuclear second strike capability."

The peacetime commands and the Commands in the Navy allocated are given below.

Operational Commands in the Pakistan Navy
Headquarters	Navy NHQ, Islamabad in Pakistan			
Operational, Tactical and Type Commands	Call sign	Commander	Subordinate combat squadrons and arms	Notes
Commander, Pakistan Fleet	COMPAK	Vice Admiral Abdul Munib, HI(M), Ops	Subordinate squadrons: 25th Destroyer Squadron; 18th Destroyer Squadron; 9th Auxiliary Squadron; 21st Auxiliary Squadron; 10th Patrol Squadron; Fast Patrol Squadron; Commander Naval Aviation- COMNAV; Commander Submarines- COMSUBS	The war-fighting command responsible for operational deployments of the Surface, Submarine, and Aviation Commands to ensure the operational readiness and assurances of the Navy.
Commander Karachi	COMKAR	Vice Admiral Muhammad Faisal Abbasi, HI(M), Ops	Subordinate offshore establishments: PNS Bahadur– Submarine school; PNS Himalaya– Boot camp; PNS Karsaz; PNS Rahat; Pakistan Naval Academy; PNS Rahnuma – HR Department; PNS Shifa; School of Logistics and Management; PNS Nigraan – Naval Police HQ	Directs the offshore establishments, training schools, military protocol, and ensuring coastal defence of Karachi coast.
Commander, Coast	COMCOAST	Vice Admiral Faisal Amin, HI(M), Ops	Subordinate branches: COS Marines Corps; Naval Observatory; PNS Iqbal; PNS Qasim; Marines Base Sir Creek; Manora Base; Pakistan Naval Air Defense	Directs the coastal command by ensuring the coastal defences of Pakistan from Iranian border in West to Indian borders in East.
Commander, Naval Strategic Forces Command	CDR NSFC	Vice Admiral Abdul Samad, HI(M), Ops	Subordinate commands: Navy Special Service Group; Deployment of seaborne-nuclear weapons	This command was identified by the military as Custodian of nuclear second strike capability
Commander, Logistics (Logistics Command)	COMLOG	Rear Admiral Mazhar Mahmood Malik, HI(M), Engg	Subordinate commands: Naval Dockyard; Weapons Depot; PNS Dilawar– Logistics Base; Commander Depot– COMDEP	Directs the logistics command to oversee the maintenance, military logistics and material readiness for construction warships at the shipyard.
Flag Officer, Sea Training	FOST	Rear Admiral Khyber Zaman, HI(M), Ops		This Command oversees the training deployment of the Pakistan Navy Fleet
Commander, Central Punjab	COMCEP	Rear Admiral Sohail Ahmed Azmie, HI(M), Ops		Oversees the deployments of Marine detachment and operations of the War College in Punjab
Commander, West	COMWEST	Rear Admiral Tasawar Iqbal, SI(M), Ops		Directs the Navy's combat units in the Western Pakistan. Subordinate commands: Pakistan Naval War College– Lahore; PNS Punjab
Commander, North	COMNOR	Rear Admiral Saqib Ilyas SI(M), Ops -		Directs the Navy's combat units in Northern Pakistan and reports to Principal Staff Commands at NHQ.
Commander, Depot	COMDEP	Commodore Fareed Amin SI(M), Supp		Directs the Naval Depots Command to oversee all the naval supplies and materials being stored and distributed in the Pakistan Navy and reporting directly to COMLOG
Commander, Naval Aviation	COMNAV	Commodore Faheem Abbasi, Ops		Directs the Naval Aviation Command but reporting directly to COMPAK
Commander, Submarines	COMSUBS	Commodore Syed Ailya Hasan, SI(M), SBT, Ops		Directs the Submarine Command but reporting directly to COMPAK
Director of Procurement, Navy	DP NAVY	Commodore Adeel Qureshi SI(M), Supp -		This Command deals in the purchasing of certain military equipments and supplies for the navy and reports to DCNS-S

=== Special operations forces ===
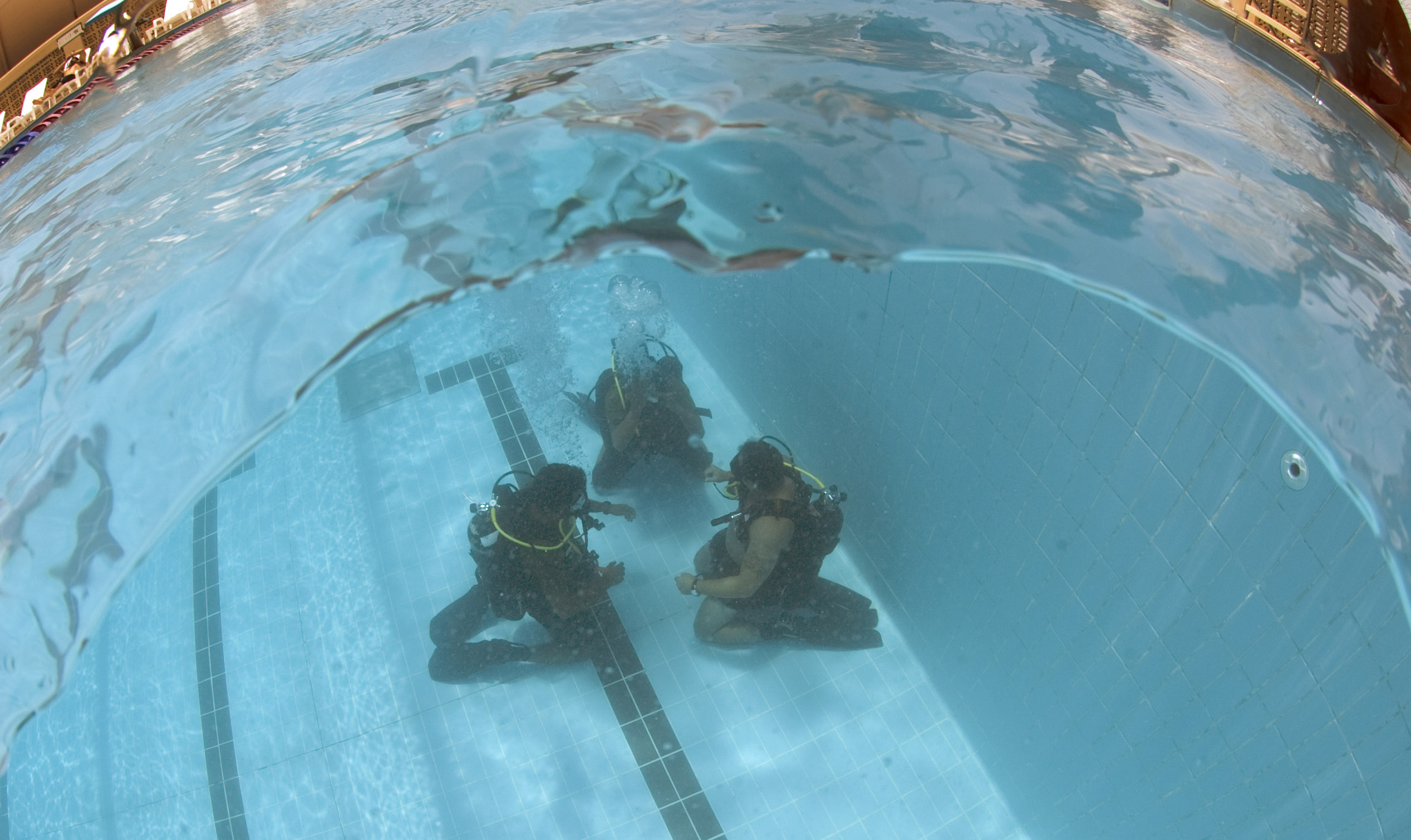
The Navy SSG conducting the force-protection and underwater special forces training with their United States Navy counterparts, the U.S. Navy SEALs in 2011.

The Special Service Group Navy (SSG(N)), colloquially known as the SSGN is an elite unit that conducts unconventional warfare, combat diving, naval interdiction, and asymmetric warfare operations, established under the guidance of the United States Navy's SEALs in 1966.

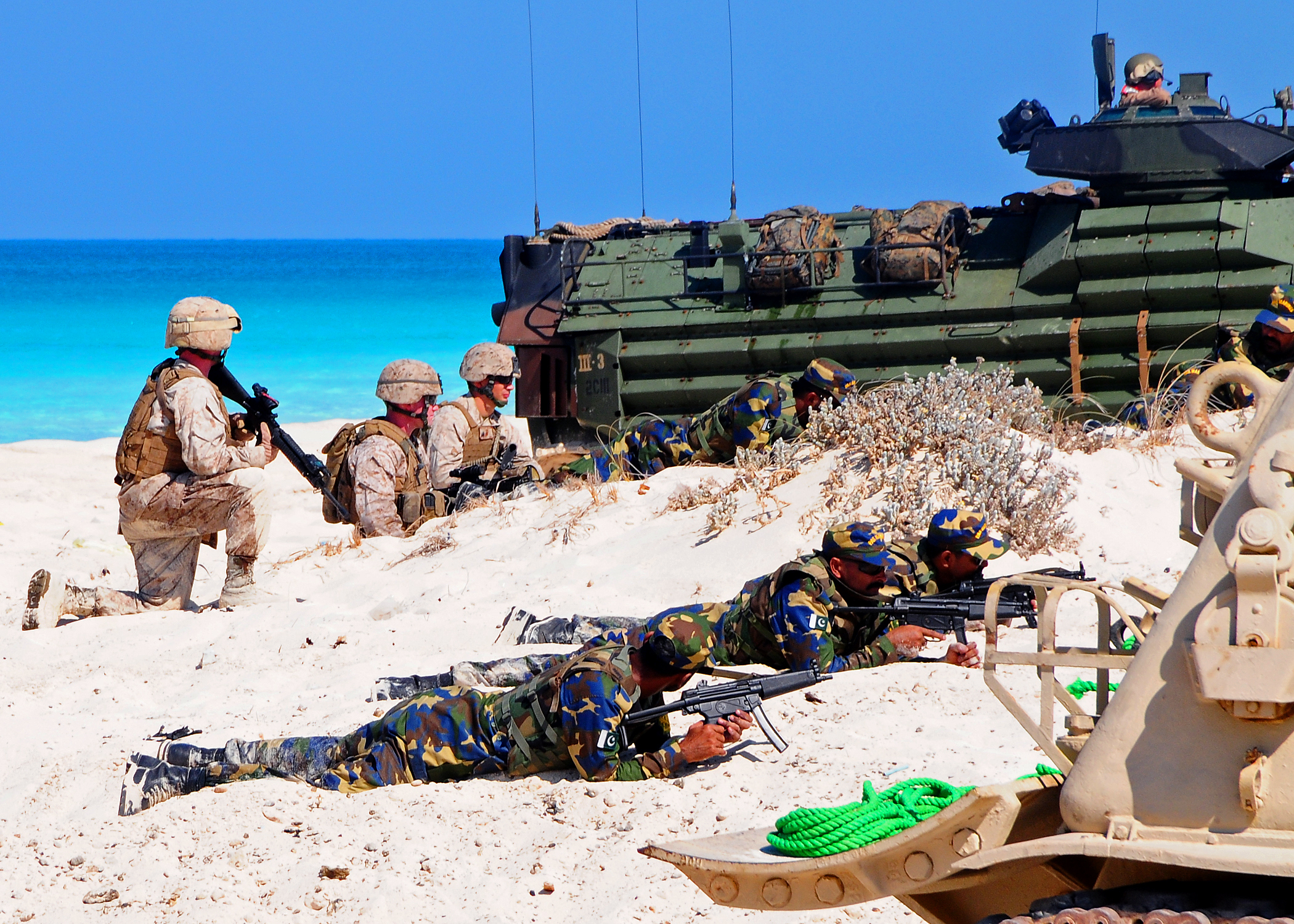
Pakistan Marines dressed in operational camouflage uniforms, during training with the United States Marine Corps in Alexandria in 2009.

The Navy Special Service Group is headquartered at PNS Iqbal in Karachi where the physical conditioning and weapon tactics training take place. The Navy Special Service Group's specialisation further includes training and mastery in the visit, board, search, and seizure methods, naval interdiction, and security operations to prevent seaborne-based terrorism.

The Navy Special Service Group is a tighter unit composed of highly qualified and selected personnel who are modelled on and inspired by the U.S. Navy SEALs training and tradition. The actual number of personnel of Navy Special Service Group is classified and their deployment are also subjected to classified information.

In 1970–71, the Navy established the Pakistan Marines to support the amphibious warfare operations and were initially influenced by the United States Marines Corps but the Marines component was decommissioned by the federal government in 1974. On 14 April 1990, the Pakistan Marines were again recommissioned in the Navy with about 2,000 personnel. The advanced training of the Marines are often takes place with the Pakistan Army at their School of Infantry and Tactics in Quetta in Balochistan.

The 1st Marines Battalion, the special operation unit, of the Pakistan Marines is specifically trained by the Pakistan Army to conduct infiltration and anti-aircraft warfare operations. The 1st Battalion is currently deployed in Sir Creek.

== Military philosophy ==
=== Combat doctrine ===
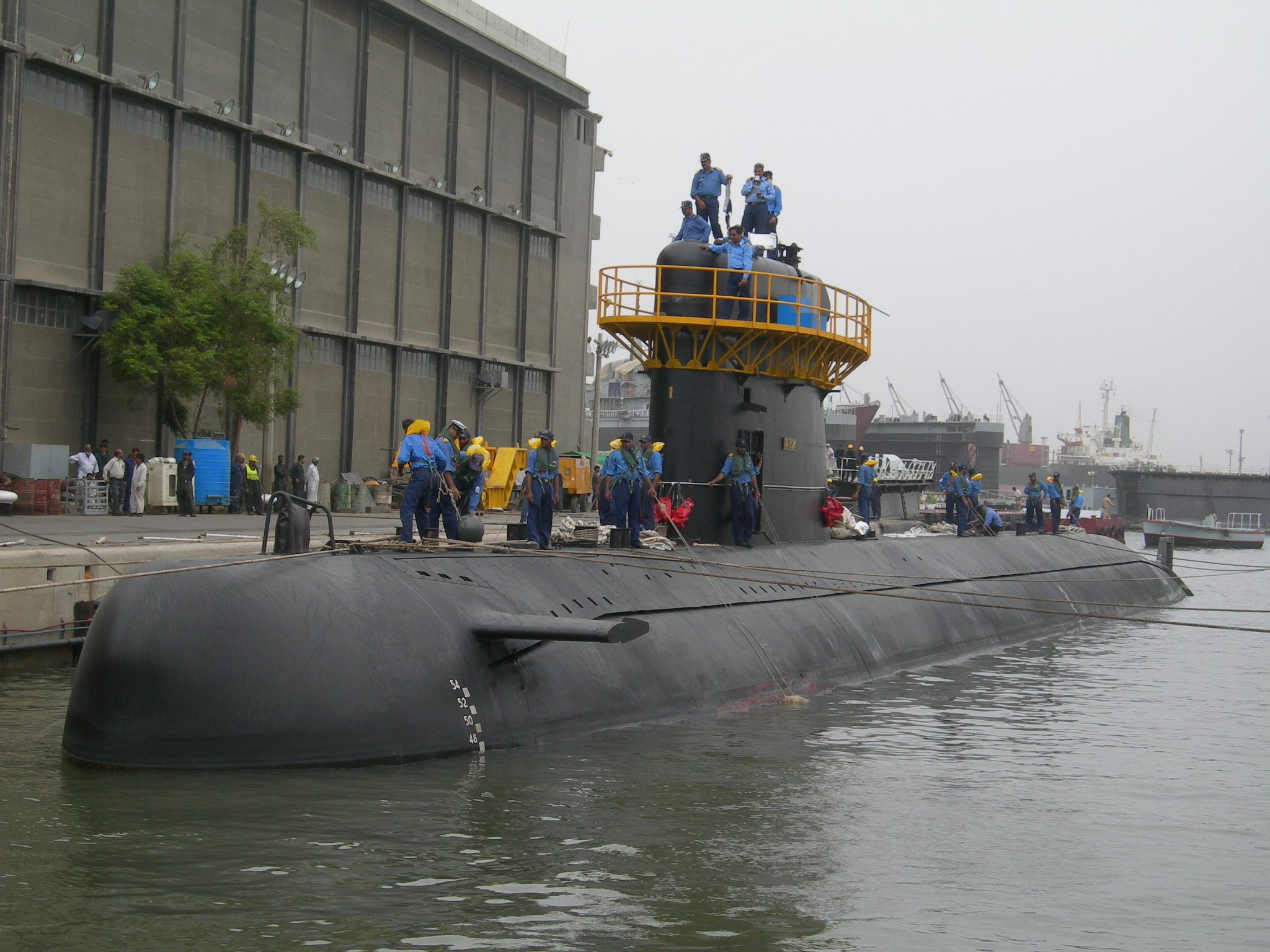
PNS Hamza, the air-independent powered Agosta 90B-class submarine, being prepared to go through the depth tests in 2007. The Agosta 90B submarines are capable of launching the nuclear-based cruise missiles from an underwater platform.

The military doctrine and philosophy of the Pakistan Navy is primarily directed towards preventing the Indian Navy repeating the 1971 blockade of the Pakistani coasts. From 1947 until 1971, the Pakistan Navy was effectively little more than a coast guard because the Government of Pakistan did not give importance to the strategy of protecting the sea lines of communication. In 1971, the Indian Navy ultimately played a decisive role by enforcing a blockade of Chittagong and Karachi, the only maritime outlets of East Pakistan and West Pakistan respectively. The Navy was unable to break the blockade leading to Pakistan's economic and military resources being severely drained and communication was limited between the two wings of the country. Subsequently, the federal government increased the funding of the Navy.

Since 1971 the Navy tactical doctrine has included the acquisition, development, employment, and aggressive deployment of the long-range and depth reaching submarines in an effort to target and destroy its adversaries by attacking surface warships before reaching the country's ports. The mining of the Karachi's harbour is also taken as a serious consideration of preventing the enemy from launching the missile attacks in the port city of Karachi.

In 1983–85, the Navy commissioned the Dassault Mirage 5 from France whose weapon system included the naval variant of the Exocet missiles and are aimed towards engaging the Indian Navy's aircraft out to 500 kilometres (310 mi) in the Indian Ocean.

The routine deployment of the surface fleet as part of the Combined Task Forces provides the opportunity to the safeguard the sealines of communications. Since 1999, the Pakistan Marines's special reconnaissance forces has been deployed in the Sir Creek region are aimed towards offshore protection against the incursions from the Indian Army's Para Commandos from the sea while taking the initiatives of deployment of the special forces groups behind the enemy lines through insertion by the HALO/HAHO airdrop or by using the midget submarines.

Responding to the development of the INS Arihant, the Pakistan Navy reportedly announced the launch of the nuclear powered submarine program to counter the submarine threat in 2012.

The Navy eventually pushed for attaining the naval-based nuclear second-strike capability in 2017 when the ISPR announced the Pakistan Navy's to have attained the sea-based second strike capability when it launched the nuclear SLCM based on the Babur cruise missile, though the range of the SLCM remains to be at the short range.

== Equipment ==
=== Ships: Surface combatants ===
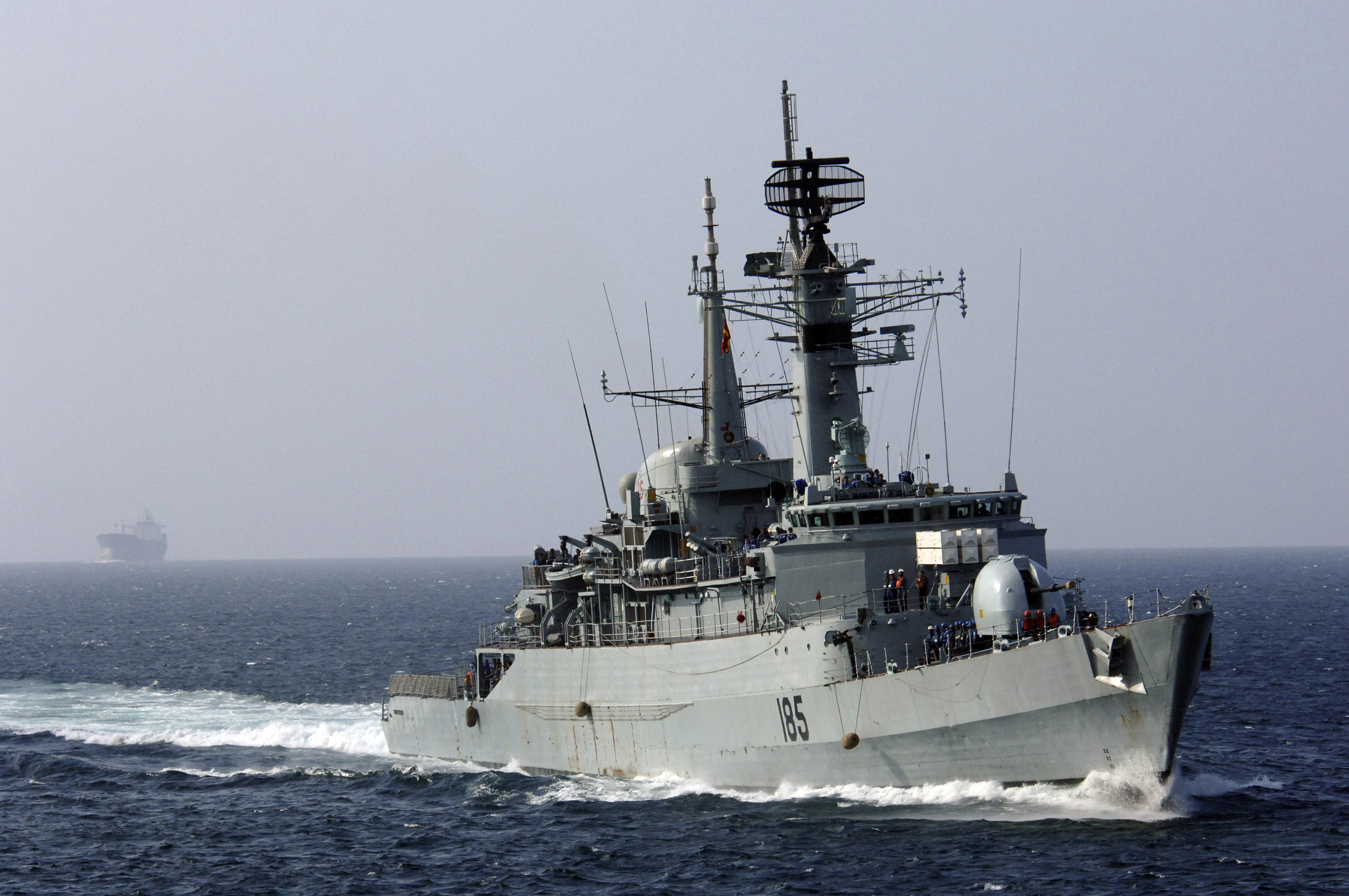
The Tariq-class guided missile frigate, former British general purpose frigates that underwent major refitting and overhauling in 2002

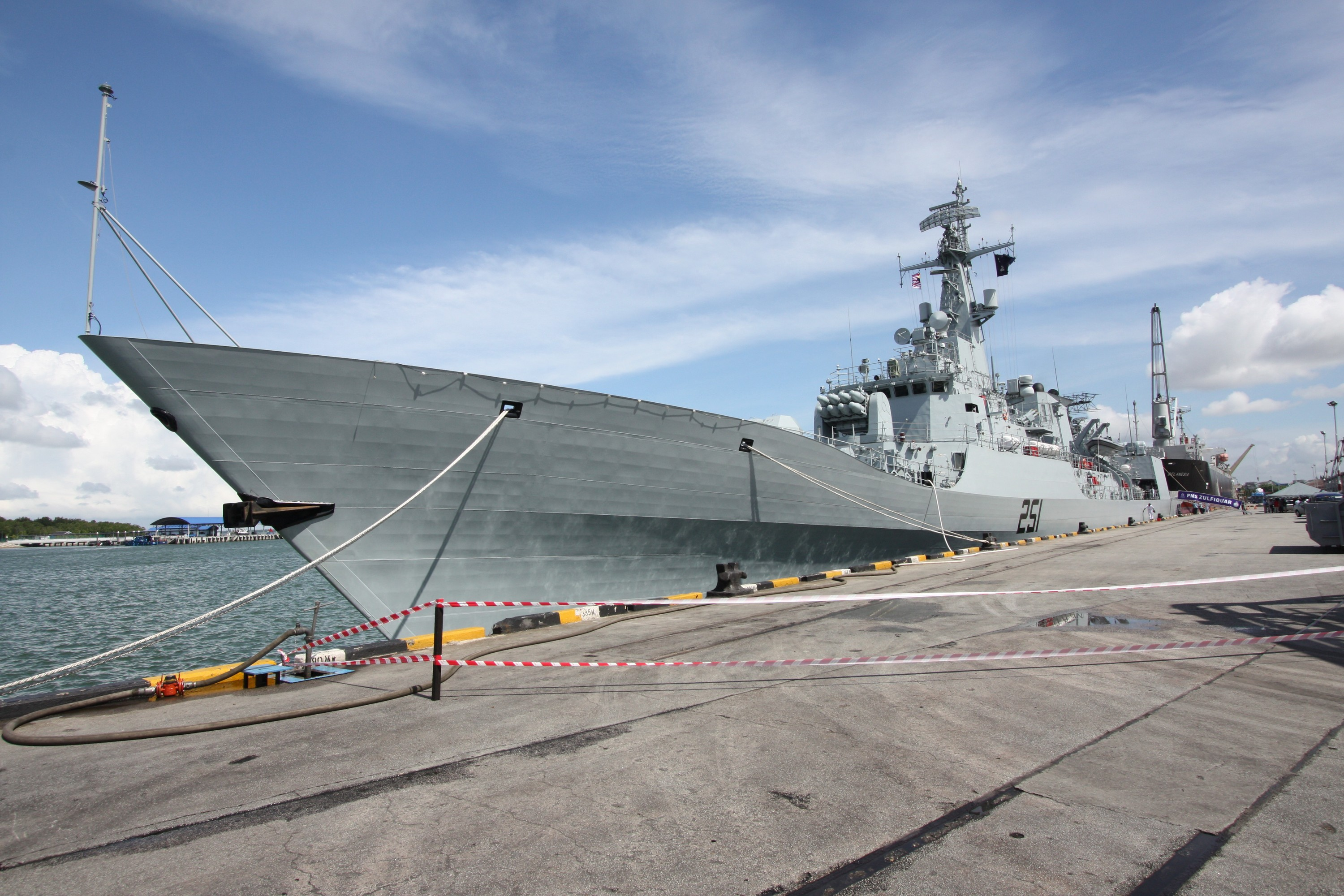
The F-22P Zulfiquar-class guided missile frigates, designed and constructed with a joint venture with China and Pakistan in 2008

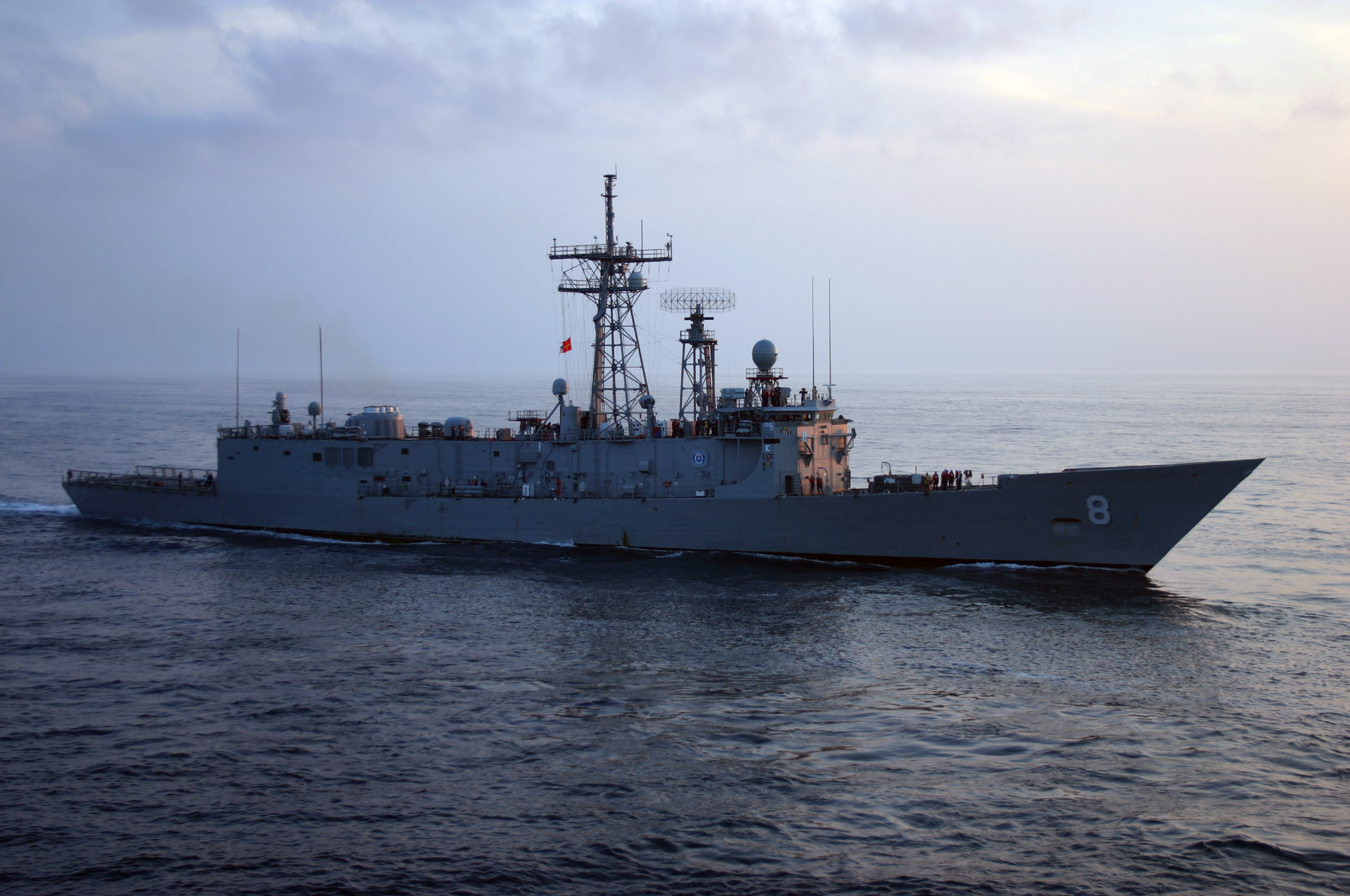
USS McInerney in 2004. She is now known as PNS Alamgir after a major refit and overhaul in 2010.

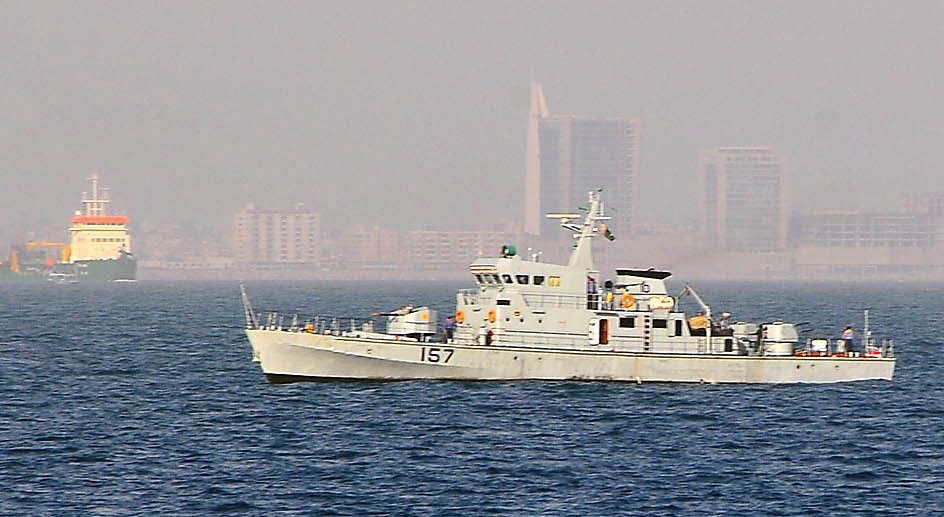
PNS Larkana patrolling off the Karachi coast in 2009. She is the lead ship of the Larkana–class missile boats.

The names of the commissioned warship and noncombat vessels of the Pakistan Navy are prefixed with the capital letters "PNS"— the Pakistan Navy Ship. The naming convention of the ship is selected by the Ministry of Defense, often honouring important people or places in the history of Pakistan, and then commissioned by the President of Pakistan.

The Surface Fleet, established in 1947, is a pivotal component of the Navy with a crucial role in maintaining the military balance with the Indian Navy in the Indian Ocean, taking part in multinational task forces to prevent seaborne terrorism and piracy.

The Navy currently operates approximately 100 vessels including ones used by the Maritime Security Agency (MSA) and Pakistan Marines. In the current inventory, the Navy has a combination of Turkish, American, Chinese and locally produced ships including the American Oliver Hazard Perry-class frigate, Turkish-designed Babur class, and locally-built Zulfiquar-class frigate (built with Chinese assistance). Decommissioning of the ageing Tariq class destroyer has been completed after the construction of additional missile guided Zulfiquar-class frigates in Pakistan by 2021 and the acquisition of the Type 054A frigates from China that started in 2017.

The Tariq class were a class of guided missile destroyers that were in service with the 25th Destroyer Squadron. The F-22P Zulfiquar class guided missile frigates are attached with the 18th Destroyer Squadron with a complement of the American-transferred USS McInerney (now PNS Alamgir) in 2011.

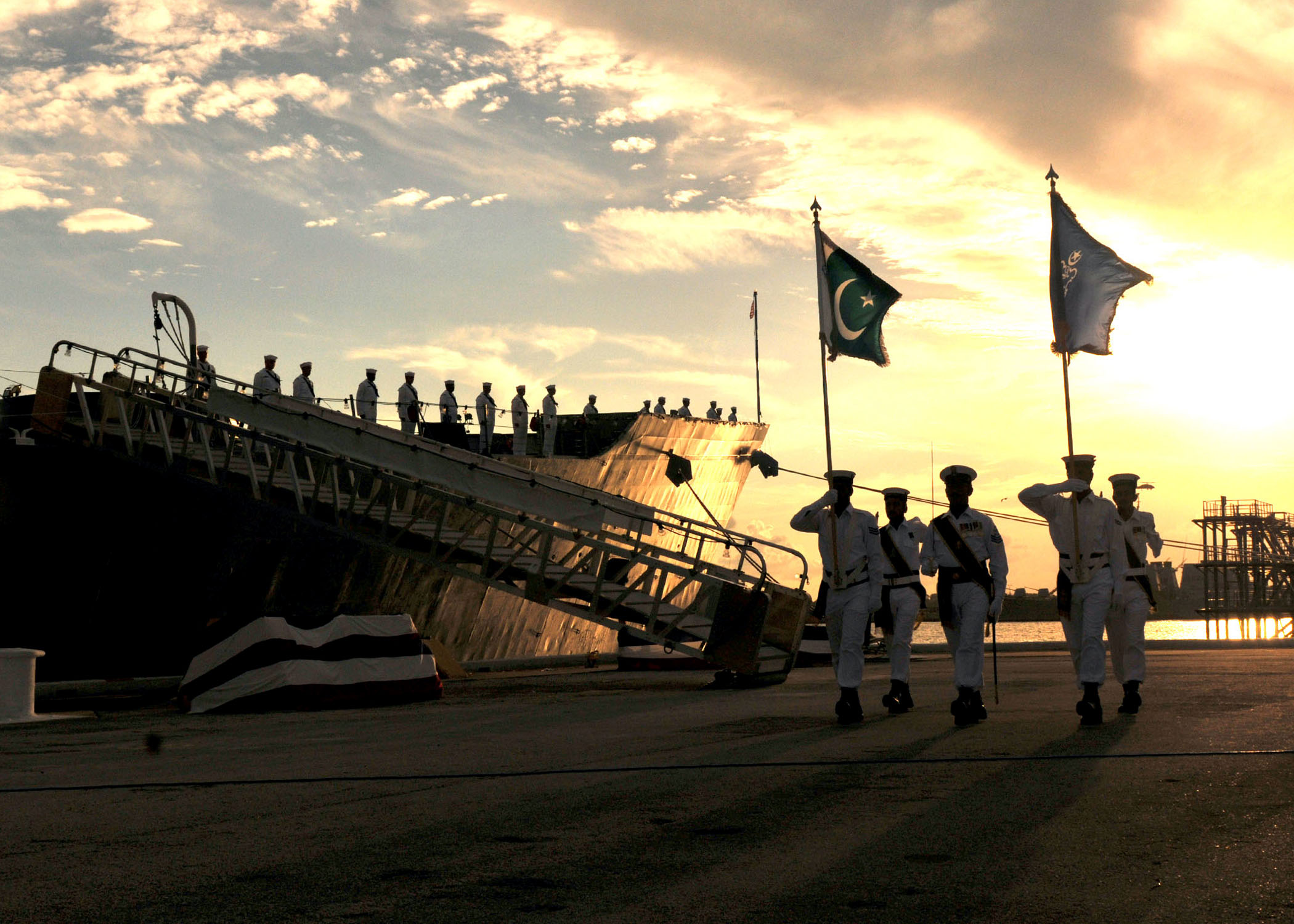
PNS Alamgir (former USS McInerney), being handed over to Pakistan Navy on 31 August 2010 at the Naval Station Mayport in Florida

In 1992, the French Navy transferred its Tripartite-class minehunter and helped design the Munsif-class minehunters in Pakistan as a local production that increased the Pakistan Navy's operational scope and its overall capabilities.

In 2011, the Navy commissioned the Azmat-class corvette based on the Chinese design of Type 037II Houjian missile boat with the lead boat being designed in China while the remaining three were built in Pakistan through the technology transfer agreement– these missile boats are commissioned into the 10th Patrol Squadron. In addition, the 10th Patrol Squadron has commissioned the two Jurrat-class missile boats based on the German-designed and two missile boat based on a Turkish design, MRTP. The Larkana-class gunboats are locally produced at the KSEW Ltd. in Karachi that is in the current service with the Pakistan Navy, forming the Fast Patrol Craft Squadron.

In addition to the Navy's operations of warships, the Navy operates coast guard ships intended for the Maritime Security Agency – most are imported from China while others are locally built to guard Pakistan's seaborne borders from illegal activities, followed by ten of the locally designed and built patrol boats for the Coast Guards for the safety and policing of the beaches in the country.

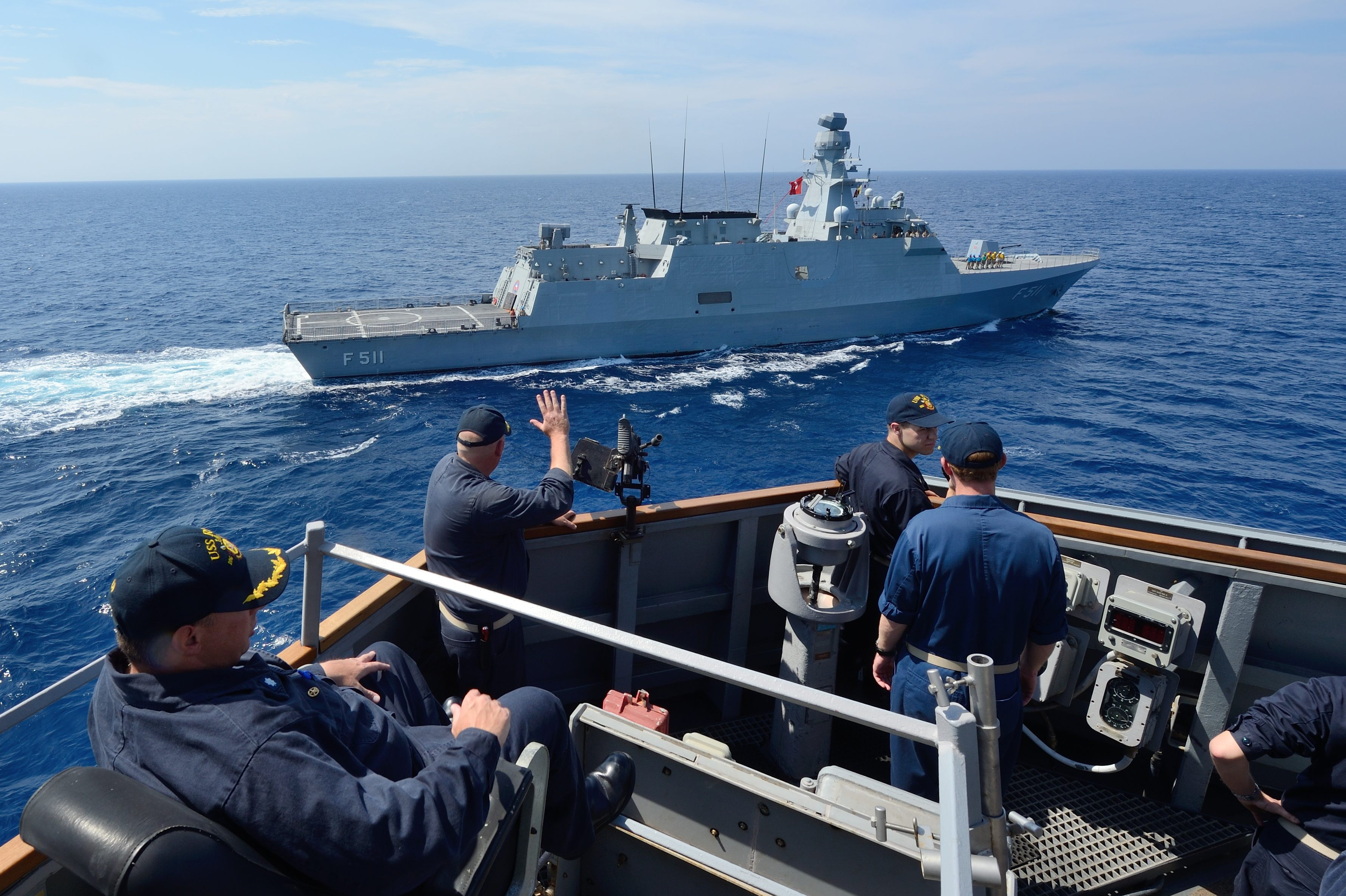
TCG Heybeliada in the Mediterranean Sea

In 2017, the Pakistan Navy entered in discussions with the Turkish Navy to acquire four of the MILGEM-class warship, and eventually signing a major defence deal based on a technology transfer with Turkey on 5 July 2018, which was described as "the largest defense export of Turkey in one agreement."

The Pakistan Navy Fleet Tanker Project (PNFT), of which STM, one of Turkey's leading companies in the defence industry, is the prime contractor, joined the Pakistan Navy in 2018.

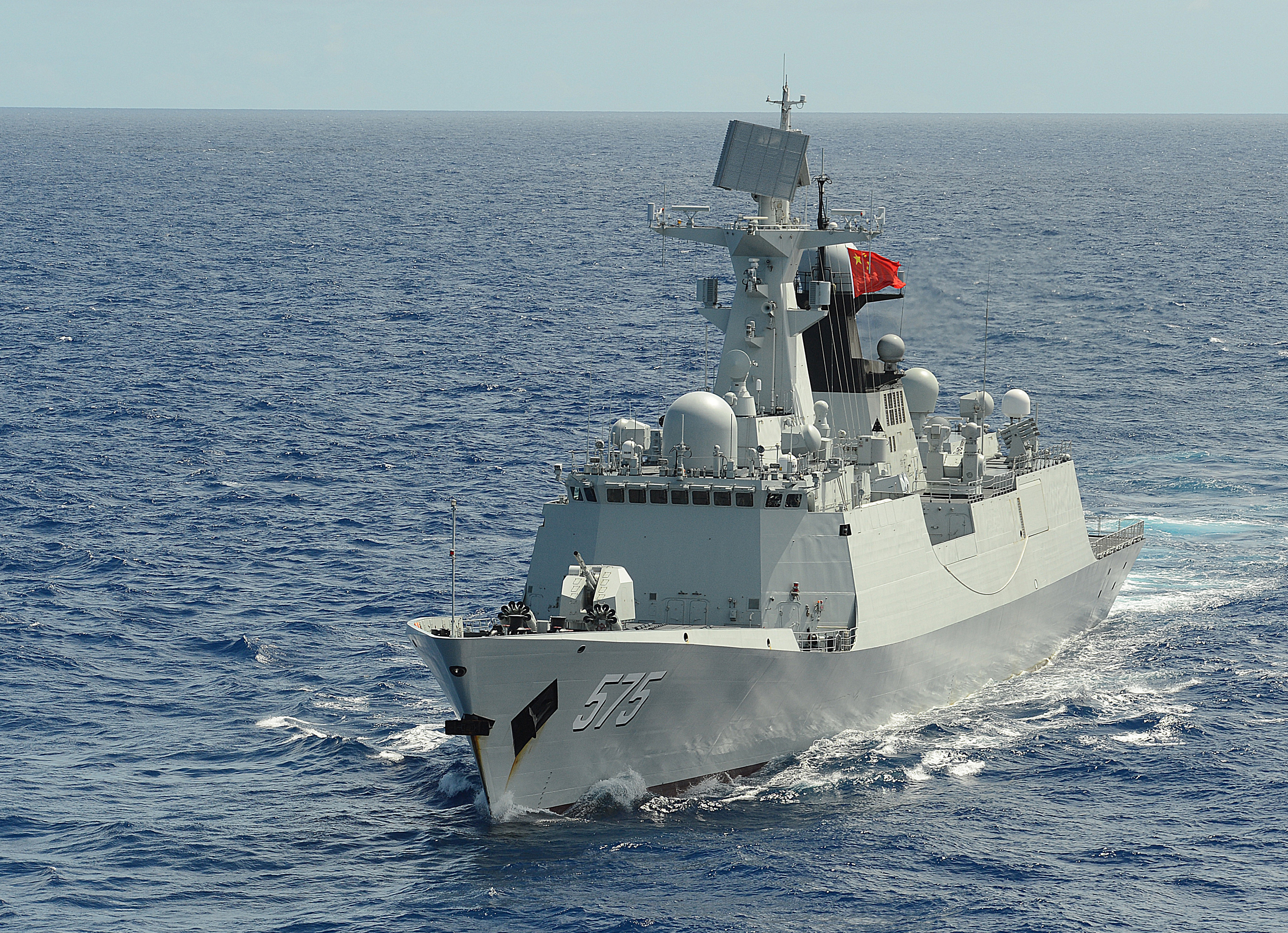
Chinese Type 054A frigates

On 1 June 2018, Pakistan Navy ordered four Type 054As. The ships are expected to enter service by 2021.

The steel-cutting ceremony for the second Type 054A frigate for the Pakistan Navy (PN) was held in China on 19 December 2018, marking the beginning of construction of the vessel at the Hudong-Zhonghua shipyard in Shanghai, China.

On 1 November 2019, China's Hudong-Zhonghua Shipbuilding held a steel cutting ceremony for the Pakistan Navy's third and fourth Type 054A frigates.

Pakistan Navy outgoing Chief of Naval Staff (CNS) Admiral Zafar Mahmood Abbasi said Navy will add more than 50 vessels, including 20 major ships, to its fleet as part of an ambitious modernisation plan to improve its capabilities.

Navy would operate four modified Ada class corvettes from Turkey, two multi-purpose Yarmook class corvettes built by Dutch shipbuilder Damen Shipyards and twenty fast attack missile boats.

=== Submarines ===
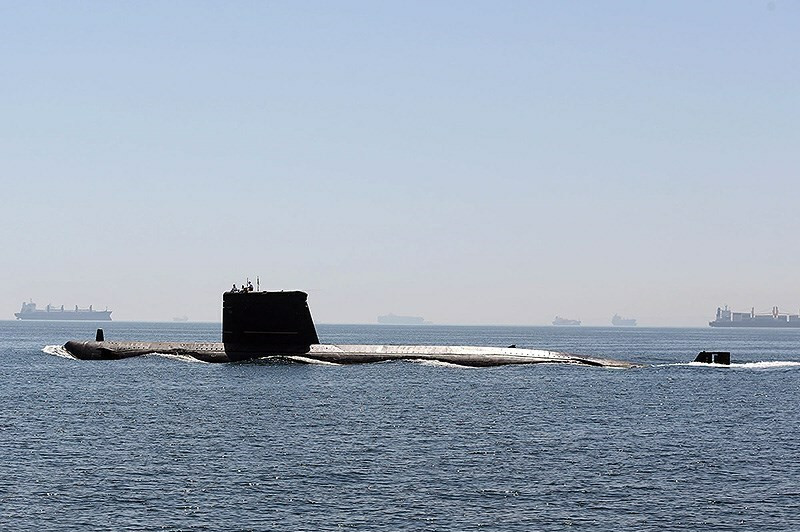
PNS Hashmat in the Persian Gulf in 2014

Established in 1964, the Submarine Command is a major component of the Navy whose primary mission is to conduct clandestine military reconnaissance for intelligence and carry out precision strikes on enemy positions from underwater during war.

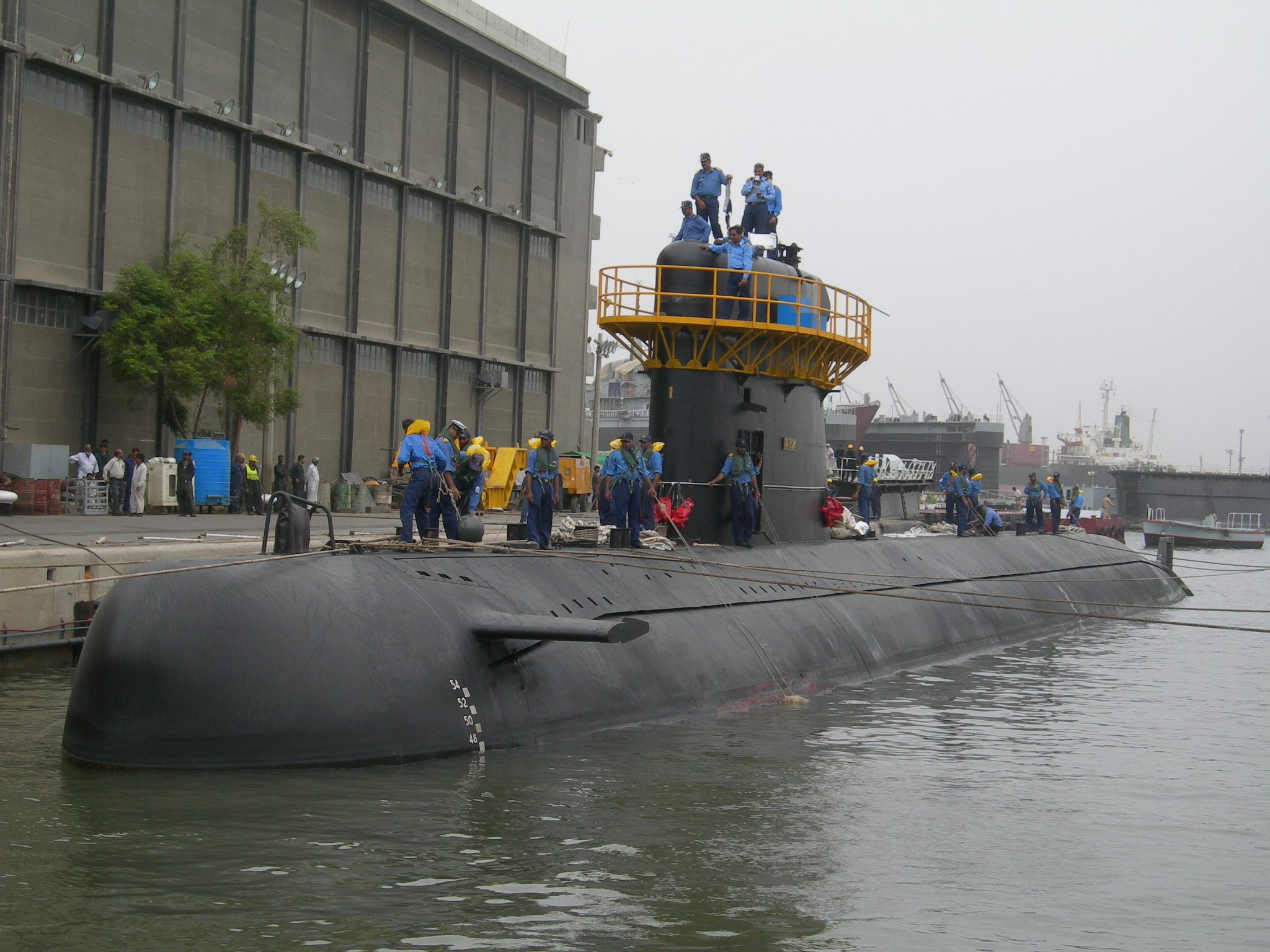
PNS Hamza, an air-independent-powered Agosta 90B-class submarine, being prepared to go through the depth tests in 2007

There are eight submarines in active service including the Hashmat-class submarines, based on the Agosta-70A class, and three Italian–designed and locally–built midget Cosmos-class (designated as X-Craft) submarines. The submarines are powered with diesel-electric and air-independent propulsion.

The Agosta-class submarines are equipped with an air-independent propulsion system giving a capability of deeper dives and the ability to submerge for a longer period of time without detection. They are armed with Exocet and Babur-III missiles, which can be launched from underwater. Two of the three Agosta-90B class have undergone refitting and modernisation by the Turkish firm, STM.

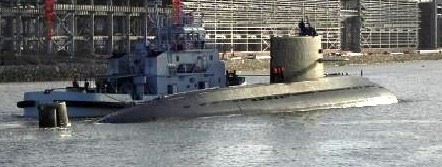
Yuan class diesel electric submarine

In 2014, Pakistan Navy entered in defence discussions with the People's Liberation Army Navy for the procurement of the Yuan-class AIP powered submarines, and eventually succeeded when the technology transfer agreement was signed between two nations in April 2015. This national submarine program is known as Hangor-class submarine features air-independent propulsion is being constructed as a joint-venture with China with the expectation of being commissioned between 2023 and 2028. In a direct response to INS Arihant, the Pakistan Navy eventually succeeded getting the proposal approved for building the nuclear-powered submarine whose delivery is expected to between 2028, according to the Pakistan Navy officials.

In April 2014, the Navy announced that submarine operations would move from Naval Base Karachi to the new Jinnah Naval Base in Ormara.

Submarine training takes place at PNS Abdoze in Karachi. In May 2008, the Navy established the Fleet Acoustic Research and Classification Centre to validate submarine safety standards and to act as an underwater listening post to track unauthorised submarines.

=== Auxiliaries, mine countermeasures, and amphibious warfare ===
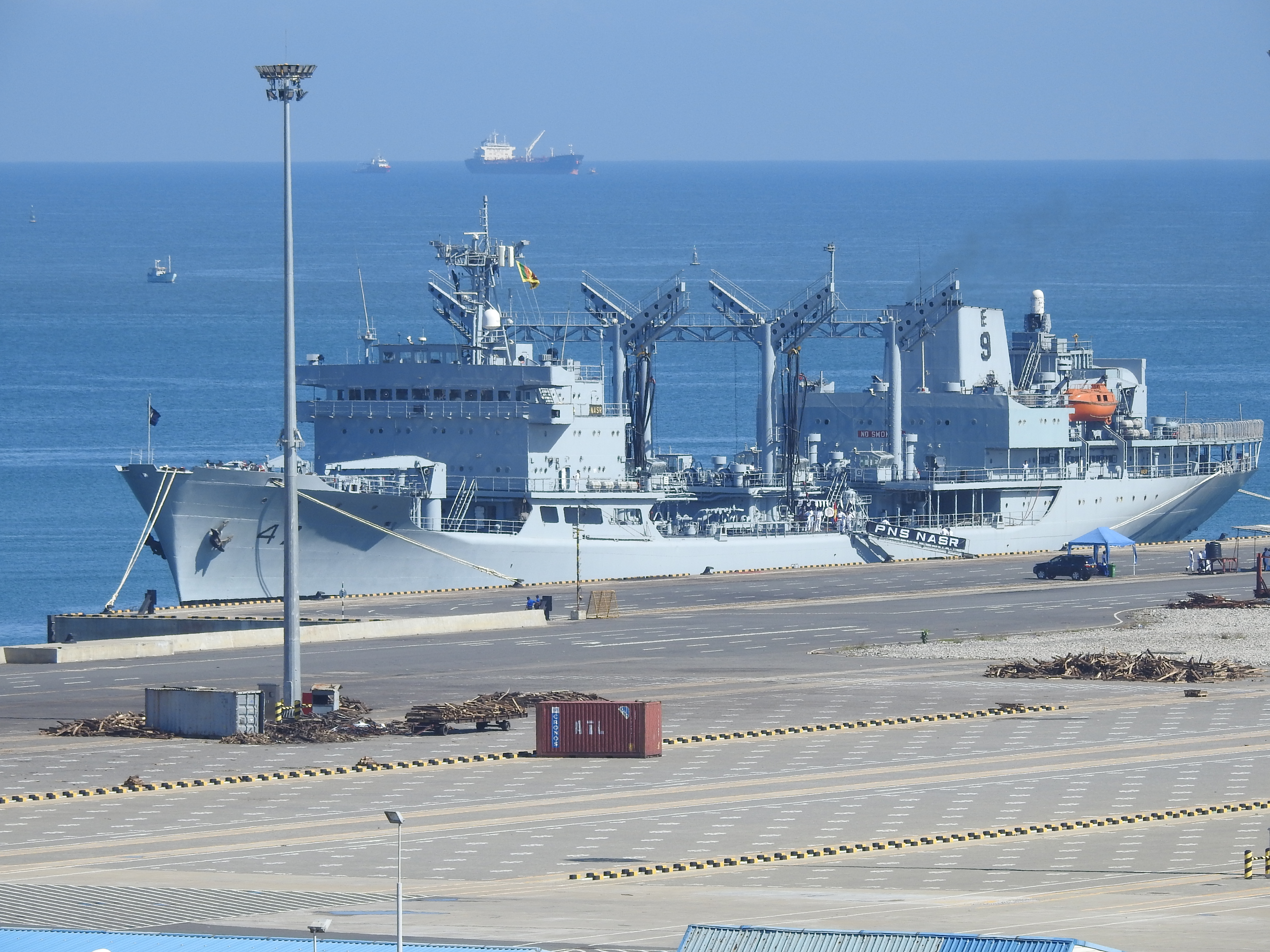
PNS Nasr in Colombo Harbour, Sri Lanka in 2017

The Navy has six replenishment oil tankers, three minehunters, and four Griffon 2000TD hovercraft for the amphibious warfare. The Landing Craft Mechanized (LCM) are the important centre pieces for the amphibious operations undertaken by the Marines and expeditionary actions by the Army as two of the LCMs were commissioned by the Navy after being handed over by the KSEW Ltd. in 2016. On 30th June 2025, Pakistan Navy got three more hovercraft that were formerly in service with the Royal Marines and were decommissioned from service in 2021. Griffon Marine Support got a contract from UK's Defence Equipment & Support (DE&S) in 2022 to refurbish and prepare the hovercraft for the transfer.

In 1987, the Pakistan Navy commissioned PNS Nasr, the Fuqing-class, fleet tanker from China that was followed by the commissioning of PNS Moawin (A20), of the Poolster class, from the Royal Netherlands Navy in 1988. In 1995, Poolster-class PNS Moawin was subjected to a serious fire accident that claimed valuable life during the refitting of the vessel in Karachi. The Navy also operates two coastal tankers that were indigenously designed and locally built at the Karachi Shipyard— PNS Gwadar and PNS Kalmat— commissioned in 1984 and in 1992. In 2011, the Navy commissioned two more small tankers/utility ships (STUS) —PNS Madadgar and PNS Rasadgar —to support the logistics and marine operations in the open sea.

Auxiliaries, mine countermeasures, and amphibious warfare
PNS Rah Naward, a tall ship purchased from the British Royal Navy in 2010

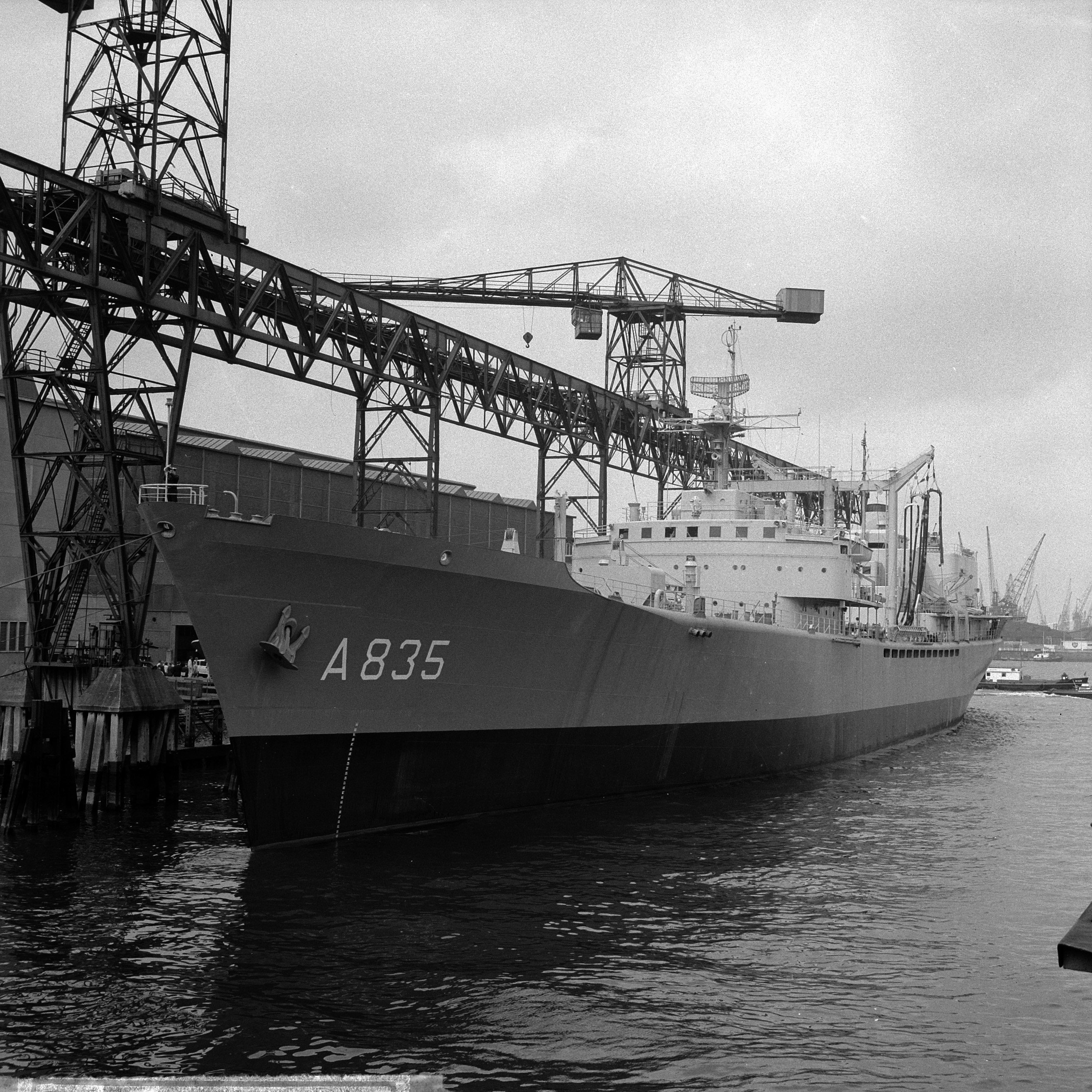
The Poolster-class PNS Moawin

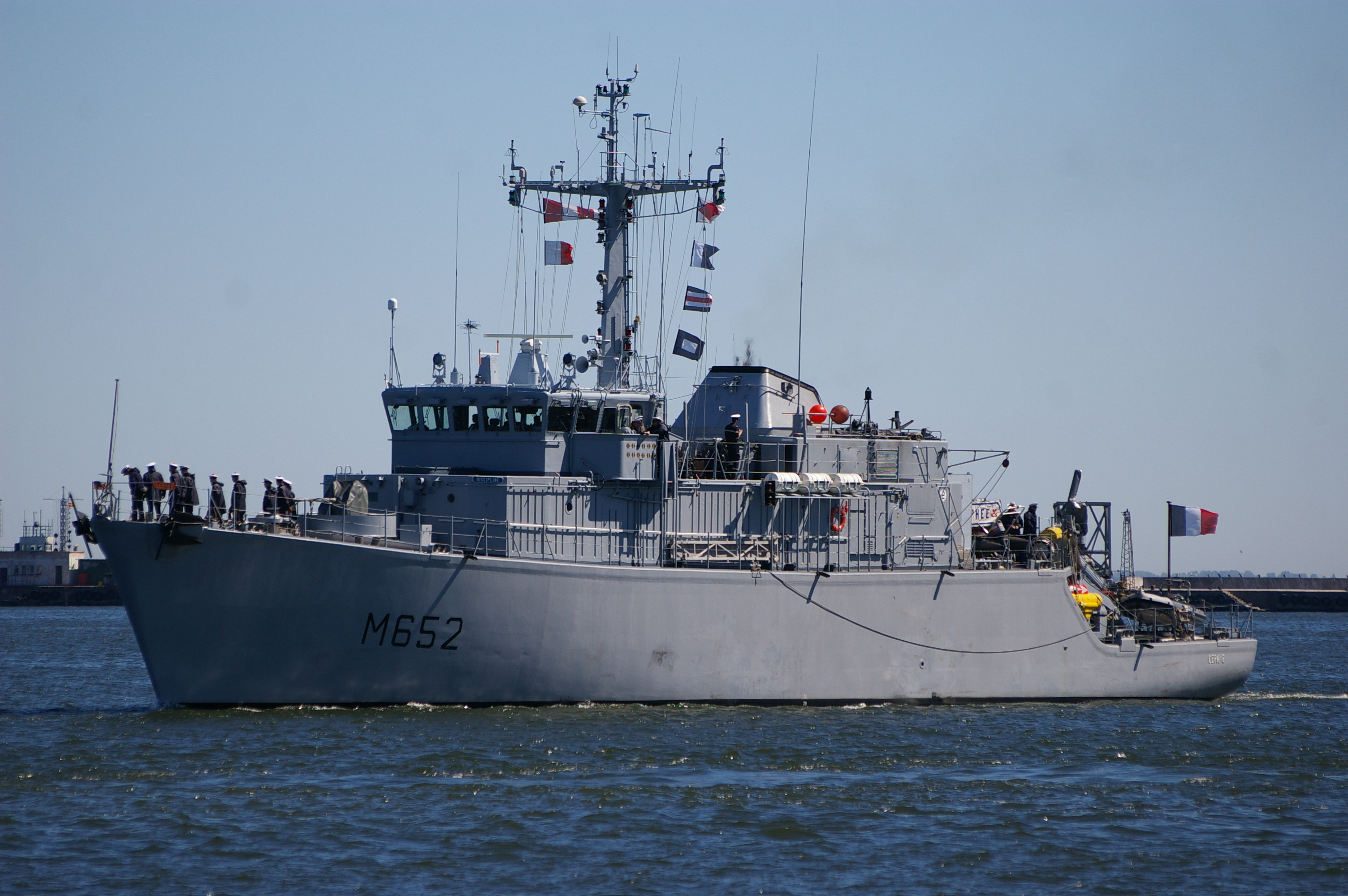
The French Navy's Céphée. PNS Munsif is nearly identical to the one shown in the photo.

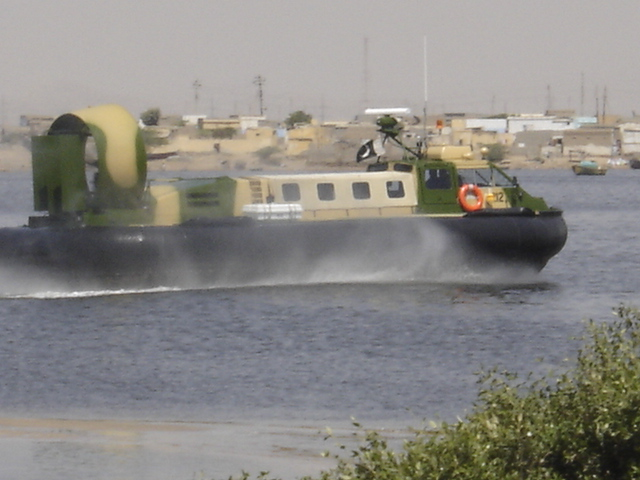
The Griffon 2000TD hovercraft of the Pakistan Marines in Karachi in 2006

In 1992, the Navy increased its operational capabilities in mine countermeasures with the commissioning of PNS Munsif from the French Navy, followed by the technology transfer to Pakistan which led the commissioning of two more mine countermeasure vessels from Munsif-class minehunter in 1996 and 1998. Together with the Munsif-class minehunters and the replenishment oil tankers, these classes of ships are commissioned and complemented in the 9th Auxiliary Squadron. In 2018, the Pakistan Navy commissioned another PNS Moawin (A39) which was locally engineered and constructed from the crucial design guidance from Turkey – the fleet tanker is noted for being the largest warship ever built in Pakistan.

In 2011, the Pakistan Navy established the 21st Auxiliary Squadron to further support its fleet's logistics operations to fulfill the requirements of hydrological survey in the ocean, and the dredging operations in the area of responsibility that includes the training requirements for the Pakistan Navy's personnel at the deeper ocean which is conducted by a dedicated Sail Training Vessel. The 21st Auxiliary Squadron consists of PNS Rah Naward, a tall ship acquired from the United Kingdom in 2010, PNS Behr Khusha, a dredging vessel commissioned from China in 2008, and PNS Behr Paima, that was commissioned from Japan in 1983.

=== Aircraft ===
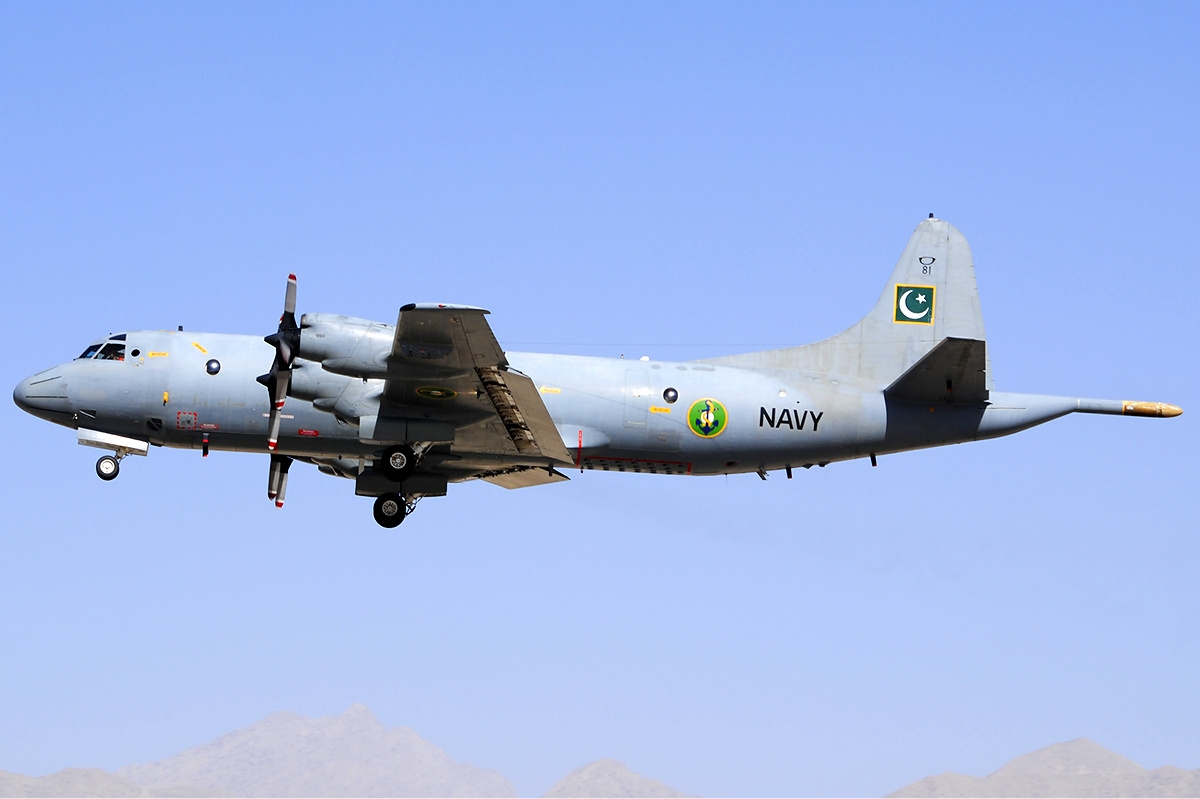
Naval Air Arm Maritime patrol P-3C Orion take off (2010)

The Aircraft in the Pakistan Navy provides the logistical support to the navy's readiness at all level of commands and serves as the supply platform, through helicopters, to conduct the search and rescue, special operations, anti-submarine warfare (ASW), and the anti-surface warfare (ASuW). Unlike the Indian Navy, the Pakistan Navy does not have the rapid aircraft carrier based strike capability but relies its aerial strike operations from clear and traditionally long landing platform built at the Mehran Naval Air Station in Karachi. After realising the failure to protect the harbour from the attacks of the Indian Navy in 1971, the Navy took the research on using the aircraft on sea in an attempt to lessen the dependence on the Pakistan Air Force, which already covers the airspace of Pakistan, and established the naval aviation branch, the Naval Air Arm, in 1974. whose initial pilot training takes place at the PAF Academy in Risalpur.

The Navy operates the Lockheed P-3 Orion, ATR 72 and Hawker 800 as their fixed-wing aircraft inventory. The rotary-wing aircraft in the naval air arm includes the Harbin Z-9 and the Westland Sea King. In addition, there are numbers of aircraft active in the Pakistan Maritime Security Agency (MSA).

=== Weapon systems and Air defence systems ===
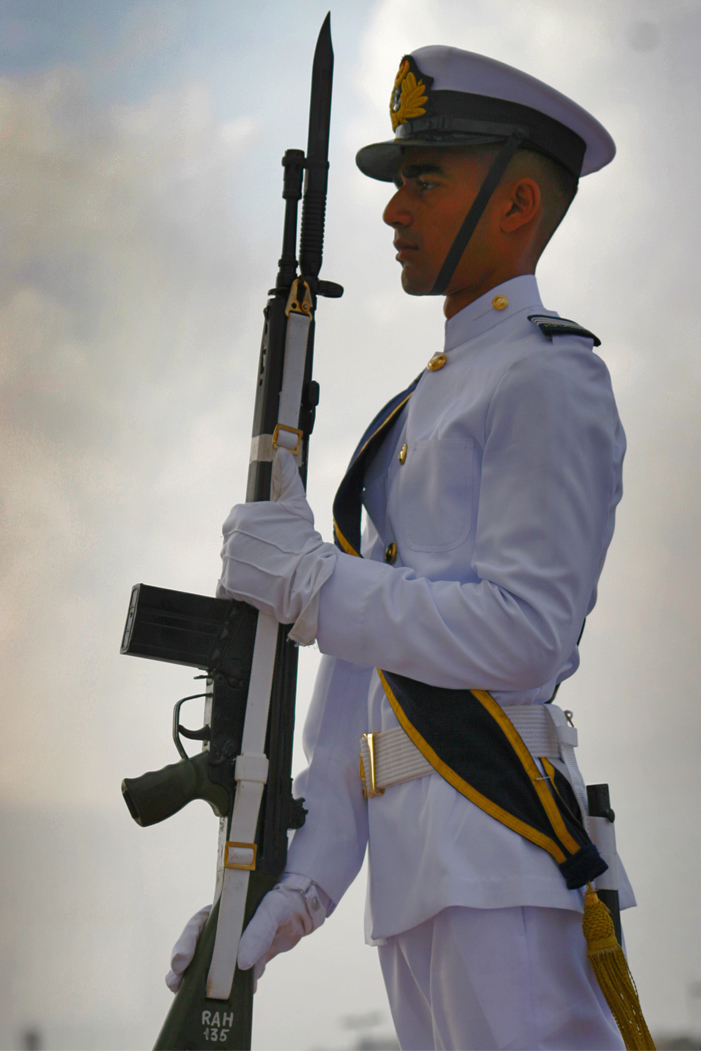
The POF G3P4 is a standard rifle issued by the Ministry of Defense as seen by the Navy's enlisted personnel in 2009.

Current weapon systems in the Pakistan Navy is entirely composed and focused towards missiles, serving as both weapons or a defence from a threat.

In 1971 with the Indian Navy's introduction of anti-ship missiles, Navy had the strong emphasis on classically using the artillery and ammunition focusing towards the vintage tactics witnessed in the previous naval wars fought in the World War II.

The Navy's primary air defence included the usage of the CAMM-ER, LY-80, FM-90, FN-16, Anza and the Mistral system.

The primary and standard rifle issued for the Navy is the POF G3P4, which is standard issue by the Ministry of Defense, and is based on the German design of the Heckler and Koch G3 rifle.

The Navy's ground based air defence is entrusted with the Pakistan Marines who received their weapons training at the School of Infantry and Tactics in Quetta with the Pakistan Army.

In 2016, the Navy inducted the Harbah cruise missile, based on the Babur design, that was test fired from the PNS Himmat– the Azmat-class missile boat. The Navy operates the Zarb cruise missile that was first test fired on 10 April 2016.

The cruise missiles system in the Navy, the Harbah and Babur–III are the variants and derivatives of the improved version of the first cruise missile that entered in the service of the Pakistan Army— the Babur cruise missile system.

- FN-16, the man-portable air-defense systems, tested on 25 December 2010 by Pakistan Marines with a range of 6 km and altitude ≈3.5 km.
- Mistral shoulder-fired surface-to-air missile, test fired on 25 December 2010 by Pakistan Marines.

The military uniform in the Pakistan Navy includes the full white-worn service uniform as seen in the footage, and is worn on regular basis by the senior ranking star officers in the Navy. In the past times of 1947–2012, the Navy's uniform had closely followed the uniforms issued in the British Royal Navy with star officers often wearing the full white dress while the junior officers to enlisted members only wearing dressed-up blue working uniforms as their authorised working uniform in the vessels.

In 2014, the Navy working uniform pattern for all officials have been changed in favour of adopting the authorised digital camouflage pattern uniform which incorporates sparse black and medium grey shapes on a light grey background.

The Navy Special Service Group follows the Army Special Service Group's authorised uniform and wears the U.S. Woodland (M81) uniform while the Pakistan Marines have their own woodland pattern featuring light brown, olive green and blue shapes on a tan or light olive background.

== Bases and facilities ==
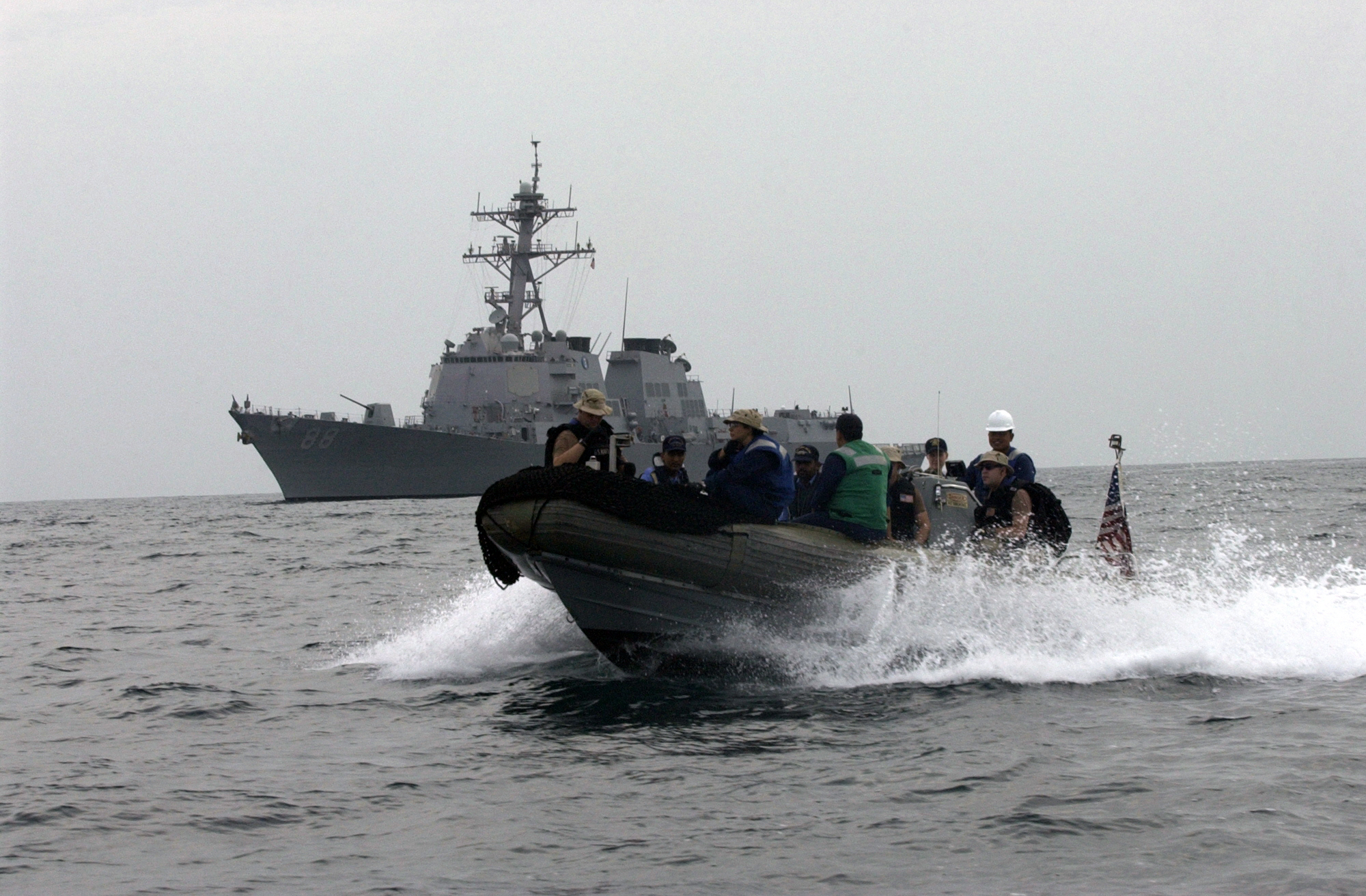
Pakistan Navy personnel conducting a naval interdiction exercise with the U.S. Navy personnel in the Indian Ocean in 2004

From 1947 to 1991, the entire naval infrastructure and bases of the Pakistan Navy were primarily based in Karachi with the exception of the Navy NHQ in Islamabad. In the 1950s, it was the crucial help from the United States Navy that the Karachi Naval Dockyard was built and constructed for wartime operations. Besides the Naval Base Karachi, the PNS Dhaka in East Pakistan was the only naval base for the Pakistan Navy, dedicated for coastal operations only

After the Indian Navy's attack on Karachi in 1971, the Navy concentrated on building and moving its operational assets in Balochistan, Punjab, and the Khyber-Pakhtunkhwa.

These naval bases are operationalised for various purposes including the logistics and maintenance support, armoury and ammunition support, air stations, military hospitals, SEALs teams, coastal and missile defences, missile boats and submarine bases, forward operating bases etc. The PNS Zafar serves as the major logistics naval base for the Pakistani military's operational capability in the western and northern Pakistan, followed by the naval forward operating base constructed at the vicinity of the Naval War College in Lahore.

The primary naval air station is PNS Mehran, followed by the establishment of the naval air stations in Makran, Ormara, Turbat and the Manora Island. In 2017, PNS Siddiq was commissioned to support the aerial missions for the Pakistan Naval Aviation reconnaissance group to guard the safety of the CPEC.

The PNS Hameed, commissioned in 2017, is a VLF facility near the Karachi coast, while the Karachi-based PNS Iqbal and the PNS Qasim serves for the operational activities dedicated for the Navy Special Service Group and the Marines. The Jinnah Naval Base and proposed Kalmat Naval Base are dedicated towards maintaining and harbouring the country's strategic assets such as the nuclear-capable submarines.

Besides deployment within Pakistan, the Pakistan Navy, along with the inter-services branches, are permanently based in different parts in the Saudi Arabia and the United Arab Emirates.

== Medical care ==
The Navy operates five hospitals:

- PNS Shifa Hospital, Karachi (885 beds)
- PNS Hafeez Hospital, Islamabad (197 beds)
- PNS Rahat Hospital, Karachi (200 beds)
- PNS Darmaan Jah Hospital, Ormara (100 beds)
- Naval Hospital, Turbat (25 beds)
- Naval Hospital, Gwadar (100 beds) is in planning

== Personnel ==
=== Officer Ranks ===
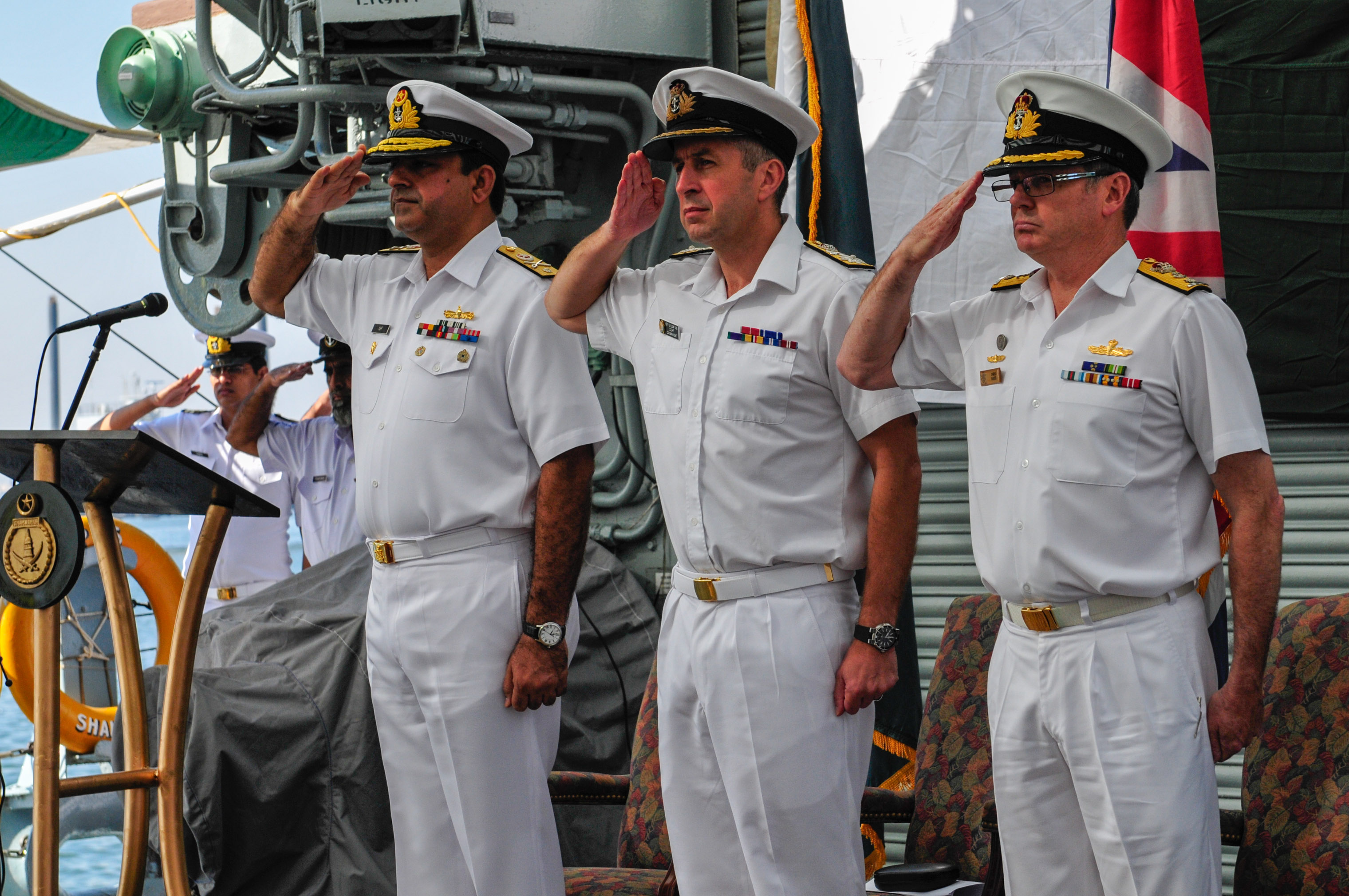
Commodore Asif Khaliq (left) saluting with officers Cdre. Keith Blount (middle) of RN Cdre. Daryl Bates (right) of RNZN. The Cdre. is a star officer rank equivalent to One star rank (Brig.) in the Pakistan Army.

From its commencement in August 1947, the Pakistan Navy had traditionally followed the ranks and insignia of the Royal Navy but disbanded in favour of adopting the officer ranks system of the United States Navy as early as the 1950s.

Unlike the army or air force where there are several paths to become the officers, there is only one way of becoming the naval officer by must attending the Pakistan Naval Academy—after passing out the boot camp in Manora Island— for one-and-half year for them to be able to passed out from the academy.

The passed out cadets gain commission in the Navy as midshipman, taking their first assignment in an open-sea ship that gives them the experience of life at sea while being trained in different careers on board. The training of the passed out midshipman usually lasts till six months before rotating back to the naval academy to be promoted as the Sub-lieutenants. Their college education is provided at the Pakistan Navy Engineering College in Karachi for three years, pursuing a bachelor's degree in their choice of career.

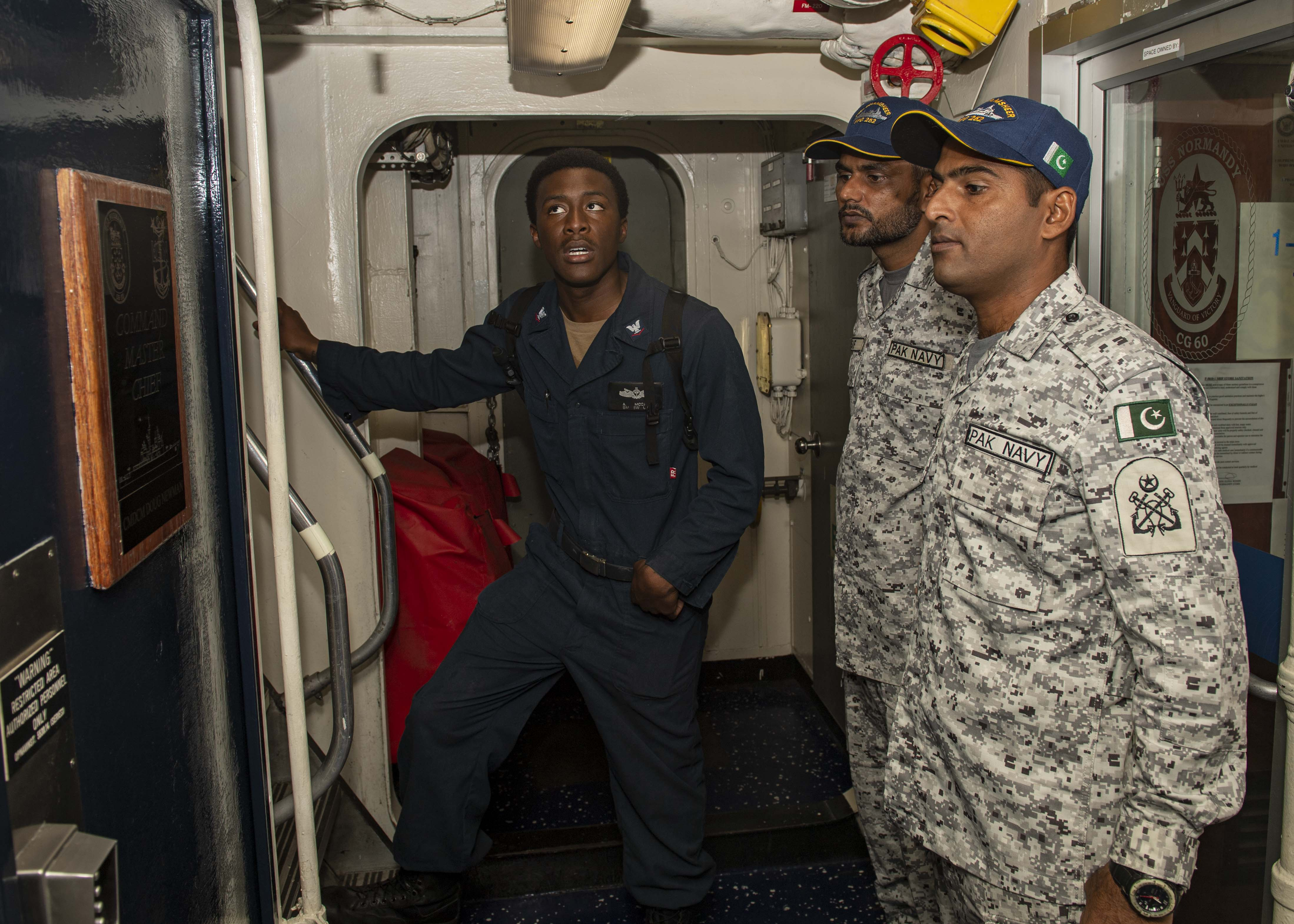
US Navy and Pakistan Navy Sailors onboard USS Normandy during a joint exercise

The Pakistan Navy has the same officer rank hierarchy as the Royal Navy; insignia are similar to the Royal Navy except that commodore's and admiral's shoulder boards have a star and crescent instead of a crown.

Besides the military officers, the Department of Navy also offers employments to civilians in financial management, accountancy, medical services, computing, and administration, and has currently employed ≈2,000 civilians that met the Navy's quota in 2018.

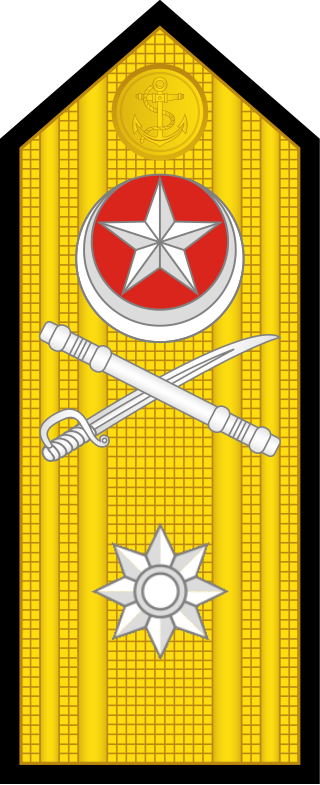
Rank group	General ranks / Senior flag officers			Star rank senior officers / Junior flag officers	Senior officers		Junior officers				Officer cadet
Pakistan Navy
Pakistan Navy	Admiral ایڈمرل	Vice admiral وائس ایڈمرل	Rear admiral بحریہ کا امیر	Commodore کموڈور	Captain کپتان	Commander کمانڈر	Lieutenant commander لیفٹیننٹ کمانڈر	Lieutenant لیفٹیننٹ	Sub-lieutenant سب لیفٹیننٹ	Midshipman مڈ شپ مین

=== Enlisted personnel ===
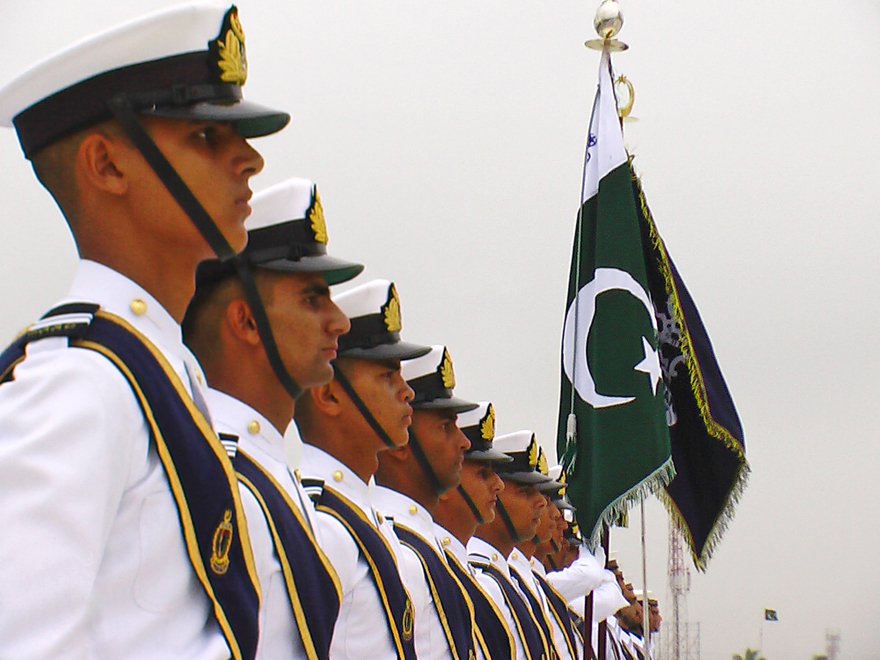
Pakistan Naval Academy cadets at the Jinnah's Tomb in Karachi in 2007

The recruitment and the enlistment in the navy is nationwide and the recruitment in the Navy is carried out by the release of the employment tender in the print newspapers and televised commercials twice a year– first group attending the boot camp in May and the second being directed on November. The Directorate of Recruitment that is located in the Navy NHQ in Islamabad controls the recruiting offices and centers in all over the country— the recruiting offices are located in Punjab, Khyber-Pakhtunkhwa, Sindh, and Balochistan. Before 1966, almost all the enlisted personnel and officers had to be sent to attend the military academies in the United Kingdom to be educated and to be trained in technical branches for the Pakistan Navy.

After passing out from the nine-month long boot camp, the enlisted personnel are directed for subsequent job training at the PNS Karsaz in Karachi on the matters of technical subjects and assigned for different branches in the Navy.

Promotion in the Navy from the enlistment to officers ranks are much quicker than the army or the air force, as the Department of Navy offers financial aid to those enlisted personnel successful in their profession to attend the colleges and universities. Most of the enlisted personnel rarely stays in their enlisted ranks at the time of their retirement as most retires at junior officer ranks once reaching their retirement age of 62

Their technical experiences in their fields is consolidated into the professional training that forms their basis to attend the respective university for them to earn the four-year college degree.

The noncommissioned officers (or enlists) wear respective anchors colour patches or badges chevrons on their shoulders. Retirement age for the enlisted personnel varies and depends on the enlisted ranks that they have attained during their services.

Rank group	Senior NCOs				Junior NCOs	Enlisted
Pakistan Navy							No insignia
Pakistan Navy	Master chief petty officer ماسٹر چیف پیٹی آفیسر	Fleet chief petty officer فلیٹ چیف پیٹی آفیسر	Chief petty officer چیف پیٹی آفیسر	Petty officer چھوٹا افسر	Leading seaman معروف سی مین	Able seaman قابل ملاح	Ordinary seaman عام سی مین

=== Recruitment and training ===
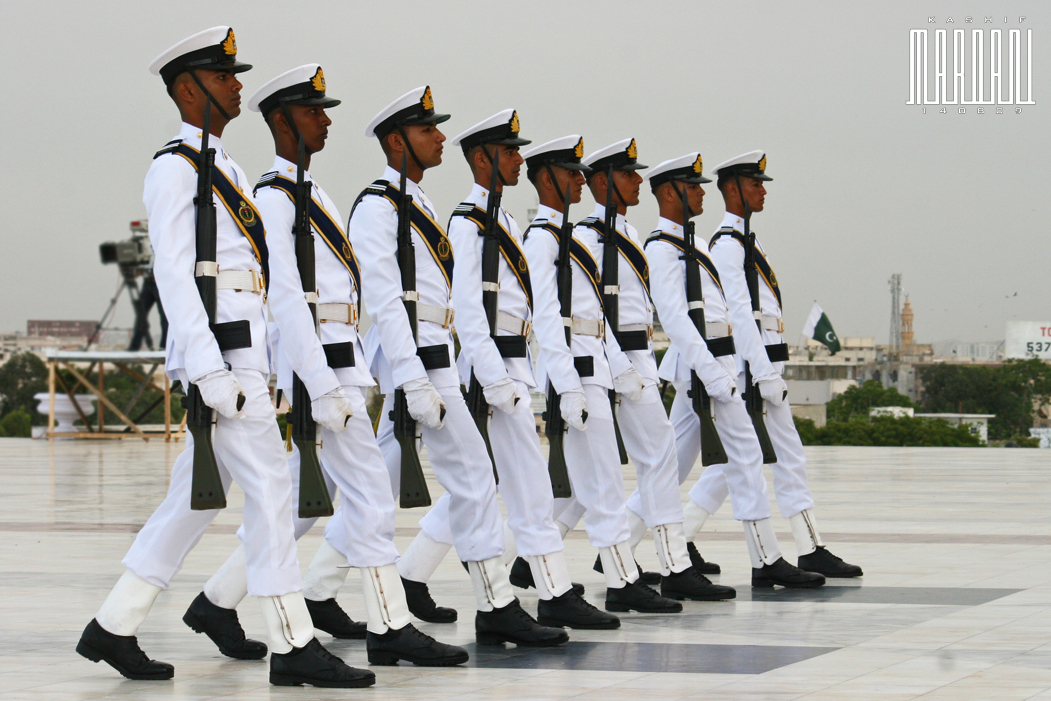
The passing out (graduation) of cadets from the Pakistan Naval Academy in Karachi in 2008. The education and boot camp training last for two years before cadets becomes sailors.

After the Navy was established in August 1947, the Navy had to send its officers and enlisted personnel to be trained at the Britannia Royal Naval College in the United Kingdom whose training and education by the British Royal Navy was crucial at all levels of cadet's learning and schooling. During its earliest time in 1947, the Department of Navy had only 3,800 personnel (200 officers, 3,000 Enlists, and 500 civilian employees) as the Navy faced the same problems as its Department of Army as the most technical enlisted personnel and skilled executive officers were Punjabi Muslims while others had Urdu-speaking background (i.e. Indian immigrants as naturalised citizens of Pakistan).

After 1971, the Bhutto administration introduced the quota system to give fair chance to the residents of Khyber Pakhtunkhwa and Balochistan to enlist in the military. In 2012, Sanhia Karim became the first Balochi woman to be commissioned into the navy, she joined in a squad consisting of fifty-three female officers and seventy-two enlists from Balochistan. In 2012, the Navy pushed its personnel strength to Balochistan after sending a large formation of Baloch university students to Navy Engineering Colleges and War College as well as staff schools to complete their officer training requirements. The Navy established three additional facilities in Balochistan to supervise the training to its personnel.

Recruitment in the Navy remains to be challenge for the naval recruiters to enlists citizens and their selfless commitment to the military from the urbanised metropolitan cities where the preference of college education (especially attending post-graduate schooling in the United States and the English-speaking countries) is much higher and strongly desirable. Furthermore, the medical standards and education levels required by the Department of Navy to be able to perform technical jobs also poses significant challenges as the Navy requiring the significant percentage marks once the matriculation examinations are concluded.

The Navy has only one boot camp, the PNS Himalaya in Manora Island, where the basic military training takes place. The basic military training at the PNS Himalaya goes for nine-months where instructions on military life is given while the physical conditioning is strongly emphasised. The officer cadets are sent to attend the Pakistan Naval Academy where their training lasts for two years before they are able to pass out from the Naval Academy. Once passing out, the commissioned junior officers must spend six-month deployment in Arabian Sea before being selected to attend the professional schools, such as the Naval Engineering College in Karachi, to move towards attaining the bachelor's degree in a period of four-years.

As the estimates made in 2003 and 2009, the Navy had approximately ≈30,200 active duty personnel. In 2014, the estimates established the Navy's manpower strength at 30,700 active duty personnel. but its combined manpower strength is increased and approximated at ≈40,500 personnel based on recent estimates in 2018.

== Education and training ==
=== Schooling, teaching, and institutions ===
The Pakistan Navy offers the wide range of lucrative careers to the high school graduates in the technical fields by issuing specialised diplomas and certifications at the PNS Karsaz and the PNS Bahadur, which consists of the schools of operations, underwater, surface weapons, communications, and the naval police. Instructions and technical education on technical fields and the engineering are primarily taught at the Pakistan Navy Engineering College that is open for both military and public admission, and offers college degree programs at undergraduate and post-graduate level.

When the Navy was established in 1947, there was no technical schools for the Navy to look after the ship maintenance and power machinery that led to the establishment of the Pakistan Naval Polytechnic Institute (PNPI) in 1951 and the Navy Engineering College in 1962 whose admissions are open to public besides the military personnel. From 1947 to 1967, the Navy had to rely on the education and training provided by the Royal Navy at all levels of schooling, and had to send most of its officers and enlisted men to be trained at the Britannia Royal Naval College at the Dartmouth and the Royal Naval College in Greenwich who were mostly trained in communication and navigation. Training on the operations of warships and education on the military staffing was crucial for the Pakistan Navy in the 1960s under the United States-sponsored International Military Education and Training (IMET) arranged for Pakistan under the Security Assistance Program (SAP) as the U.S. Navy's officers served in the faculty of the engineering and technical schools of the Navy.

In 1966, the Pakistan Naval Academy was established under the guidance of the United States Navy, and is a premier institution of higher learning whose alumni included the Commanders of the Royal Qatari Navy, Royal Saudi Navy, and the Sri Lanka Navy while other nations naval cadets have also attended the naval academy.

In 1968, the Pakistan Naval War College was established in Lahore, whose curriculum is very similar to the Naval War College in the United States, is a primary military staff college which offers critical thinking techniques and developing ideas for naval warfare to the officers in the army and the air force. In 1970, the School of Logistics and Management was established that conducts research on military logistics and management in imparting naval warfare techniques to the military officers serving in the army, air force, and marines departments of the Pakistani military.

After the 1971 war with India, the Navy established several schools on strategy, naval warfare, and weapons tactics by commissioning the PNS Bahadur in 1981 as the navy established schools are listed below:

Navy schools and colleges	Year of establishment	School and college principal locations	Website
Naval Polytechnic Institute	1951	Karachi in Sindh	"Naval Polytechnic Institute".
PNS Karsaz	1954	Karachi in Sindh	"PNS Karsaz".
Navy Engineering College	1962	Karachi in Sindh	"Pakistan Navy Engineering College".
Submarine School	1964	Karachi in Sindh	"Submarine School".
PNS Iqbal	1967	Karachi in Sindh	"PNS Iqbal—Naval Special Warfare School". Archived from the original on 3 January 2019.
Naval War College	1968	Lahore in Punjab	"Naval War College". Archived from the original on 12 June 2018.
School of Logistics and Management	1970	Karachi in Sindh	"School of Logistics and Management".
School of Aviation	1975	Karachi in Sindh	"School of Aviation".
PNS Bahadur	1980	Karachi in Sindh	"PNS Bahadur".
PNS Rahnuma	1982	Karachi in Sindh	-
Navigation and Operations School	1981	Karachi in Sindh	"Navigation and Operations School".
Surface Weapons School	1981	Karachi in Sindh	"Surface Weapons School".
Underwater Warfare School	1981	Karachi in Sindh	"Underwater Warfare School".
Communications School	1981	Karachi in Sindh	"Communications School".
Navy Hydrography School	1984	Karachi in Sindh	"Hydrography School".
Navy School of Music	1993	Karachi in Sindh	"School of Music".
Naval Police School	1997	Karachi in Sindh	"Regulating and Provost School".
Information Warfare School	2002	Karachi in Sindh	"Information Warfare School".
Naval Special Operation Training Center	2015	Nathia Gali in Khyber-Pakhtunkhwa	"Naval STOC". Facebook. Archived from the original on 26 February 2022.
Public schooling and universities	Year of establishment	School and college principal locations	Website
Pakistan Navy School	1999	Karachi in Sindh
Bahria University	2000	Islamabad in Pakistan	"Bahria University". Archived from the original on 27 April 2012.
Bahria College, Nore 1 Karachi	1986	Karachi in Sindh	"Bahria College Karachi".
Bahria College, Naval Complex Islamabad	1986	Islamabad in Pakistan
Bahria College, Karsaz Karachi	1986	Karachi in Sindh	"Bahria College, Karsaz". Archived from the original on 4 February 2019.
Cadet College Petaro	1957	Jamshoro in Sindh	"Petaro".
Cadet College Ormara	1987	Ormara in Balochistan	"Cadet College Ormara".
Higher education institutions	Year of establishment	locations	Website
National Defense University	1971	Islamabad	"National Defense University". Archived from the original on 21 January 2019.
National University of Sciences and Technology	1991	Multiple campuses	"National University of Sciences and Technology". Archived from the original on 23 October 2020.

Source: Pakistan Navy (Official Website)

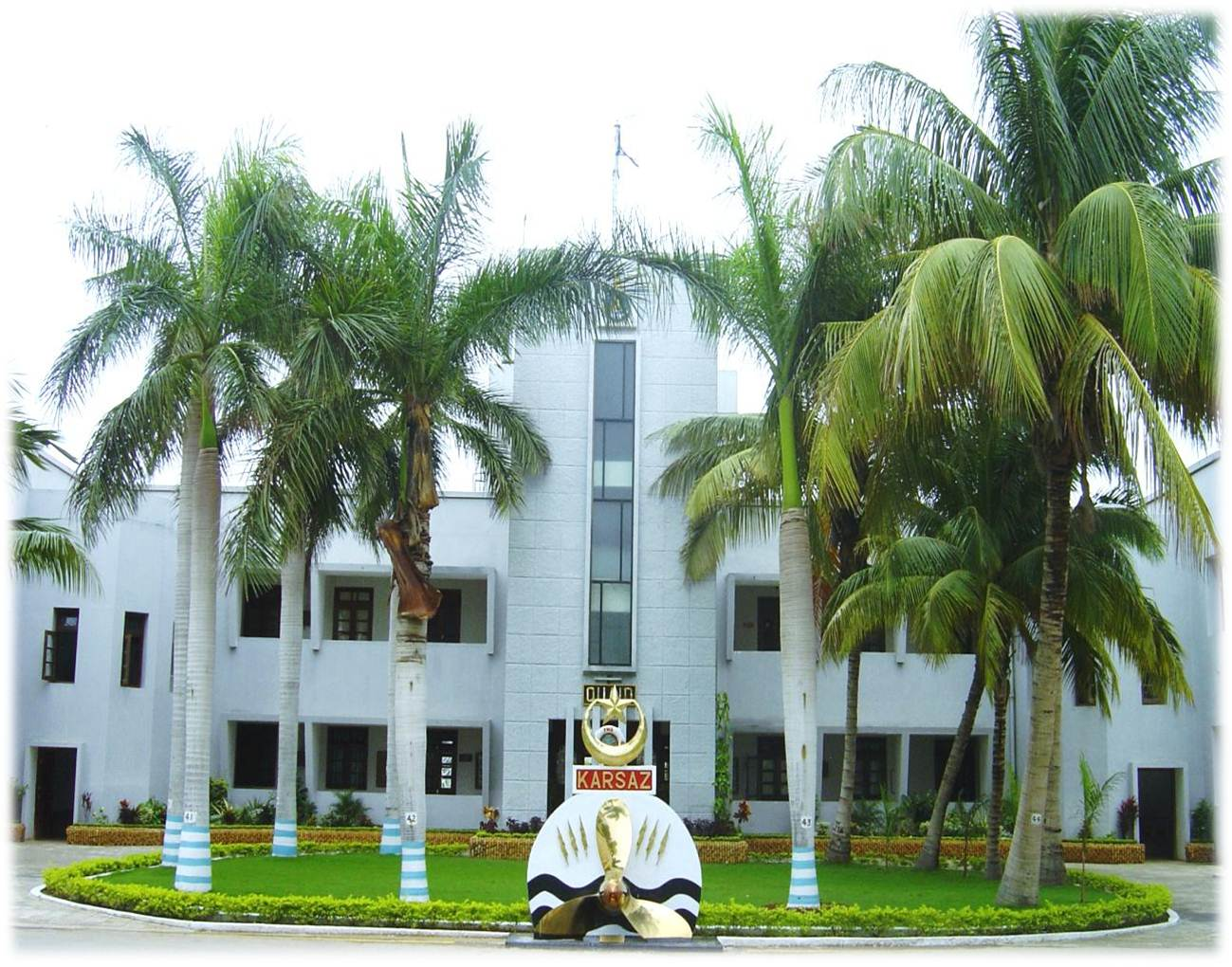
The PNS Karsaz—the training facility on heavy machinery was established in 1954.

Established in 1971, the National Defense University (NDU) in Islamabad is the most senior and premier institute of higher learning that provides the advance critical thinking level and research-based strategy level education to the senior military officers in the Pakistani military. The NDU is a significant institution of higher learning in understanding the institutional norms of military tutelage in Pakistan because it constitutes the "highest learning platform where the military leadership comes together for common instruction", according to thesis written by Pakistani author Aqil Shah. Without securing their graduation from their master's program at the NDU, no officer in the Pakistani military can be promoted as general in the army or air force, or admiral in the navy or marines as it is a prerequisite for their promotion to become a senior member at the Joint Chiefs of Staff Committee.

Additionally, the platform provided at the NDU represents a radical shift from the emphasis on operational and staff functions and the level of ranks are imposed as qualification to attend the master's program at the NDU, usually brigadiers, air commodores, and commodores, are invited to given admission in broad range of strategic, political, social, and economic factors as these factors affect the country's national security. In this sense, the NDU becomes the critical thinking institution as its constitutes active-duty senior military officers corps' baptism into a shared ideological framework about the military's appropriate role, status, and behaviour in relation to state and society, and shared values affect how these officers perceive and respond to civilian governmental decisions, policies, and political crises. Admission to the NDU is not restricted to military officials, but civilians can also attend and graduate, allowing them to explore the broader aspects of national security.

Established in 1991, the National University of Sciences and Technology (NUST) has now absorbed and amalgamated the existing naval engineering college, and is a counterpart institution in science and technology to that of the NDU in Islamabad. Besides the strategic and military education, the Navy leads some marine scientific programs via the Naval Observatory while it leads the research on hydrography by conducting the hydrographic survey through the PNS Behr Paima, and provides support to the oceanographic program led by the civilian National Institute of Oceanography (NIO).

== Naval jack ==
Naval jack of the Pakistan Navy

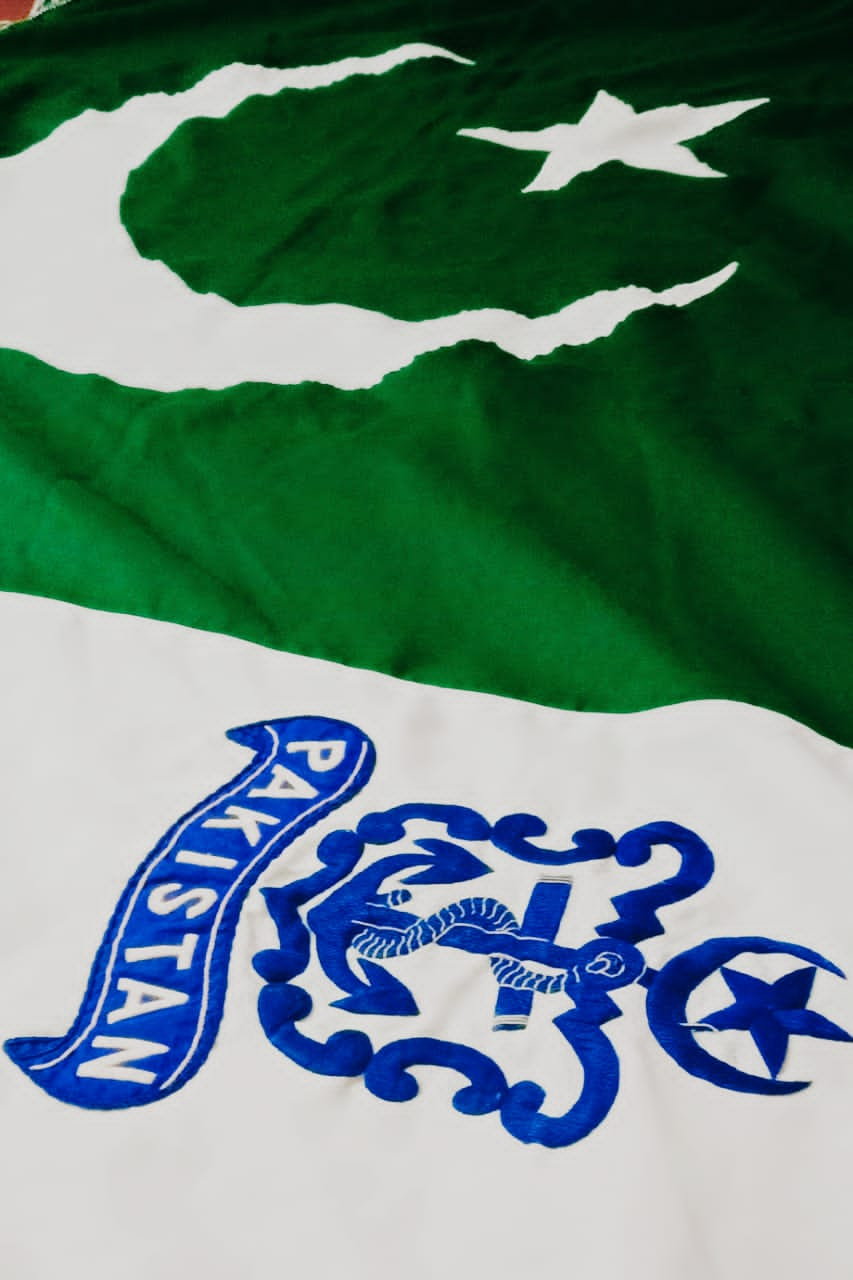
Naval Flag of Pakistan Navy

From 1947 to 1956, the Pakistan Navy had stuck with the Ensign of the Royal Indian Navy that featured the British Queen's colours and the white flag. The Navy continued the tradition that it inherited from the Royal Indian Navy and British culture that was common with the Royal Navy until the American military advisers was attached the guide the Navy on military arts and science under the Military Advisory Assistance Group by the Eisenhower administration in 1956.

Since then, the Navy's tradition and culture is commonly and uniquely influenced from the United States Navy.

After the promulgation of the Constitution in 1956, the Navy gained its independence from the British Royal patronage and became the federal institution of the armed forces commissioned by the elected President of Pakistan. The prefix Royal was permanently removed from the Navy as well as disbanding the British monarch culture and tradition in the Navy.

The naval jack and the ensign flag of the Navy immediately replaced the Queen's colours and the white ensign entirely, instead the dark blue colour with the anchor crest of the Navy was adopted while the blue anchor was added in the side of the corner white coloured section on the national flag of Pakistan. Since then, the naval jack has always flown in the warships of the Pakistan Navy while the naval ensign of the Navy is commonly used by the Pakistan Marines as their primary war flag.

== Civil society and business activities ==
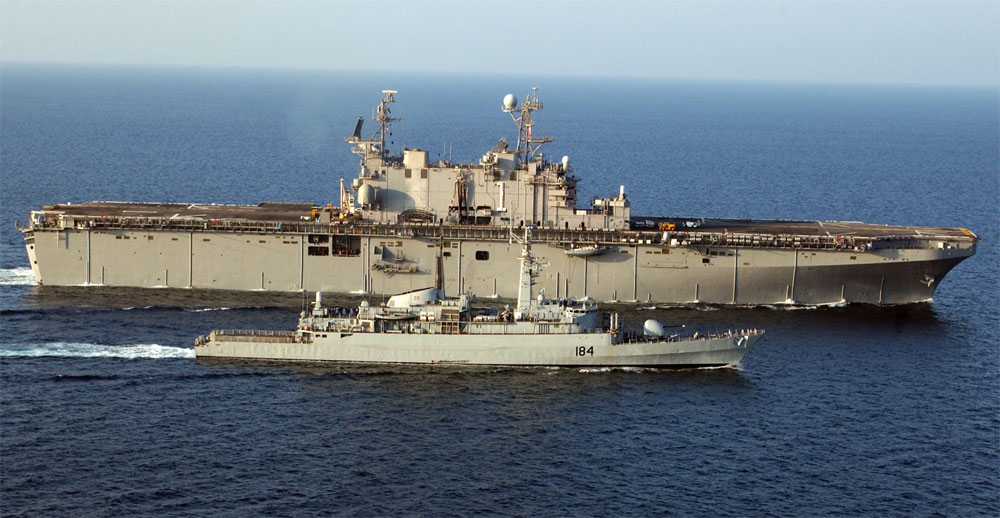
PNS Badr participating in the relief operations after the earthquake hit the northern parts of the country in 2005

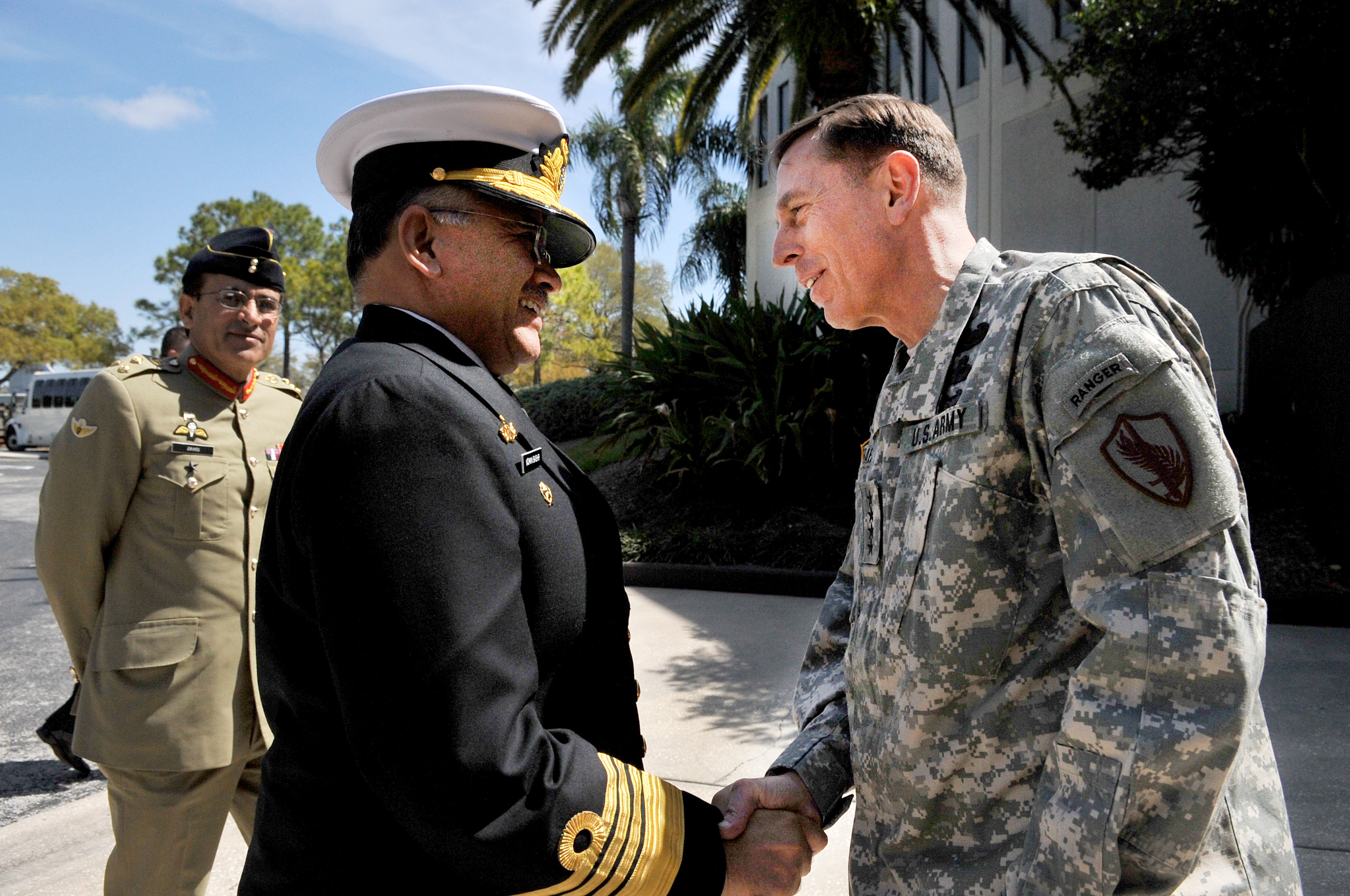
Adm. Bashir meeting with the U.S. Army General David Petraeus, top commander of ISAF in Afghanistan, to initiate peace initiatives and counter-terrorism operations against Taliban forces in Afghanistan in 2010.

The Pakistan Navy has played an integral part in the civil society of Pakistan, almost since its inception. In 1996, General Jehangir Karamat described Pakistan armed forces' relations with the society:

In my opinion, if we have to repeat of past events then we must understand that Military leaders can pressure only up to a point. Beyond that their own position starts getting undermined because the military is after all is a mirror image of the civil society from which it is drawn.

— General Jehangir Karamat on civil society–military relations

In times of national calamities and emergencies, the Pakistan Navy has been deployed in relief operations and nation building programs in the country. In 2004, a tactical task force under then-Commodore Asif Sandila coordinated the peacetime relief operations in Maldives, Sri Lanka, Indonesia, and Bangladesh when the underwater earthquake caused a tsunami and struck the South Asian nations. In 2005, the Navy deployed the PNS Badr (D-184) to help assists the relief efforts for the earthquake that struck the northern part of the country in October 2005.

In 2010, the Navy coordinated one of its largest relief operations during the nationwide flash floods, with Navy divers rescuing and evacuating more than 352,291 people in August 2010. In addition, the Navy and Marines personnel provided 43,850 kg of food and relief goods to flood victims; 5,700 kg of ready-to-cook food, 1,000 kg of dates and 5,000 kg of food has been dispatched to Sukkur.As of January 2011, under the program PN Model Village, the Navy's civil engineering corps built the model houses in the affected areas for the internally displaced person (IDPs).

On 10 June 2018, Pakistan Navy and Maritime Security Agency rescued eleven Iranian crew members on a sunken Iranian boat in the Northern Arabian Sea, about 230 kilometres (140 mi) away from Karachi.

=== Corporate and business activities ===
The Pakistan Navy has the wider commercial and financial interests in the country, and is a forerunner of the Bahria Foundation (lit. 'Naval Foundation'). From 1996 to 2000, the Navy was a major sponsor of the Bahria Town– the real estate enterprise – and reportedly received market shares for the use of its name in commercial building projects. In 2002, the Navy filed a civil lawsuit to refrain the Bahria Town using its name for profiteering – the lawsuit was eventually settled in civil court in favour of Navy in 2018.

For external billets appointment, the federal government takes the senior leadership of the Navy as secondment to manage the federal institutions such as the Port of Karachi and the Gwadar Port.

== Awards and honours ==
=== Nishan-e-Haider ===
In military awards hierarchy, the Nishan-e-Haider (lit. 'Order of Lion Urdu نشان حیدر abbreviated as NH') is the highest and the most prestigious honour awarded posthumously for bravery and actions of valor in event of war. Established in March 1956 by the Constitution, this award is an equivalent to the American Medal of Honor, British Victoria Cross (VC), Russian Order of St. Andrew, or the French Legion of Honour. Unlike the American Medal of Honor, the Nishan-e-Haider (NH) has only been conferred to those who have been "martyred" and proved their distinguished valor of actions in an event of conflict or war.

Since the commencement of the Navy on 15 August 1947, no naval officer has been honoured or bestowed with the medal. After the PNS Mehran attack on 22 May 2011, a recommendation was sent by the Prime Minister of Pakistan to the President of Pakistan to posthumously honour Lt. Syed Yasir Abbas for his heroic actions during the attack but the recommendations were rejected by the President of Pakistan.

== See also ==
- Pakistan Maritime Security Agency
- Pakistan Coast Guards
- Pakistan Marines
- Pakistan Naval Academy
- Pakistan Naval Air Arm
- Special Service Group (Navy)
