= List of Pakistan Navy bases =

This is a list of all naval bases, facilities, hospitals, and other installations of the Pakistan Navy (PN). The Pakistan Navy operates multiples naval bases and facilities throughout Pakistan, primarily in the coastal provinces of Sindh and Balochistan.

Name	Logo	Established	Type	Location	Notes
Jinnah Naval Base		22 June 2000	Strategic naval base	Ormara, Balochistan	This is the second-largest naval base in Pakistan.
Naval Headquarters (NHQ)			Headquarters of the Pakistan Navy	Islamabad	
PNS Ahsan		30 October 1991	Naval air station	Gwadar, Balochistan	
PNS Akram		1983	Surveillance station	Gwadar, Balochistan	
PNS Bahadur		1983	Training establishment	Karachi, Sindh	
PNS Darmaan Jah		September 2011	Military hospital	Ormara, Balochistan	
PNS Hafeez		March 1974	Military hospital	Islamabad	
PNS Hameed		15 November 2016	VLF radio transmission facility	Karachi, Sindh	
PNS Himalaya		27 November 1943	Training establishment	Karachi, Sindh	
PNS Iqbal		1966	Headquarters of Special Service Group (Navy)	Karachi, Sindh	
PNS Jauhar		1982	Military engineering college	Karachi, Sindh	
PNS Karsaz			Training establishment	Karachi, Sindh	
PNS Makran		23 October 1988	Naval air station	Pasni, Balochistan	
PNS Mehran		1975	Naval air station	Karachi, Sindh	
PNS Qasim		1990	Pakistan Marines training establishment	Karachi, Sindh	
PNS Rahat		1954	Military hospital	Karachi, Sindh	
PNS Rahbar, Pakistan Naval Academy (PNA)		1970	Military academy	Karachi, Sindh	
PNS Shifa		1953	Military hospital and medical college	Karachi, Sindh	
PNS Siddique		25 May 2017	Naval air station	Turbat, Balochistan	
PNS Zafar		1974	Headquarters of Northern Command	Islamabad	
Karachi Shipyard & Engineering Works (KSEW)		1957	Major shipbuilding corporation	Karachi, Sindh	
PN Dockyard			Primary naval base	Karachi, Sindh	
Naval Research and Development Institute			Dedicated naval R&D facility	Karachi, Sindh	
