= 29 Squadron PN =

29 Anti-Submarine Warfare Squadron
- ۲۹ سکواڈرن
- Active: Since 1976 (50 years, 9 months)
- Country: Pakistan
- Allegiance: Pakistan Navy
- Branch: Pakistan Naval Air Arm
- Type: Squadron
- Role: ASW; Maritime patrol Transport
- Station: PNS Mehran
- Nickname: Sea Eagles
- Mottos: Resources are limited, Creativity is unlimited
- Anniversaries: 8 September (Navy day)
- Engagements: Kargil war; Atlantique Incident

Aircraft flown
- Patrol: "RAS-72 Sea Eagle". Bréguet 1150 Atlantic
- Transport: ATR 72-500; Hawker 850XP

The 29 ASW Squadron also called Sea Eagles is an anti-submarine squadron of the Pakistan Navy stationed at PNS Mehran and operates RAS-72 MPA, ATR-72-500 transporters and Hawker 850XP executive jets.

== History ==
In the setbacks which occurred during the 1971 Indo-Pakistani war, the Ministry of Defense realized the lack and importance of naval patrol aircraft. Evaluations for a suitable MPA platform were started and the French Bréguet 1150 Atlantic was selected in 1974. In 1976, three MPAs were acquired and operationalized. In line of the 29th year of independence of Pakistan, the unit was named as 29 ASW Squadron.

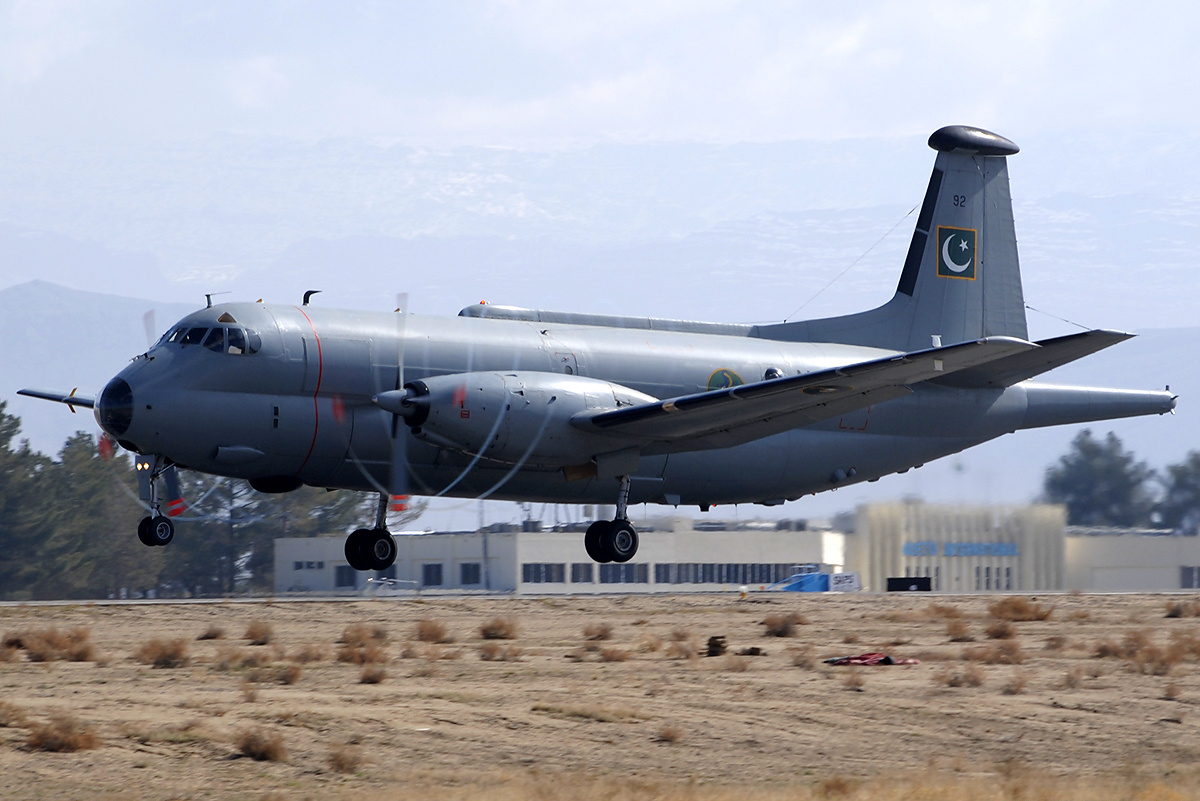
Breguet 1150 Atlantic of the 29 ASW Squadron taking off from PAF Base Samungli.

The squadron became the first Atlantic operator to modify the type to fire Exocet Anti-ship missiles, it conducted the first live firing on 27th February 1985. The mid-1990s saw the squadron's fleet being refurbished with improved French sensors and sub-systems like ESM, Acoustic Processor, Radar, improved Navigation System etc.

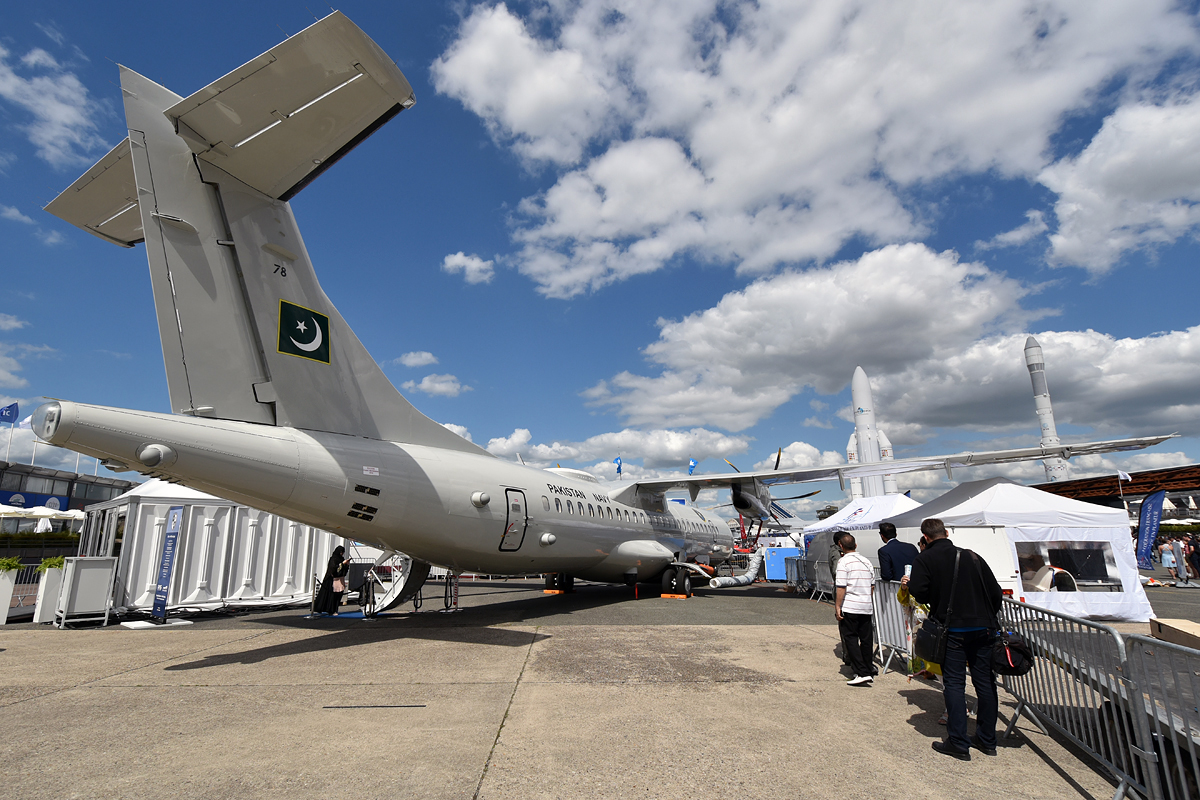
Pakistan Navy's new RAS-72 Sea Eagle

=== Operational history ===
The squadron remained active throughout the Kargil war performing patrolling missions along the India-Pakistan border. On one such occasion, an Attaltic was patrolling over the disputed Sir Creek when it was intercepted and subsequently shot down by an Indian Mig-21. This incident became what is now known as the Atlantique incident.

=== Exercises ===
- Exercise Mavi Balina - Regular participant

== See also ==
- 28 Squadron PN
