= PNS Siddique =

Pakistan Navy air station and airport

PNS Siddiq
- پی این ایس صدیق
- Part of Turbat International Airport
- Kech District, Balochistan Province; Near Turbat in Pakistan

Site information
- Type: Naval Air Station
- Owner: Ministry of Defense
- Operator: Pakistan Armed Forces
- Controlled by: Pakistan Navy
- Condition: Operational
- Website: Pakistan Navy

Location
- Coordinates: 25°17′28″N 63°20′41″E

Site history
- Built: 2014
- Built for: Naval Air Arm
- Built by: Pakistan
- In use: 2014-Present
- Battles/wars: Afghanistan–Pakistan clashes (2024–present); 2024 PNS Siddiq attack

Garrison information
- Occupants: 28 Squadron PN

Airfield information
- Identifiers: IATA: none, ICAO: none
- Elevation: 122 metres (400 ft) AMSL
Runways
Direction	Length and surface
08L/26R	1,829 metres (6,001 ft) Bitumen
08R/26L	2,743 metres (8,999 ft) Bitumen

Pakistan Naval Station Siddique, known as PNS Siddique (Urdu: پایگاه بحریہ مکران) formerly known as Naval Air Station, Turbat, is a naval air station and a military airport located in Turbat city of Makran, Balochistan. It is one of four active Naval Air Arm bases (others are PNS Mehran, PNS Makran, Naval Air Station Ormara) and currently the second largest naval air station after PNS Mehran.

== History ==
Turbat, a small town with a population of less than 200,000, boasts an international airport (IATA code: TUK) offering flights to Muscat, Sharjah, Karachi, Gwadar, and Dalbandian. Situated approximately 90 km NNW of Pasni and 117 km NE of Gwadar, Turbat enjoys road connections to Panjgur, Kalat, Pasni, and Karachi, but lacks rail infrastructure. On 3 September 2014, Pakistan's Naval Chief Admiral Mohammad Asif Sandila commissioned PNS Siddique, a new naval air base in Turbat, southern Balochistan. This marked a further step in the Pakistan Navy's (PN) strategic relocation of assets away from the congested city of Karachi, a process that commenced following the Indian Navy's attack and containment of PN units in Karachi during the 1971 war.

== Current operations ==
PNS Siddiq boasts a modern runway capable of accommodating large aircraft, enabling the Pakistan Navy (PN) to operate maritime patrol aircraft (MPAs) like the Lockheed Martin P-3C Orion from this strategically located base in Turbat. This move signifies a shift in PN's operational strategy, diversifying its assets beyond the previously heavily reliant PNS Mehran, which suffered an insurgent attack in 2011, resulting in the loss of two P-3C Orion MPAs.

== See also ==
- Pakistan Naval Air Arm
- PNS Makran
- PNS Mehran
