= List of aircraft of the Pakistan Naval Air Arm =

Below is a list of aircraft that are or were in service with the Pakistan Naval Air Arm. The list includes both active and retired aircraft.

== Active ==
Fixed-wing aircraft (17)
Aircraft	Image	Origin	Role	Versions	Quantity	Notes
Embraer Lineage 1000		Brazil	MPA	Sea Sultan LRMPA	3 delivered, 7 on order	Deliveries will start in 2026. Two being modified for Maritime patrol by Leonardo and Paramount Group while one temporarily transferred to PAF VVIP squadron.
Lockheed P-3 Orion		United States	MPA	P-3B AEW (Upgraded) P-3C MPA (Update II.5 CUP)	6	1 P-3C crashed on the 29th October 1999 in the coast of Pasni. 2 P-3C lost in PNS Mehran attack which were later replaced. Operated by the 28 Squadron PN.
ATR-72		France/Italy	MPA	RAS-72 Sea Eagle (72-500)	5	
Hawker 800		United Kingdom	VIP	850XP	4	
Rotorcraft (38)
Westland Sea King		United Kingdom	Multi-purpose military helicopter	Mk.45/Mk.45A/C, HAR.3A, HC.4 & Commando Mk.3	25	The first helicopters operated by the Pakistan Navy (specifically the Mk.45 variant), delivered and inducted on May 28, 1974. Operated by the 111 Squadron PN.
Harbin Z-9		China	Utility helicopter	Z-9EC; Z-9D	6 + more planned	Operated by the 222 Squadron PN.
Aérospatiale Alouette III		France	Light utility helicopter	SA316B SA319B	7	Operated by the 333 Squadron PN.
Eurocopter Fennec		France	Light utility helicopter	H125M	20+ planned	
Unmanned Aerial System
GIDS Uqab		Pakistan	ISTAR	Uqab II	Unknown	Operated by the 47 UAV Squadron.
CH-4 Rainbow		China	UCAV, ISTAR	CH-4	Unknown	Operated by the 47 UAV Squadron.
Schiebel Camcopter S-100		Austria	ISTAR	N/A	Unknown	
EMT Luna		Germany	ISTAR	Luna NG	Unknown	
MQ-27 Scan Eagle		United States	ISTAR	N/A	Unknown	

== Retired ==
Fixed-wing aircraft
Aircraft	Image	Origin	Role	Quantity	Service	Notes
Bréguet 1150 Atlantic		France	MPA	3	1973-2012	One was shot down in the 1999 Pakistani Breguet 1150 Atlantic shootdown
Fokker F27 Friendship		Netherlands	MPA	7	1982-2020	Initially used during the 1971 Indo-Pak war as an urgent maritime reconnaissance aircraft. All aircraft were leased from PIA, and were then purchased and put into service in 1982 with the formation of the 27th ASW Squadron.
Rotorcraft
Westland Lynx HAS.3		United Kingdom	Multi-purpose military helicopter	3	1994-2008	Retired and currently put on sale with one put on display at Pakistan Maritime Museum.
Mil Mi-14		Soviet Union	Anti-submarine helicopter	2-4	Unknown	The Pakistan Navy operated Mi-14PG, an anti-submarine warfare (ASW) variant of the Mi-8, which could land on water.

== See also ==
- List of aircraft of the Pakistan Air Force
