= Noman Bashir =

Pakistani admiral

Admiral Noman Bashir NI(M) HI(M) SI(M) TI(M)
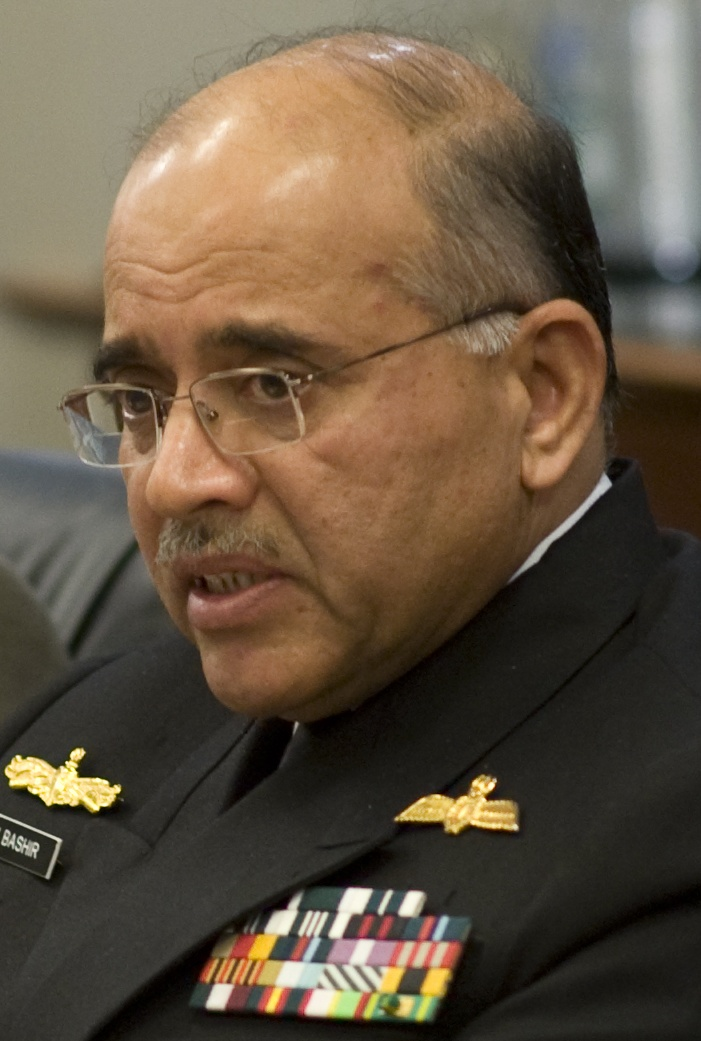
- Adm. Noman Bashir in 2010

Chief of Naval Staff
- In office 7 October 2008 – 7 October 2011
- Preceded by: Adm. Afzal Tahir
- Succeeded by: Adm. Asif Sandila

Personal details
- Born: Noman Bashir Pakistan
- Citizenship: Pakistan
- Relatives: Salman Bashir (brother)

Military service
- Allegiance: Pakistan
- Branch/service: Pakistan Navy
- Years of service: 1971–2011
- Rank: Admiral (PN No. 1471)
- Unit: Naval Aviation
- Commands: Commander Pakistan Fleet; Commander Karachi Coast; DCNS (Projects-II) at Navy NHQ; Commander Naval Aviation; GM (Operations) at KPT; DG Naval Intelligence; Pakistan Command–Middle East; ACNS (Training) at Navy NHQ; Jinnah Naval Base
- Battles/wars: Indo-Pakistani War of 1971; Third Afghan Civil War; Atlantique incident; 2001 Indo-Pakistani Standoff; 2008 Indo-Pakistani Standoff; War on terror; War in Afghanistan; OEF–Horn of Africa; War in North-West Pakistan; Operation Umeed-e-Nuh; PNS Mehran Operation; Operation Madad
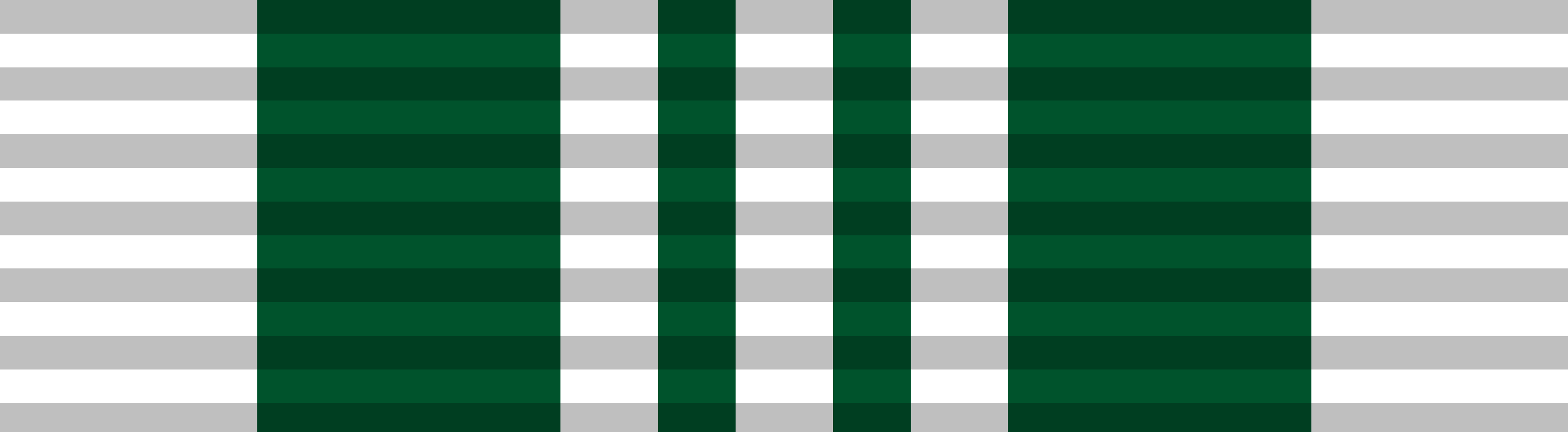
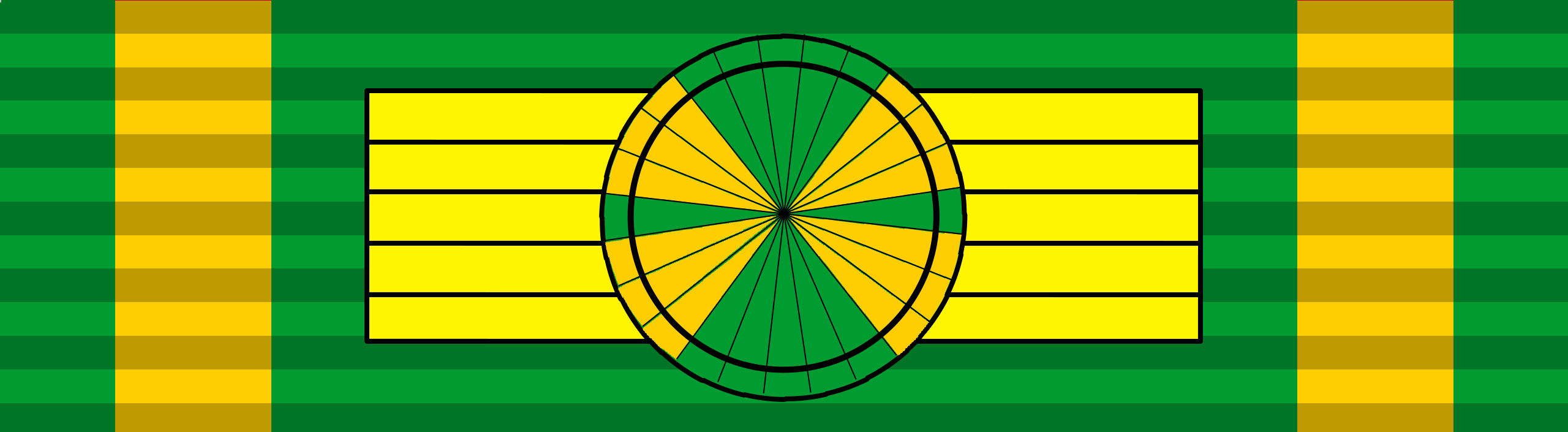
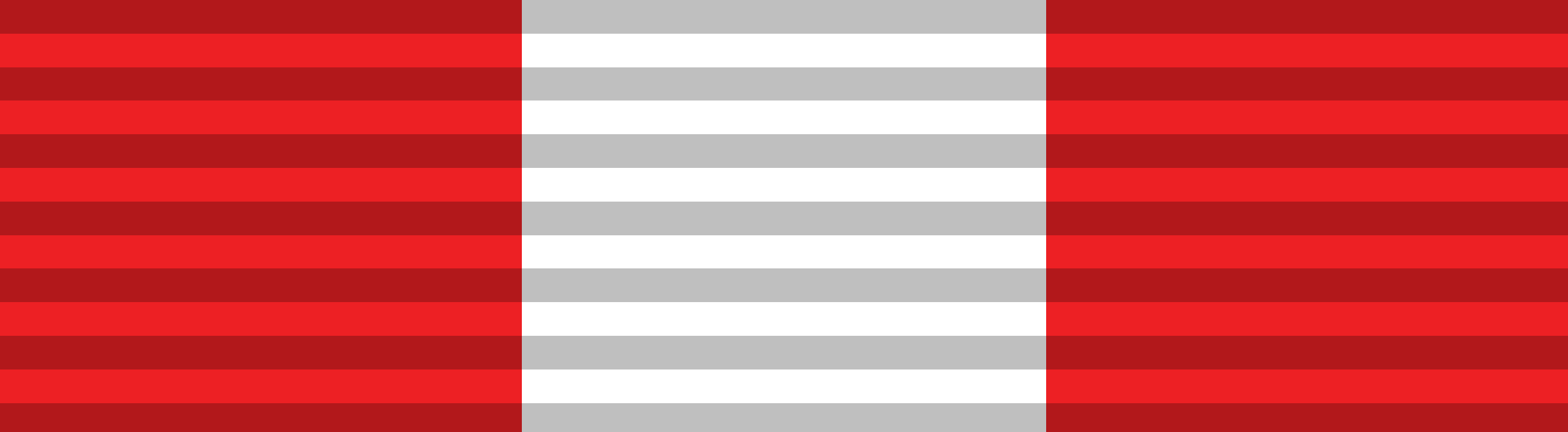
- Awards: Nishan-e-Imtiaz (Military) Hilal-e-Imtiaz (Military) Sitara-e-Imtiaz (Military) Tamgha-e-Imtiaz (Military) Order of King AbdulAziz Legion of Merit Turkish Legion of Merit

Noman Bashir (Urdu: نعمان بشير) NI(M) HI(M) SI(M) TI(M) was a Pakistan Navy admiral who served as the 18th Chief of Naval Staff (CNS) from 7 October 2008 until retiring on 7 October 2011.

His appointment as Chief of Naval Staff was approved by President Asif Ali Zardari on the recommendation of Defence Minister Ahmad Mukhtar on 5 October 2008, ultimately superseding the senior most, Vice-Admiral Asaf Humayun, to the four-star promotion.

In 2011, Adm. Bashir was notably superseded and overlooked for the appointment of Chairman joint chiefs when the junior-most officer, Lt-Gen. K. Shameem Wynne, was eventually selected despite coming short of his qualifications.

Admiral Bashir came under widespread criticism for failing to stop the siege of the Pakistan Naval air station PNS Mehran in time, which lead to the deaths of sailors, officers, destruction of Naval aircraft and damage to the base.

== Biography ==
=== Early life and education ===
After attending and securing his matriculation from the Army Burn Hall College in Abbottabad, Bashir was accepted to attend the Pakistan Naval Academy in 1971.

He passed out in 1973, and gained commissioned as S-Lt. in the Naval Operations Branch. He was further trained at the Pakistan Air Force Academy as a naval aviator, and joined the Pakistan Naval Air Arm as a combat helicopter pilot in 1975, and later qualified to fly the P3C Orion and various other aircraft in 1990s.

His brother, Salman Bashir, is a diplomat and former Foreign Secretary at the Ministry of Foreign Affairs.

After his combat pilot's training, Bashir was directed to attend the National Defence University in Islamabad where he studied at the Armed Forces War College (AFWC). He graduated with MSc in war studies and briefly lectured at AFWC, teaching courses on strategic studies. He was later sent to the United Kingdom to attend the Royal College of Defence Studies (RCDS) where he focused towards the geo-strategic studies, graduating with a master's degree.

At RCDS, his master's thesis, Afghanistan and the 'New Great Game' was shortlisted in the Seaford House Papers 2000. In it, he defended his claims that the Afghan Taliban "are inward rather than outward looking" and "they have also signalled readiness to engage constructively with the international community."

Moreover, he argued that "keeping Afghanistan broken and destabilized suits those who do not want the Caspian/Central Asian oil and gas pipelines to take one of the shortest and economical outlets over Afghanistan and Pakistan to the Arabian Sea."

== Career in the military ==
=== War and staff appointments in the Pakistan Navy ===
In 1971, Bashir served in the western front of the third war with India as a naval aviator, flying the army aviation's H-13 boarded on a warship, before joining the Pakistan Naval Academy in Karachi. A career naval aviator, Bashir commanded the two navy's combat aviation squadron before commanding the two warships: a Tariq-class frigate and a corvette. In 1995, Captain Bashir commanded the PNS Tariq, paying a visit to Singapore where he was joined by the RSS Valiant for bilateral exercise.

In 1999, Capt. Bashir was appointed to direct the inquiry board to investigate the probable cause of the Atlantique shootdown by the Indian Air Force, and later investigating the accident involving the P-3C Orion in 1999.

In 2000s, Cdre. Bashir briefly served as the Cdre-in-Charge of the Jinnah Naval Base in Balochistan, and later serving as the Commodore Training Ashore under the Flag Officer Sea Training (FOST) in Karachi. In 2003, Cdre. Bashir took over the command of the Naval Air Arm as Commander Naval Aviation (COMNAV), eventually promoted to the star-rank rank admiral in the Navy.

In 2004, R-Adm. Bashir was appointed as the Director-General of the Naval Intelligence (DGNI) which he directed the military intelligence until he was appointed as Commander of the Pakistan Armed Forces–Middle East in Oman in 2005.

Upon returning from deputation in 2006, R-Adm. Bashir was taken as secondment and directed as general manager at the Karachi Port Trust, and later posted as the DCNS (Projects-II) at the Navy NHQ in Islamabad until 2007.

On 19 July 2007, R-Adm. Bashir was elevated to the three-star rank in the Navy while serving in the Navy NHQ as DCNS (Projects-II). On 22 July 2007, Vice-Admiral Bashir became a senior fleet commander when he took over the command as the Commander Pakistan Fleet, and left the command on when he handed over the command to then-R-Adm. Shahid Iqbal on 20 June 2008.

On 20 June 2008, V-Adm. Bashir was appointed to command the Karachi coast as its Commander Karachi (COMKAR), which is responsible for entire naval combat units in Sindh and Balochistan.

== Chief of Naval Staff ==
I am duty-bound to continue to ensure the rightful maritime status for my country that it deserves so that it must be dealt and treated in proper manners.

— Cited source

Upon the retirement of Adm. Afzal Tahir being confirmed, Vice-Adm. Noman Bashir was in the race of the promotion to four-star rank alongside with four senior navy admirals included with seniority:

  - V-Adm. Asaf Humayun, senior fleet commander of Pakistan Fleet based in Karachi.
  - V-Adm. Noman Bashir, Commander of Karachi coast based in Karachi.
  - V-Adm. Saleem Minai, DCNS (Personnel) in Navy NHQ in Islamabad.
  - V-Adm. M. A. Khan, DCNS (Operations) in Navy NHQ in Islamabad.

On 5 October 2008, President Asif Zardari eventually promoted V-Adm. Bashir as the four-star admiral in the Navy and appointed Adm. Noman as Chief of Naval Staff (CNS), superseding the senior most V-Adm. Asaf Humayun who was moved to be appointed as Vice Chief of Naval Staff (VCNS).

It was reported that then-Defence Minister Ahmed Mukhtar had recommended Adm. Noman's name over V-Adm. Humayun to be elevated at the four-star rank. Eventually, V-Adm. Humayun was appointed as vice naval chief on 31 October 2008.

After assuming the command, Admiral Bashir thanked the president for the appointment and recognized the role of Navy facing the multiple challenges in the realm of maritime security due to the presence of various powers in Pakistan's area of interest.

Talking to the media, Bashir vowed that Navy to rise to the occasion to safeguard the national interests at any cost.

He commanded and coordinated the navy-army operations in north-western contingent of the country and expanded the role of navy on wide range of its operational capacity. Major deployments of navy was made under Admiral Bashir in all over the country to curbed the terrorism. Admiral Bashir earned public notability and public appraise after successfully executing the cross-border operation to evacuated the Pakistani nationals from Somalia. This cross border operation was conducted by Navy alone; and Admiral Bashir personally supervised the execution of the operation.

=== Indo-Pakistani standoff in 2008 ===
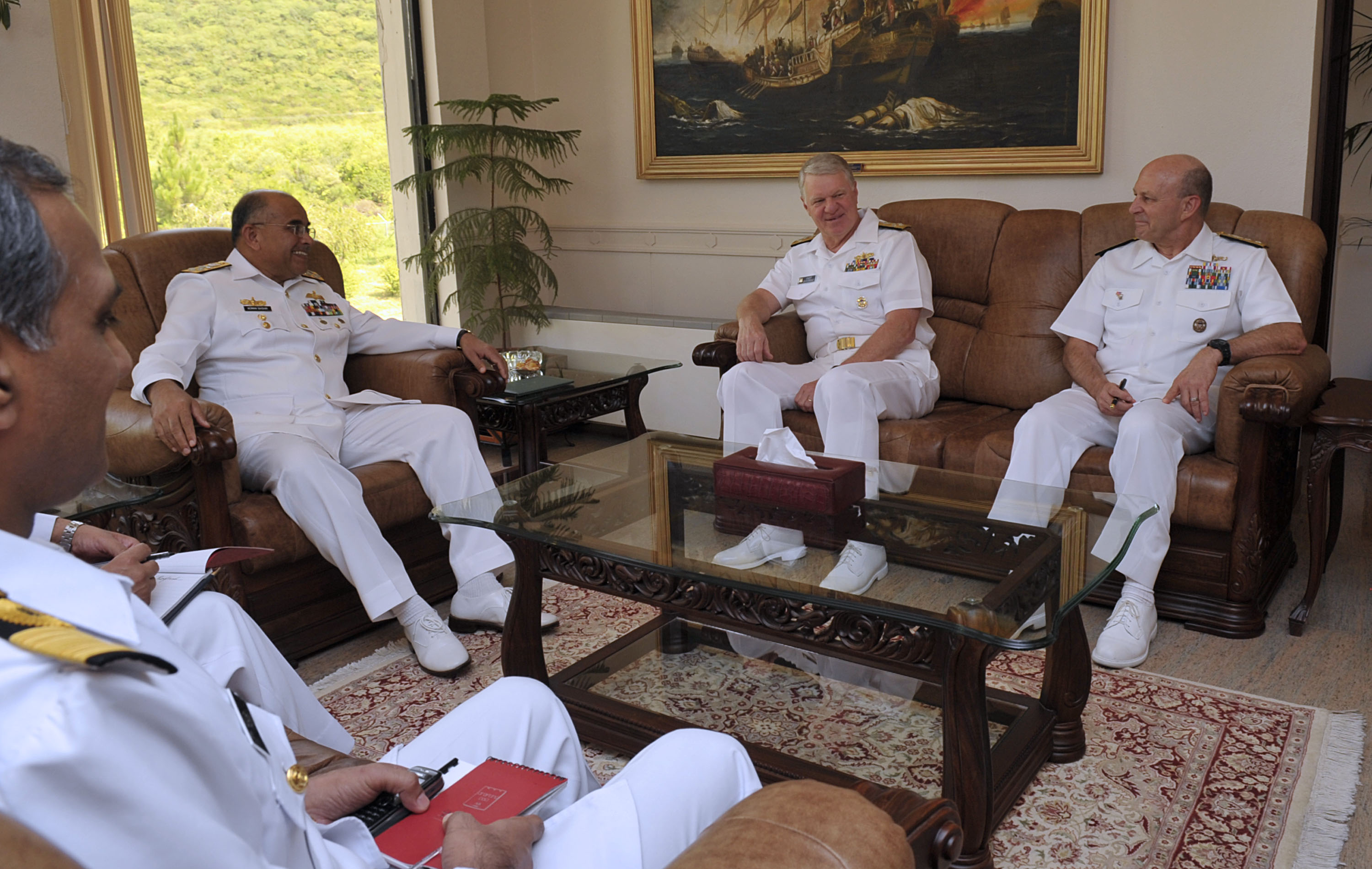
CNS Admiral Bashir meeting with American CNO Admiral Gary Roughead.

Only a month of assuming his role as Chief of Naval Staff, Adm. Bashir faced the major crises with neighboring India after the deadly attacks were perpetuated in Mumbai in November 2008. Adm. Bashir high-alerted the Navy and deployed the combatant commands of the Navy to protect the naval vicinity of Sindh and Balochistan. Initially, Adm. Bashir denied that the terrorists who attacked the city had not used the sea routes from Pakistan to reach the city. In a pressing briefing at the ISPR, Adm. Bashir maintained that: "We have no evidence whatsoever that [Ajmal Kasab] had gone to India from Pakistani waters. The Indian Navy is much larger than ours, and if Ajmal Kasab had gone from here, then what were their Coast Guards doing, and why did they did not stop the terrorists?."

His statement was widely criticized by Indian government and Indian Defence Minister A. K. Antony strongly rebutted his statement.

However, after a day of releasing his statement, Adm. Bashir retraced his statement and reiterated that "whatever evidence [Indians] have is correct." Adm. Bashir strongly criticized Indian army chief General Deepak Kapoor's statement about simultaneous war with China and Pakistan. Talking to the AAJ TV, Admiral Bashir quoted that :"Indian generals are well aware of our strength." He maintained to the television correspondents that he does not take Indian army chief General Deepak Kapoor's statement seriously as he "knows about the strength of his neighboring countries, Pakistan and China."

In 2008, in an interview to a Daily Pakistan, the Admiral Noman Bashir, had told his interviewer that "Pakistan was quite capable of building a nuclear submarine and would do so "if required". Pakistan is a "recognized nuclear power" and if the government made a decision, the nation would develop a naval variant nuclear weapon.

During this time, he began pushed and lobbied for building the nuclear submarine and finally, in February 2012, the government gave green signals and authorised the development of the nation's first nuclear submarine after releasing the funds. In 2010, Bashir noted that "the Indian Navy wants to increase military might in the region."

=== PNS Mehran attack ===
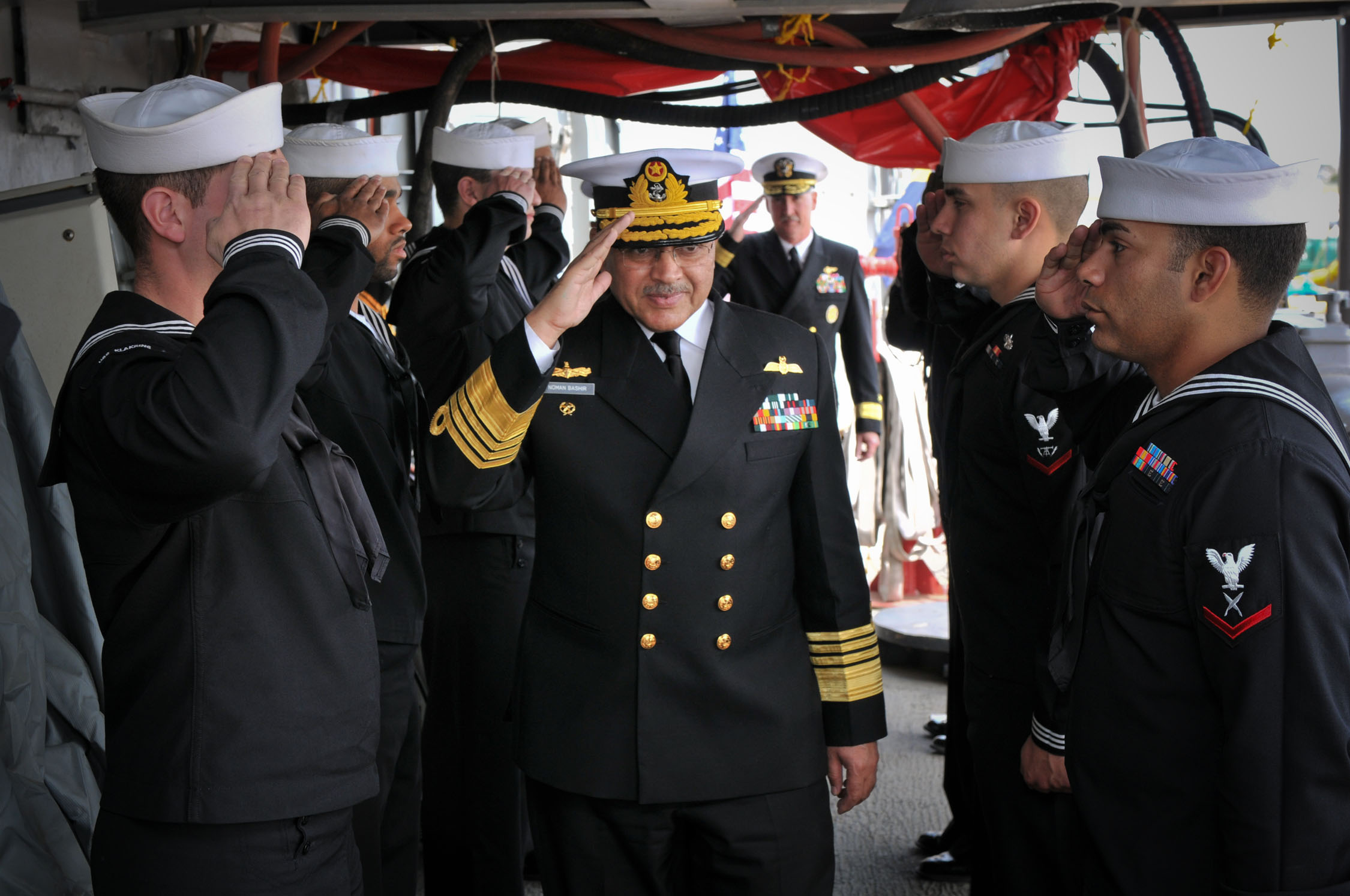
Admiral Bashir salutes to Navy personnel of Pakistan and U.S.

Admiral Noman Bashir was the chief of naval staff when Al Qaeda attacked PNS Mehran, a Pakistan Naval Air Station in retaliation for the killing of Osama Bin Ladin. Despite being Naval chief at the breach of the insurgency in the country his command failed to intercept the threat of an attack on a sensitive installation of the Pakistan Naval Air Arm, the failure of which lead to a day long siege of the base in the middle of Pakistan's largest city, Karachi. Admiral Bashir was widely criticized for not properly protecting the naval base from being attacked by group of terrorists or moving quickly enough to organise the defence of the base and the operation to take it back, leading to PNS Mehran being over-run by terrorists for nearly an entire day.

== Retirement ==
Noman Bashir retired with the pall of the PNS Mehran attack on his head. He rejected the accusations of security breach in the media. On 20 June 2011, Bashir submitted a report over the course of action to the Prime minister and briefed the Prime minister about the security arrangements which had been put in place following the attack on the naval base. During the last days of his term, Bashir supervised and personally gave commissioned of navy's first UAV squadron in Karachi. Upon his retirement in 2011, Admiral Bashir was considered to be on the "short list" of choices for Chairman of the Joint Chiefs of Staff Committee included with seniority:

  - Adm. Noman Bashir, Chief of Naval Staff headquartered Navy NHQ in Islamabad.
  - Gen. Ashfaq Parvez Kayani, Chief of Army Staff headquartered in Army GHQ in Rawalpindi.
  - Lt-Gen. K. Shameem Wynne, the Chief of General Staff headquartered in Army GHQ in Rawalpindi.

The eventual pick was the most-junior Army's general, Lt-Gen. Khalid Shameem Wynne, for the chairman joint chiefs appointment.

Earlier, the Pakistan government had sent the proposal to appoint General Ashfaq Parvez Kayani as the additional office of the Chairman Joint Chiefs of Staff Committee, but instead Kayani received the extension. However, the Pakistani media then reported since Admiral Bashir is the most senior officer, Admiral Bashir would likely to become the Chairman of the Joint Chiefs of Staff Committee.

In the line of promotion, General Khalid Shameem Wynne was the most-general in the Pakistan Army, as his chances to become Chief of Army Staff was diminished. On the advice of General Kayani, General Khalid Shameem Wynne was promoted to four-star rank and assumed the Chairmanship of Joint Chiefs of Staff Committee.

== Awards and decorations ==

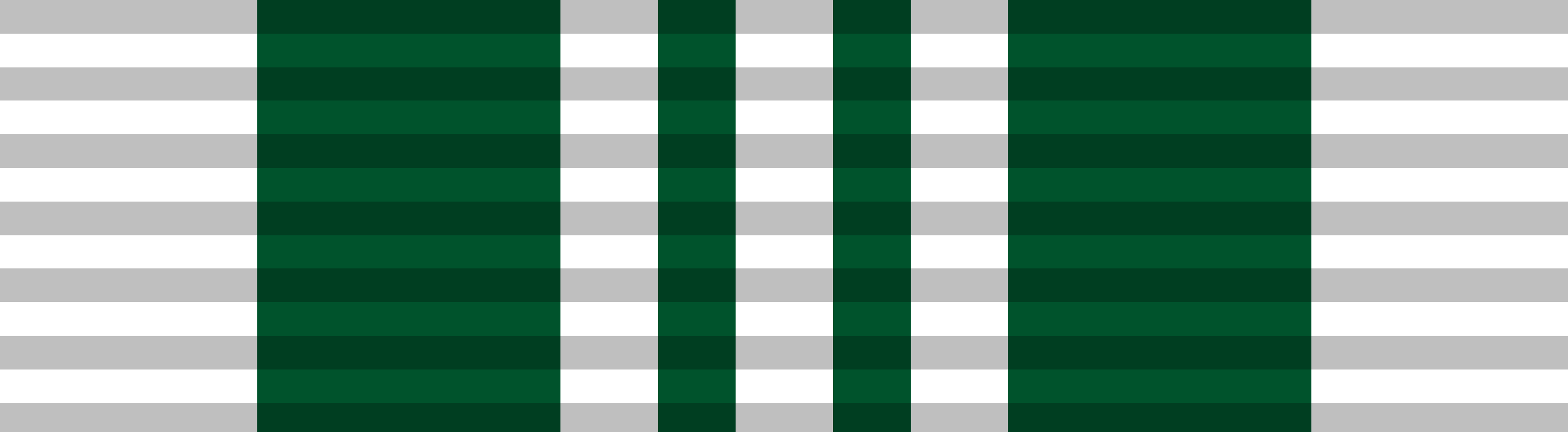

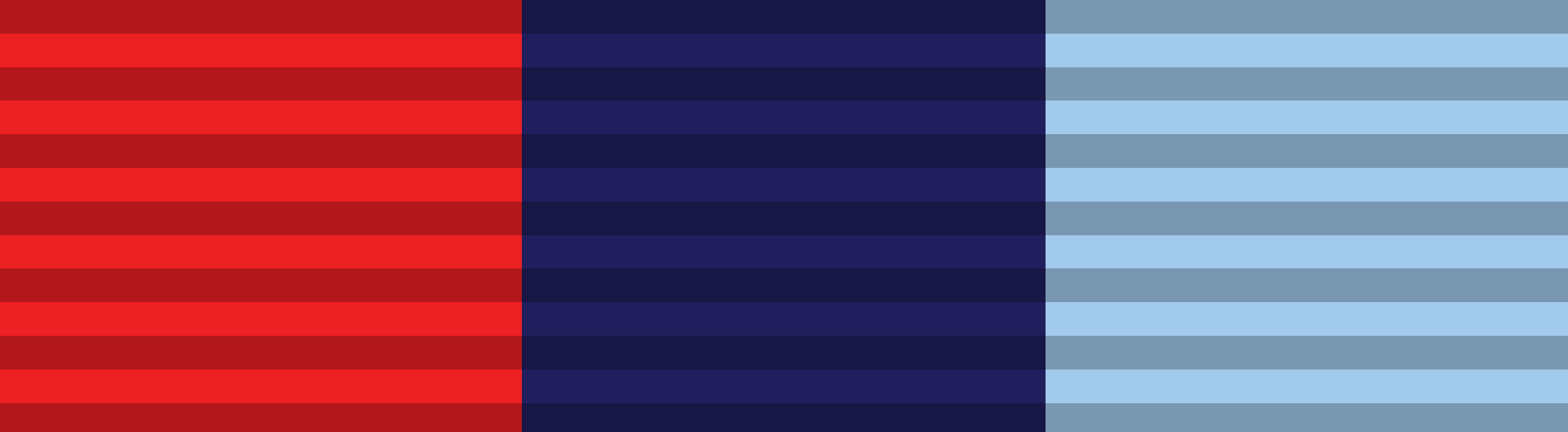

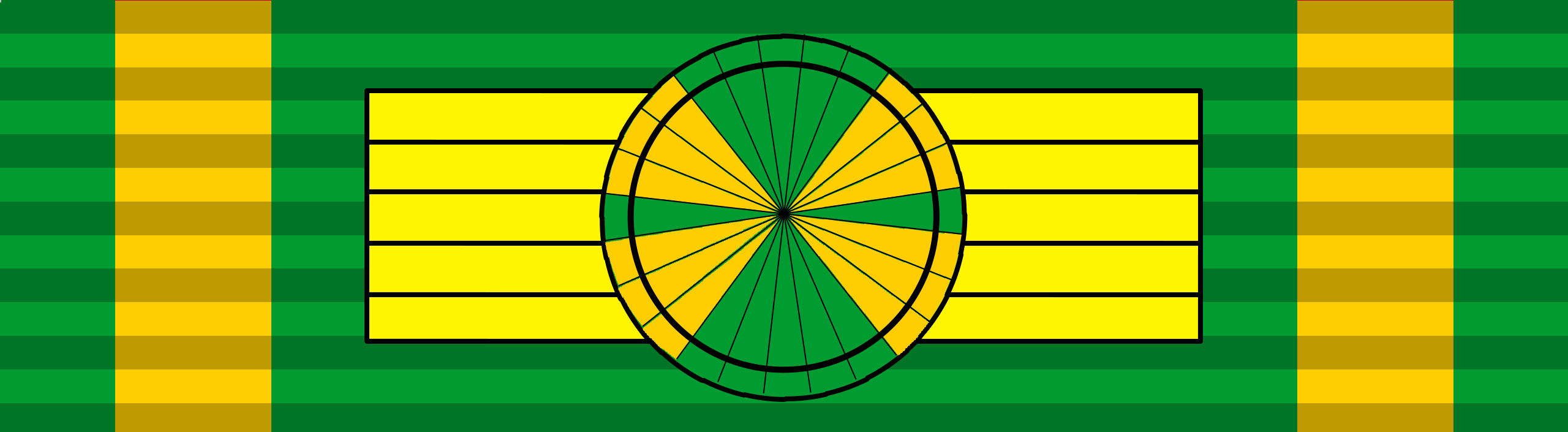

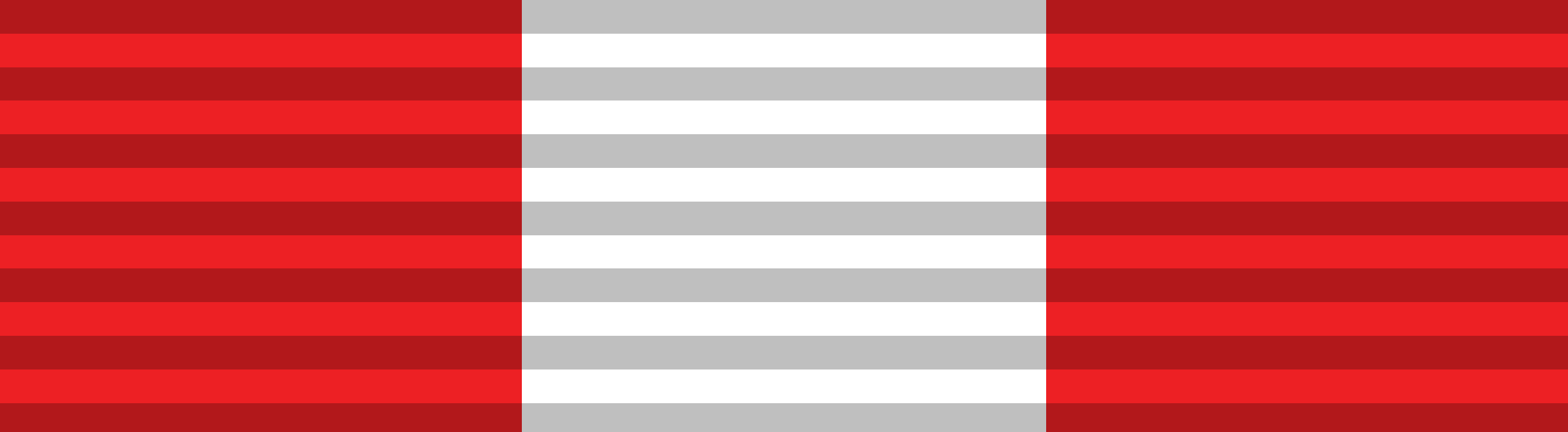

	Nishan-e-Imtiaz (Military) (Order of Excellence)		
Hilal-e-Imtiaz (Military) (Crescent of Excellence)	Sitara-e-Imtiaz (Military) (Star of Excellence)	Tamgha-e-Imtiaz (Military) (Medal of Excellence)	Sitara-e-Harb 1971 War (War Star 1971)
Tamgha-e-Jang 1971 War (War Medal 1971)	Tamgha-e-Baqa (Nuclear Test Medal) 1998	Tamgha-e-Istaqlal Pakistan (Escalation with India Medal) 2002	10 Years Service Medal
20 Years Service Medal	30 Years Service Medal	35 Years Service Medal	40 Years Service Medal
Tamgha-e-Sad Saala Jashan-e- Wiladat-e-Quaid-e-Azam (100th Birth Anniversary of Muhammad Ali Jinnah) 1976	Hijri Tamgha (Hijri Medal) 1979	Jamhuriat Tamgha (Democracy Medal) 1988	Qarardad-e-Pakistan Tamgha (Resolution Day Golden Jubilee Medal) 1990
Tamgha-e-Salgirah Pakistan (Independence Day Golden Jubilee Medal) 1997	Order of King AbdulAziz (1st Class) (Saudi Arabia)	The Legion of Merit (Degree of Commander) (United States) 2010	Turkish Legion of Merit (Turkey) 2011

Foreign Awards		Date Awarded
Saudi Arabia	Order of King Abdul Aziz (Class I)	
United States	The Legion of Merit (Degree of Commander)	18 March 2010
Turkey	Turkish Legion of Merit	7 September 2011

== See also ==
- Mirage 5 in the services of Pakistan Navy
- P3C Orion in Pakistan Navy

Military offices
Preceded by Afzal Tahir	Chief of Naval Staff; 2008 – 2011	Succeeded by Asif Sandila
