= 28 Squadron PN =

28 ASW Squadron
- ۲۸ سکواڈرن
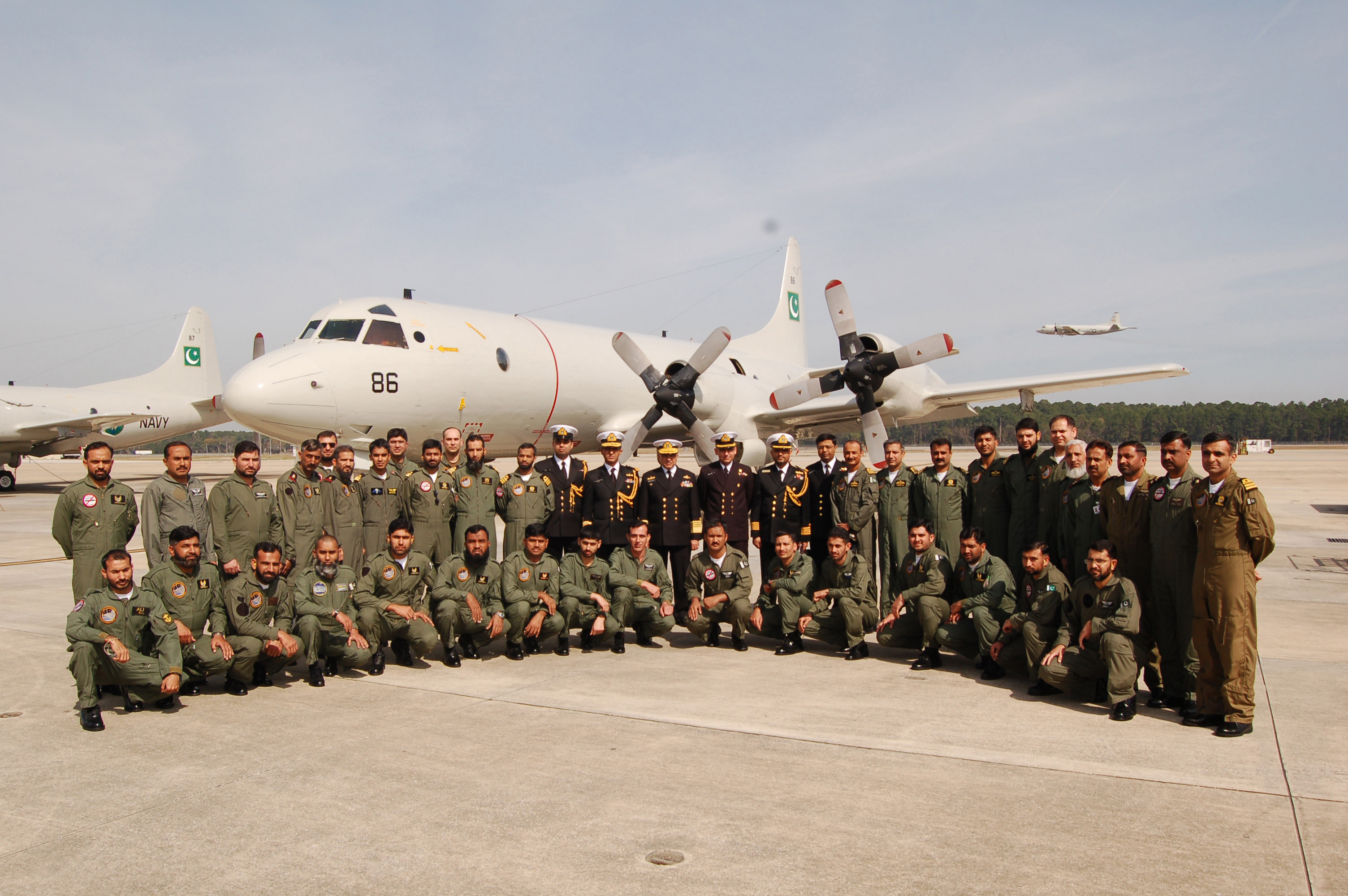
- Officers and sailors of the 28 ASW Squadron with the Navy's Chief Admiral Noman Bashir in 2010.
- Active: Since 1997 (28 years, 2 months)
- Country: Pakistan
- Allegiance: Pakistan Navy
- Branch: Pakistan Naval Air Arm
- Type: Squadron
- Role: ASW
- Station: PNS Mehran
- Anniversaries: 8 September (Navy day)
- Engagements: War on terror; Insurgency in Khyber Pakhtunkhwa

Aircraft flown
- Patrol: Lockheed P-3C Orion; Embraer Sea Sultan

28 ASW Squadron is a maritime patrol squadron of the Pakistan Navy stationed at PNS Mehran in Karachi. Equipped with Lockheed P-3C Orions, the squadron is assigned Anti-submarine warfare wartime role.

== History ==
28 Squadron was formed at PNS Mehran between 1996 and 1997 when the first batch of three Orions were inducted. In 2020, the navy initiated its LRMPA modernization program under which the P-3C Orions of 28 squadron would be replaced with 10 militarized versions of the Embraer Lineage-1000 jets also known as Sea Sultans. The first of these jets arrived at PNS Mehran in 2021 for which an induction ceremony attended by the navy's top brass was organized.

=== Operational history ===
The squadron's Orions were deployed on combat support operations at NWFP during Counter-insurgency ops in early 2010.

In 2019, a P-3C of the squadron alongside PNS Shamsheer and PNS Muhafiz took part in the International Maritime Exercise 2019 (IMX 19). At the same time an Orion was also deployed in the Aegean Sea for the Dogu Akdeniz-19 naval exercise with Turkey during which it reportedly breached into Greek airspace over disputed territory alongside several Turkish warplanes.

In 2021, a P-3C Orion intercepted an Indian Kulvari class submarine in Pakistani waters.

== Accidents ==
- In the 2011 PNS Mehran attack, the squadron lost two P-3C Orions which were blown up by the militants with RPGs.
- A Lockheed P-3C Orion of the 28 Squadron crashed off the coast of Pasni on 29 October 1999 during a routine patrol exercise resulting in the loss of 10 officers and 11 sailors. The wreckage was found submerged after 6 hours by navy helicopters.

== Media ==
- P-3C Orions of the 28 Squadron during the 2016 Pakistan Day Parade
- 28 Squadron personnel receive German navy Lockheed P-3 Orion on goodwill visit at PNS Mehran

== See also ==
- 333 Squadron PN
