= List of active Pakistan military aircraft =

Emblem of the Pakistan armed forces.

This is a list of military aircraft in active service with the Pakistan Armed Forces.

== See also ==
- Pakistan Air Force
- Pakistan Army Aviation Corps
- Pakistan Naval Air Arm
