= Operation Madad (Pakistan Navy) =

Military Operation

- Part of Emergency response to 2010 Pakistan floods
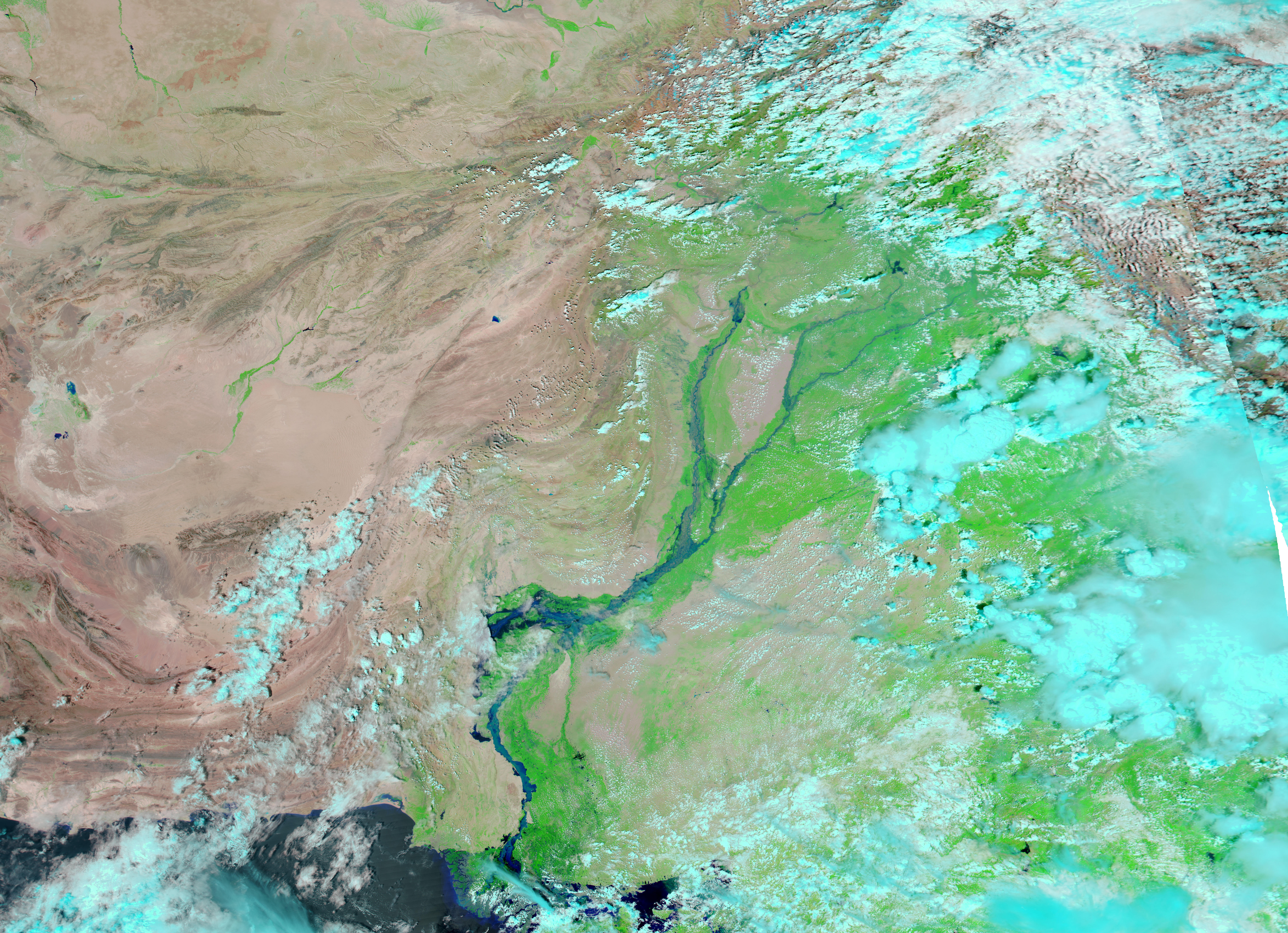
- Satellite image of the Indus River at the time of floods.
- Type: Emergency response
- Location: Flood affected areas of Pakistan
- Planned by: Pakistan Navy
- Objective: Search and rescue, disaster relief, humanitarian relief, rehabilitation, and reconstruction
- Date: June 4, 2010 — February 2011
- Executed by: Pakistan Navy

Operation Madad was a non-combative and assistance military operation commenced and executed by Pakistan Navy after the massive national floods hit the country. Its primary operations were to conduct SAR raids to support affected areas of Pakistan following the 2010 Pakistan floods. Madadwas the major and the largest naval operation commenced by the Pakistan Navy since the 1971 Naval conflict.

== Bases and Operations ==
The naval bases that were involved and served as the major bases in Operation Madad.

- PNS Ahsan in Gwader — served as the Operation Commander Center for affectees of Balochistan Province.
- PNS Makran — served as air hub for the naval air aviation
- Jinnah Naval Base — supervised the entire operation
- PNS Mehran — provided air operations in Sindh Province.

== Operation ==
Vice-Admiral Abass Raza, Deputy Chief of Naval Staff of Naval Operations, state that:"[A]ll assets of Pakistan Navy have been made safe and secured in case the cyclone ‘Phet’ hits the coastal areas of Karachi and parts of Balochistan.

Chief of Naval Staff Admiral Noman Bashir personally supervised the operation.
