= Naval Air Arm =

The term Naval Air Arm or Fleet Air Arm refers to the naval aviation branch of several naval forces, including:

- The Indian Naval Air Arm
- The Pakistan Naval Air Arm
- The Fleet Air Arm of the Royal Navy
- The Royal Australian Navy Fleet Air Arm (RAN)
