= PNS Hafeez Hospital =

Pakistani military unit

PNS Hafeez
- Active: 1974 – present
- Country: Pakistan
- Branch: Pakistan Navy
- Type: Military hospital
- Size: 250 Bedded Hospital in 2023
- Nickname: Pakistan Naval Complex Hospital

Commanders
- Surgeon Commander of Pakistan Navy: Surgeon Commodore Muhammad Rafique

The Pakistan Navy Ship Hafeez or PNS Hafeez is a Pakistan Navy-operated hospital located in Naval Headquarters, Islamabad.

== History ==
PNS Hafeez started functioning in March 1974 as a Sick Bay (of 25 beds) and later on 12 June 1976 was upgraded to Naval Medical Center (50 beds). PNS HAFEEZ was commissioned on March 24, 1986 (150 beds). Later it was upgraded as 197 beds and 250 beds in 2008 and 2020.
