= Jinnah Naval Base =

Pakistani navy base

- جناح بحری مستقر
- Part of Pakistan Navy
- Ormara, Balochistan, Pakistan

Site information
- Type: Naval base
- Owner: Pakistan Navy
- Controlled by: Pakistan Navy

Location
- Coordinates: 25°12′04″N 64°40′02″E

Jinnah Naval Base (Urdu: جناح بحری مستقر) is a strategic naval base of the Pakistan Navy located at Ormara, Balochistan, Pakistan. It is named after Pakistan's founder, Mohammad Ali Jinnah. It is Pakistan's second largest naval base.

== Location ==
Jinnah Naval Base is situated about 240 km west (149 miles) of Karachi at Ormara in the Gwadar District of Pakistan's Balochistan province. By land, via the Makran Coastal Highway it is 350 km (217.48 miles) from Karachi and 285 km from Gwadar.

== Construction history ==
The Ministry of Defence approved the proposal to construct the naval base away from the maritime boundaries of India, with the intent of lowering the risk inherent to the Port of Karachi being blockaded as it was during the 1971 war. The contract was initially awarded to two European countries–Belgium and Turkey– with the ground breaking ceremony taking place on 17 March 1994. The project was aimed towards spending ₨. 4.5Bn (500Mn. USD), and the contract was awarded to Turkish firms, STFA Group and STM, Belgium firm, Jan De Nul, and Pakistani firms, FWO and MES.

In 1994, then-Chief of the Naval Staff Adm. Mansural Haq stated that the base was expected to become operational by March 1997.

On 22 June 2000, the Jinnah Naval Base was inaugurated by then-Chief Executive Gen. Pervez Musharraf in a ceremony attended by Faruk Bal, the Turkish Minister of State, and V-Adm. Taj Muhammad. Gen. Musharraf termed the opening of the base "a long-standing requirement of Pakistan Navy that had become a reality after many years of hard work." He went on to implicitly state that the base was a principal means of deterrence against growing Indian hegemony in the region, which would otherwise threaten Pakistan's economic and geopolitical interests. Construction of the N-10 National Highway, connecting the base to other major strategic coastal sites in Pakistan, namely Karachi and the Gwadar deep-water port, was announced at the ceremony.

== Salient features ==
Jinnah Naval Base can provide berthing facilities to eight warships and four submarines at a time. This facility can be expanded in future with the expansion of the base. Publications from the U.S. Naval Institute indicate that Jinnah is likely to be used in the future to house some or all of these vessels. The base is currently in the process of modernizing to meet Pakistan's increasing defence needs. For the purpose of developing a future naval officer class, the Cadet College Ormara was established in 2017.

== Submarine base ==
In April 2014, the Pakistan Navy announced that it was in the process of shifting primary operations and naval assets, including its entire fleet of diesel-electric submarines (SSKs), from Karachi to the Jinnah Naval Base in Ormara, citing Karachi's pollution, congestion from increasing commercial activity, and proximity to India as reasons for the move.

Following Xi Jinping's visit to Pakistan in 2015, the Pakistani Navy signed a deal with China Shipbuilding & Offshore International Co. to produce 8 Hangor-II-class submarines (an export variant of the Chinese 039B Yuan-class) for its fleet. Four ships were to be built by Wuchang Shipbuilding Industry Group (WSIG) in Wuhan, China. The other four were to be built by Karachi Shipyard & Engineering Works in Pakistan by means of technological transfer.

Though the initial timetable called for completion of all ships between 2022 and 2028, it was announced in 2016 that four ships would be launched between 2022 and 2023, with the final four ships being completed by 2028. Production was stalled, though, by the refusal of Germany in the early 2020s to provide end-use certification approval for the installation of Rolls Royce MTU396 diesel engines needed to operate the vessels at full capacity. German authorities in March 2022 cited an arms embargo imposed on the PRC in the aftermath of the 1989 Tiananmen Square Massacre in their decision to restrict the export of retrofitted engines to shipbuilding companies producing subs for the Thai and Pakistani Navies, though notably not for Chinese domestic manufacturers. In October 2023, Thai officials exited a $402 million deal signed in 2017 with the Chinese to purchase variants of the Yuan-class S26T, citing doubts about the reliability of Chinese variants on the MTU design (though they later agreed to continue). The Thai order was due prior to the Pakistanis', meaning that its cancellation freed up factors of production for the Pakistanis who, in contrast, were willing to retrofit their ships with Chinese CHD 620 diesel engines. The first submarine was launched at Wuchang's Shuangliu Base on 26 April 2024, with Admiral Naveed Ashraf of the Pakistan Navy serving as Chief Guest in attendance.

A 'very low frequency' (VLF) station in Sindh Province, commissioned as PNS Hamid, has been funded by the Pakistani military to facilitate secure submarine communications as well. The commissioning of the first Hangor-class submarine will mark Pakistan's first vessel with an air-independent propulsion (AIP) system. These acquisitions, as well as others, mark an effort by Pakistan to modernize its forces for the conditions they face in the twenty-first century.

== See also ==
- PNS Ahsan
- PNS Makran
- PNS Mehran
- PNS Qasim
- Karachi Naval Dockyard
- Karachi Shipyard
