= Exercise Mavi Balina =

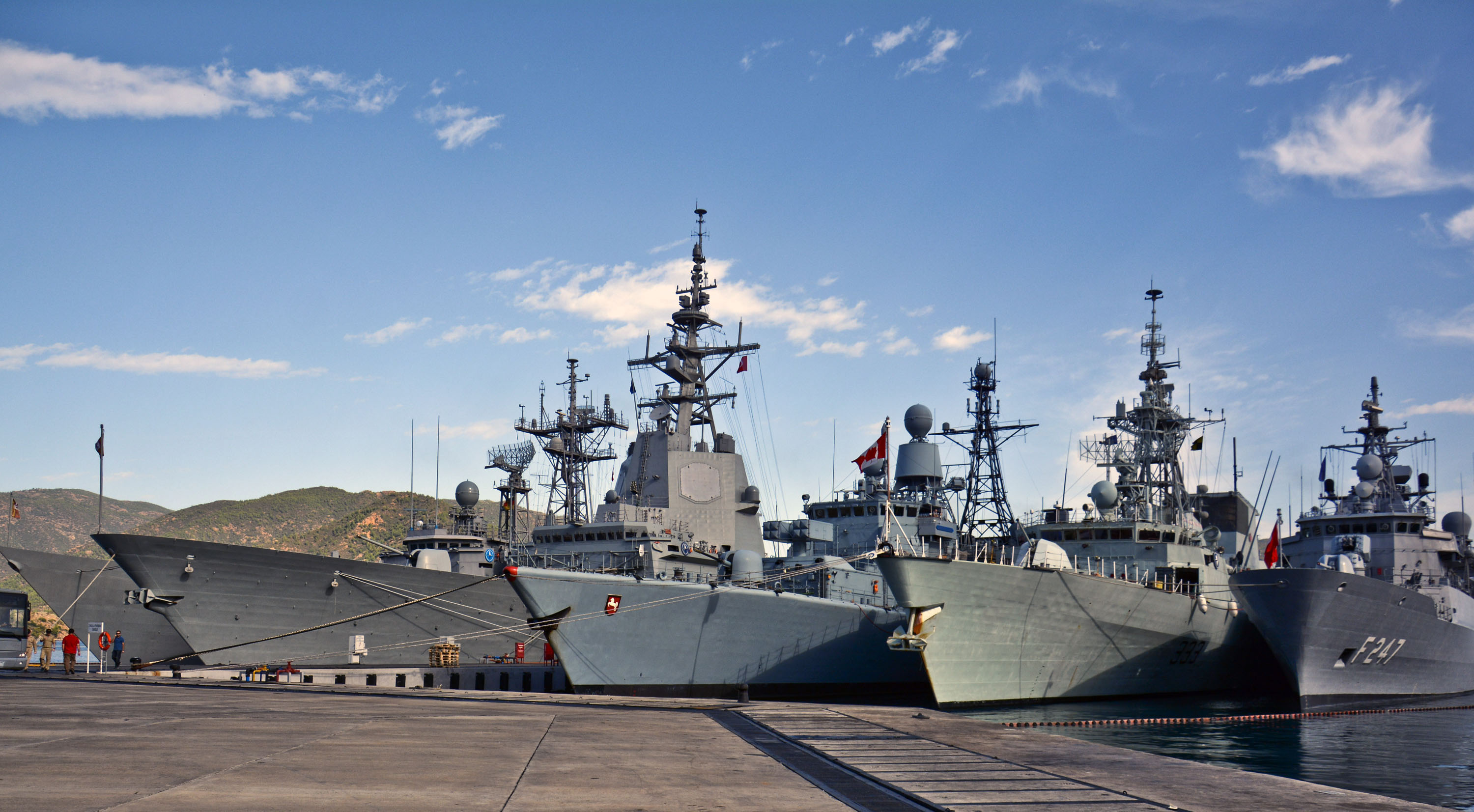
- Standing NATO Maritime Group 2 ships are moored preparing to participate in exercise at Aksaz Naval Base, Turkey
- Headquarters: Aksaz Naval Base, Marmaris, Turkey
- Type: Military exercise
- Participants: 2016: Turkey; Bulgaria; Canada; Pakistan; Romania; Spain; United States

Exercise Mavi Balina (Exercise Blue Whale) is an international anti submarine warfare exercise led by Turkish Naval Forces.

Blue Whale is held biennially as invitation only basis and considered as the largest anti-submarine warfare exercise in the Mediterranean. It is hosted and administered by the Turkish Naval Forces Fleet Command. Exercise's main headquarters is at Aksaz Naval Base.

The aim of the exercise is providing realistic operational training in surface and submarine warfare for units and staffs of participating countries, as well as promote friendship, mutual understanding and cooperation.
