= PNS Ahsan =

Pakistan Navy's air station in Makran coast near Ormara

- Part of Southern Command
- Makran coast, Balochistan, Pakistan; Near Ormara, Balochistan, Pakistan
- Badge of Pakistan Navy

Site information
- Type: Military
- Owner: Pakistan MoD
- Operator: Naval Air Arm
- Controlled by: Pakistan Navy
- Open to the public: No
- Condition: Operational
- Nickname: AHSAN; Remote Data Station– Mianwali (RDS– Mianwali) (1970–90)
- Website: paknavy.gov.pk

Location
- Coordinates: 25°11′N 64°36′E

Site history
- Built: 1991; 35 years ago
- Built by: Pakistan Army Corps of Engineers
- Fate: Active

Garrison information
- Current commander: Commander Naval Aviation (COMNAV)
- Occupants: 333 Squadron Navy

The Pakistan Navy Station Ahsan (reporting name: PNS Ahsan) is a naval air station of the Pakistan Navy located in Makran, Balochistan, Pakistan.

The naval air station is namesake in the memory of Vice-Admiral S. M. Ahsan and serves as a logistics and surveillance base for the Pakistani military operational mandate.

== History ==
In 1970, the administrative establishment was carried out under then-Rear-Admiral K. R. Niazi who supervised the construction of the base. From 1970–90, the naval station was known as the "Remote Data Station–Mianwali" and was namesake in the memory of the Vice-Admiral S. M. Ahsan when it was commissioned as a naval air station by Adm. Yastur-ul-Haq Malik, the Chief of Naval Staff, on 30 October 1991. The PNS Ahsan serves under the Southern Command and provides all logistics air support and surveillance activities for the Pakistani military.

Since the active deployment on 7 June 2010, the Pakistan Navy's Air Arm has stationed 333 Sq. Navy to address the logistics and relief operations as part of the Operation Help. The naval air stationed has supervised the distribution of more than 15000 kg relief goods to Gwadar affectees.

The PNS Ahsan facilitates the logistical support to nearby Jinnah Naval Base and supports its Electronic intelligence (ELINT) collection as well as coordination with the Navy's Air Defense Arm based in Ormara. The naval air station also provides training platform for Navy to conduct the exercises on HALO Operations for the SEAL Teams of the Special Service Group Navy.
