= Pakistan Army Aviation Corps =

Pakistan Army staff corps for Army Aviation

- Insignia of the Corps of Aviation
- Founded: 15 August 1947 (as PAF's No.1 Air OP Flight); 1958; 68 years ago (as Pakistan Army's Aviation Corps)
- Country: Pakistan
- Branch: Pakistan Army
- Type: Army aviation, Combined and Combat support service
- Role: Administrative and staffing oversight.
- Headquarters: Qasim Army Aviation Base in Dhamial, Rawalpindi
- Nickname: AVN
- Colors identification: Purple, White, Yellow
- Anniversaries: 1958
- Engagements: Military history of Pakistan

Commanders
- Director-General: Maj-Gen. Saeed Anwar
- Notable commanders: Brigadier Zakaullah Bhangoo

Insignia
- War Flag

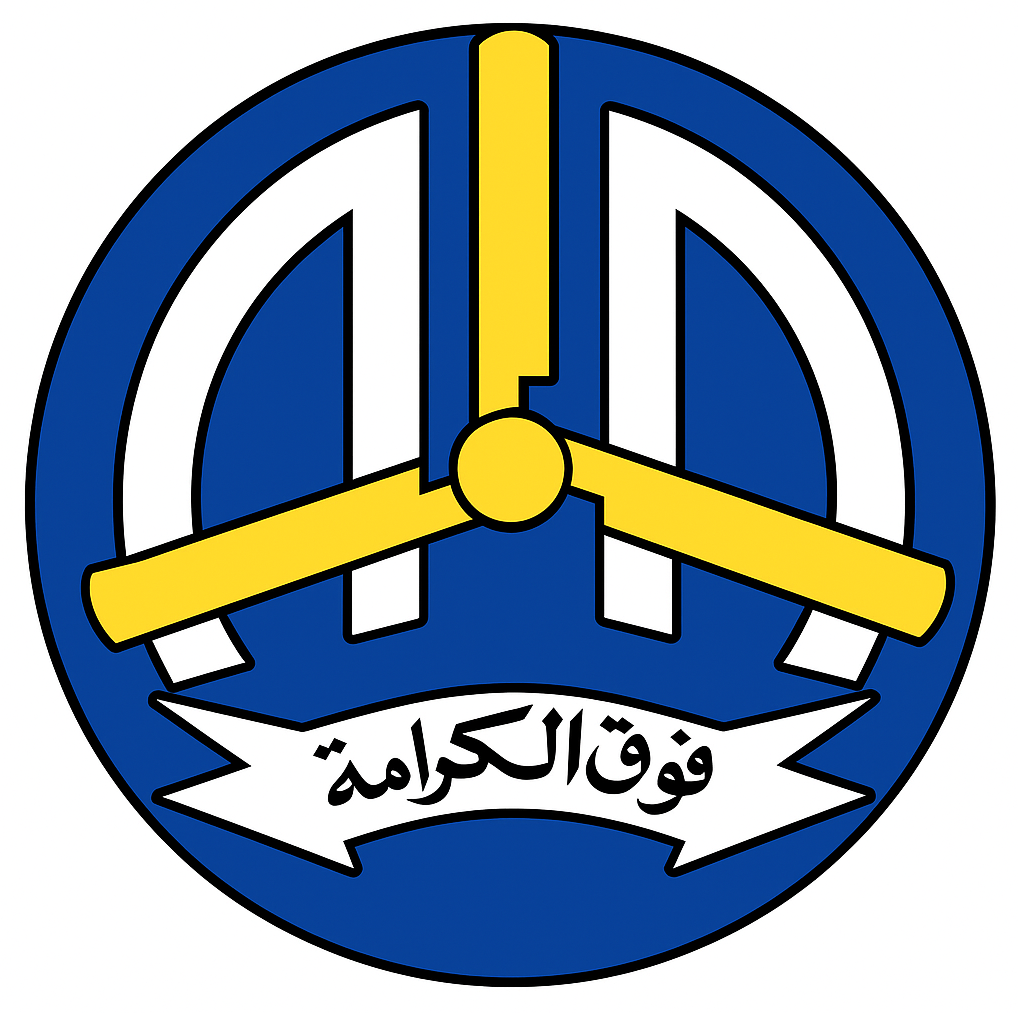
- Patch

Aircraft flown
- Attack helicopter: Bell AH-1 Cobra; Mil Mi-24/35; Changhe Z-10; Eurocopter Fennec
- Multirole helicopter: AW139; Bell 412
- Trainer helicopter: Bell 206; Enstrom F-28; Schweizer S300; Bell UH-1 Huey
- Utility helicopter: Aérospatiale SA 330 Puma; IAR 330; Aérospatiale Alouette III; Aérospatiale Lama
- Reconnaissance: Beechcraft Super King Air
- Transport: Beechcraft Super King Air; Harbin Y-12; Turbo Commander 690C; Cessna 206; Cessna 208 Caravan; Cessna Citation V Cessna Citation II; Gulfstream G450

The Pakistan Army Corps of Aviation is a military administrative and combined arms service branch of the Pakistan Army. The Aviation Corps is tasked with configuration of all army aviation aircraft and provides principle close aerial combat support and aerial logistics for the Pakistan Army.

== Overview ==
The earliest use of aircraft by the army can be traced to the air observation posts (Air OP), where aeroplanes were used during the World War I to help artillery spotters (Forward Observation Officers) to locate and direct artillery fire to targets on the ground. This role was improved upon and further refined in the World War II. The Army Aviation wing of the Royal Air Force was established in India at in 1942. No. 656 Air OP Squadron (RAF), the first Air OP unit reached the Indian subcontinent in 1943 to assist the operations in the Burma campaign. Following the war, 659 Squadron of the Royal Air Force, which had played an important role as an air observation post unit and worked closely with Army units in artillery spotting and liaison was despatched to India on October 1945. On 14 August 1947, No.659 (Air OP) Squadron was disbanded at Lahore (which was deployed there in support of the Punjab Boundary Commission) and partitioned between India and Pakistan. On the next day the Air OP Squadron became part of the Royal Pakistan Air Force (RPAF) as "No.1 Air Observation Post Flight". While still relying on RPAF administrative and technical infrastructure, Army officers (primarily from the Corps of Artillery, starting with Capt. Azmat Baksh Awan in June 1948) began qualifying as Air OP pilots and replacing RPAF aircrew for No. 1 Air OP Flight. During the 1950s, Pakistan Army officers selected for Air Observation Post duties were trained directly by RPAF instructors, flying schools, and squadrons before completing their advanced operational training. They were trained on Tiger Moth aircraft before transitioning to No. 1 Air OP Flight for advanced training on Auster aircraft. On June 20, 1956, No. 1 Air OP Flight was formally upgraded and re-designated as No. 1 Air OP Squadron. Pakistan Army took full control over No. 1 Air OP Squadron after its personnel were trained and certified in the United States in 1958. The Corps of Electrical and Mechanical Engineering started to maintain the aircraft and helicopters given by the U.S. Army's Aviation Branch, opening its own aviation school on 1 January 1959.

Since the 1960s, the corps expanded in momentum, manpower, and its operational scope has widened. The Aviation Corps became a combat support branch when it inducted its first attack helicopters from Iran in 1970. Although it came into existence in 1947, the corps was given a full commission on 2 March 1978. The Aviation Corps is commanded by an active-duty two star major-general, who serves as its director-general and functions directly under the Chief of the General Staff at the Army GHQ in Rawalpindi, Punjab.

== Aircraft inventory ==
The Pakistan Army Aviation currently operates (474) helicopters along with (314) fixed-wing aircraft.

Aircraft/System	Photo	Origin	Role	Variant	Quantity	Note	Service period
Helicopter’s (474)
Changhe Z-10		China	Attack	Z-10ME	5	Total 60 ordered	2025–present
Bell AH-1 Cobra		United States	Attack	AH-1F	55		1985–present
Mil Mi-35		Russia	Attack	Mi-35M3	4		2018–present
Eurocopter AS350 Écureuil		France	Attack, Utility	AS350	30		2006–present
Eurocopter Fennec		France	Armed / Scout	H125M	37		2009–present
Mil Mi-17		Russia	Transport; Utility	Mi-171	94		1996–present
Aérospatiale SA 330 Puma IAR 330		France; Romania	SAR; Utility	SA.330L 330L	50		1977–present
AgustaWestland AW139		Italy	SAR; Utility	AW139M	21		2017–present
Bell 412		United States	MEDEVAC; Utility	412EPI	65		2004–present
Bell UH-1 Iroquois		United States	Utility	UH-1H	18	6 gifted by the US.	1974–present
Eurocopter AS350 Écureuil		France	Light Utility	AS350	30		2006–present
Aérospatiale Alouette III		France	Light Utility	SA 316B	13	The first utility helicopter of Pak Army. Inducted in 3 Squadron on 18 October 1967.	1967–present
Aérospatiale Lama		France	Light Utility	SA 315B	17		1986–present
Schweizer 300		United States	Trainer	300C	25		1993–present
Bell 206 JetRanger		United States	Trainer	206B	20		1975–present
Enstrom F-28		United States	Trainer	280FX	20		2018–present
Fixed Wing (314)
PAC MFI-17 Mushshak		Pakistan; Sweden	Trainer		250		1978-present
Beechcraft Super King Air		United States	Reconnaissance	350i	3	for SIGINT & ISR	
Beechcraft Super King Air		United States	Utility	350ER	6		
Harbin Y-12		China	Utility	Y-12(II)/F	4		
Turbo Commander		United States	Utility	690C	2		
Cessna 208 Caravan		United States	MEDEVAC	208B	13		
Cessna 206 Stationair		United States	MEDEVAC	T206H	4		
Cessna Citation II		United States	VIP Transport	Citation Bravo	1		
Cessna Citation V		United States	VIP Transport	Citation Ultra	1		
Bombardier Challenger 605		Canada	VIP Transport	CL-605	1		
Gulfstream IV		United States	VIP Transport	G450	1		
Gulfstream G600		United States	VIP Transport	G600	1		

=== Retired Aircraft ===
Aircraft/System	Acquired	Retired	Note
Auster 5	1947	1957	
Auster AOP.6	1947	1957	
Cessna O-1 Bird Dog	1957	1990	
Beechcraft U-8F Seminole	1963	1983	
Bell OH-13 Sioux	1964	1990	The first helicopters operated by Pakistan Army. They were inducted and first flown on 24 September 1964.
Bell Model 47	1964	1990	
Mil Mi-6	1968	1968	Sole Mi-6 flown by Pakistan Air Force for the Army Aviation Corp, until its crash during an evaluation flight on 27 July 1968.
Mil Mi-8	1969	1998	Acquired on 21 January 1969.

== Notable accidents and incidents ==
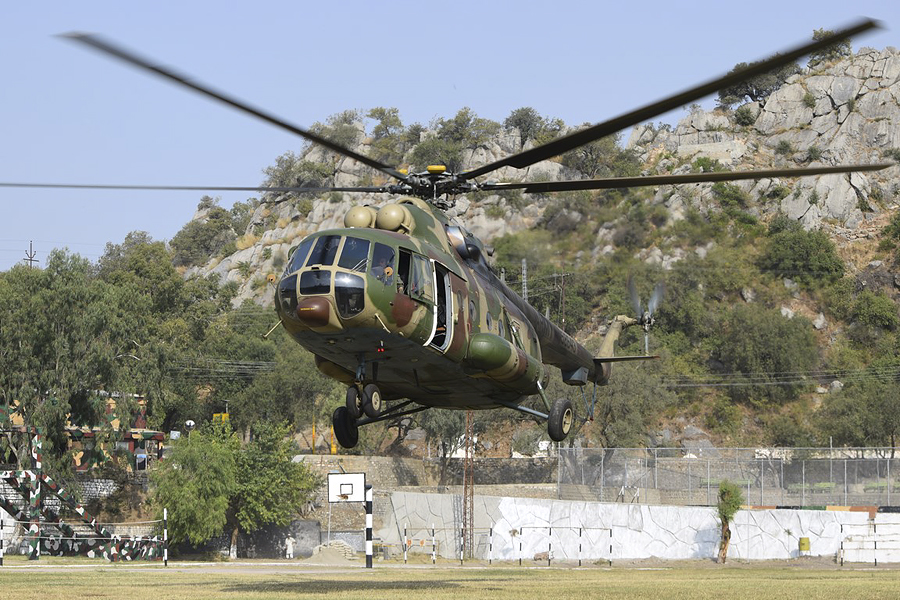
The Mil Mi-17 (with Pakistani military markings) participating in combat support operations in coordination with Russian forces in 2017

- 2022 Pakistan Army helicopter incident: On 1st August a helicopter, which was on flood relief operations in Lasbela District of Balochistan, lost contact with Air Traffic Control. The six military personnel, including Commander XII Corps Lieutenant General Sarfraz Ali died in the crash. Reports from Pakistani authorities on their early investigations attributed the crash to poor weather conditions, with fog being the main culprit, due to which the Helicopter crashed into a mountain.
- 29 March 2022 – Eight UN peacekeepers, six Pakistanis, a Russian and a Serb, part of the United Nations Stabilization Mission in the Democratic Republic of the Congo were killed in a crash of a Puma helicopter operated by the Pakistan Army Aviation Corps while on a reconnaissance mission in the troubled eastern Democratic Republic of the Congo.
- 2019 Pakistan Army military plane crash
- 2015 Pakistan Army Mil Mi-17 crash
- 2009 Pakistan Army Mil Mi-17 crash

== See also ==
- Pakistan Air Force
- List of active Pakistan Air Force aircraft
- List of aircraft of the Pakistan Naval Air Arm
- Equipment of the Pakistan Army
