= PNS Mehran attack =

2011 Tehrik-i-Taliban attack in Sindh, Pakistan

- Part of series of insurgent attacks in Pakistan
Date	22–23 May 2011
Location	Karachi, Sindh, Pakistan 24.0°N 67.0°E
Result	Pakistan Navy re-captures naval base: No hostages were taken; Militants killed in action; Naval surveillance planes destroyed

Belligerents
Pakistan; Pakistan Navy	(Afghanistan) TTP; Al-Qaeda

Commanders and leaders
Lieutenant Yasser Abbas †	Ehsanullah Ehsan; Azam Tariq; Ayman al-Zawahiri; Ilyas Kashmiri †

Units involved
Naval Special Service Group–SSG(N); Special Security Unit Sindh Police	15-man-strong terrorist squad

Strength
500+	15 terrorists

Casualties and losses
Killed in action (total 18): 11 naval officers 1 fireman 3 SSG(N) officers 1 sailor 2 Army Rangers; Wounded in Action: 16 naval personnel Physical damage: 2 P3C Orion aircraft destroyed.	Killed in Action: 4 militants Wounded in Action; 5 militants Caught: 4 militants 2 militants escaped
- Location within Pakistan

The PNS Mehran attack was an attack/shooting by Tehrik-i-Taliban Pakistan (TTP) and Al Qaeda which took place on 22 May 2011, at PNS Mehran, the headquarters of the Pakistan Navy's Naval Air Arm and the most populous Pakistani military installation, located near the PAF's Faisal Air Force Base of Karachi, Sindh.

In the course of the event, 15 attackers killed 18 military personnel and wounded 16 in a sophisticated terrorist attack which lasted 16 hours. Two American-built P-3C Orion surveillance aircraft were destroyed.

According to the United States and Western intelligence sources, the attack was far more dangerous than the 2009 Pakistan Army General Headquarters attack, and was better planned and more rehearsed than the previous attack. It was the biggest attack on the Navy and its assets since 1971, and is believed to have been the last major attack of militant mastermind Ilyas Kashmiri. The Special Service Group (Navy) (SSG (N)), carried out the counter-attack, which was the largest operation led by SSG (N).

== Motive for the attack ==
The Pakistan Navy noted al-Qaeda members within its ranks. Raids were carried out and certain members were arrested by the Naval Intelligence. The talks that ensued between the Navy and the al-Qaeda did not succeed, since the Navy did not release the arrested members. Warnings were issued and after the death of Osama bin Laden, al-Qaeda attacked the naval base.

== TTP preparation against the Navy ==
A month prior to the attack on PN Naval Base Mehran, the Pakistan Navy was twice targeted for bombings in various locations of Karachi by unknown perpetrators. The first of the bombings took place on 21 April 2011 on two naval buses and the second attack happened on 28 April 2011 on a naval coaster. An estimated 12 lives (all of them were medical staff and naval officers) including one lady naval officer, were lost since the start of the bombing. Prior to the attacks, Naval intelligence was twice alerted by the TTP's attack on Pakistan naval facilities in Karachi.

== Raid ==
The attack took place on the evening of 22 May at around 20:30 (17:30 GMT) when a 15-man TTP force stormed the three hangars housing aircraft at the Mehran naval aviation base. The militants had cut the barbed wire fence at a place on the perimeter fence where they could not be detected by security cameras, and they were wearing black clothes. The militants first attacked the aircraft parked on the tarmac and the equipment in nearby hangars. They used rocket-propelled grenades to damage and destroy several warplanes and premiere anti-submarine and marine surveillance aircraft—the US-made P-3C Orion. Several multimillion-dollar aircraft were set ablaze.

According to Naval Intelligence, the militants entered the naval base from the airfield of Faisal Air Force Base, near Mehran Naval Base. The militants then entered nearby buildings and opened fire indiscriminately, killing several naval personnel, and afterwards carried their raid into the heart of the base. According to the intelligence reports, the militants were not Taliban, judging from their abilities and training.

== Combat ==
Following the attack, the teams of SSG (N) arrived at the scene of shooting from their headquarters. At 05:00, six hours after the assault had begun, the counter-operation started. By the time SSG (N) arrived, the attackers had taken position on the roof of an adjacent two-storey building used by Pakistan Navy for pre- and post-flight briefings and debriefings. Prime Minister Gillani personally monitored this operation, Chairman of the Joint Chiefs of Staff Committee, Chief of Army Staff, Chief of Air Staff, and Chief of Naval Staff stayed in direct contact with Prime Minister Gillani. The core objectives of the mission were issued to SSG (N) teams. The main priority of mission was to recover and evacuate the foreign military advisers from the scene of shooting. The second objective was to either kill or apprehend the militants. The third and final objective was issued by the Naval Intelligence, in which the SSG (N) were instructed to recover the bodies of militants to prevent further mutilation, in order to carry out the investigations. The complex, which the foreign advisers were held in, has a crew room, a lounge, a briefing room and a leisure room and small offices. The gang leader, however, stayed in front of the building, taking a position on the ground. As the teams engaged, the leader went inside the building. A sniper on the rooftop began firing rounds at the SSG (N) teams, taking out men with the help of night-vision equipment. The militant sniper also killed three naval firefighters and two Rangers, who were providing cover for naval firefighters, who were trying to get control of a fire on a P3C-Orion aircraft. The SSG (N) teams quickly targeted the sniper. The sniper was shot in the head and fell on the ground from the top of the complex. According to Naval Intelligence, the militants were only targeting the aircraft and its crew who were unarmed, mostly pilots and officers. The SSG (N) teams provided the cover to the crew in a heavy exchange of fire while the crew took the aircraft to a safe place. The SSG (N) teams had pushed and forced the militants into retaliation, after SSG (N) took aggressive counter measure. The militants ran and hid in a complex near the airport.

It was reported that five Pakistan military personnel were killed and eleven wounded. The dead included one sailor, three firefighters and an Army ranger. The first SSG (N) team, under Lieutenant Abbase, entered the first floor of the complex, where Abbase's team first secured and evacuated the 17 foreign military advisers and technicians who were providing training to the Pakistan Navy's officials. The Navy reported that the SSG (N) teams successfully evacuated 11 PLA Air Force technicians and six USN military advisers, along with securing the other aircraft from further damage. The SSG (N) teams evacuated the foreign advisers from the back of the complex. The Sea King, belonging to No. 111th Naval Squadron of Special Operations Command, took off to an unknown location from the scene carrying the foreign military advisers and other naval officers, including a Rear-Admiral who was reportedly seen engaged with the militants in the complex. During this course, none of the foreign advisers, technicians, hostages, or even the SSG (N) members were killed. After achieving the first core objectives, the SSG (N) teams made a contact with four militants on the first floor who came to learn about the foreign advisers. In a 15-minute-long battle, all of the four militants were disarmed and apprehended by the SSG (N). At 07:00, more than 30 SSG (N) teams entered and penetrated into the base. As the teams progressed, eight heavy explosions were heard inside the base in the space of 30 minutes. At 7:30, the TTP claimed the responsibility of the attack. Reuters quoted the words of Ehsanullah Ehsan (the spokesperson of TTP) by telephone from an undisclosed location, "It was the revenge of martyrdom of Osama bin Laden. It was the proof that we are still united and powerful". At 10:00, the militants took control of the air traffic control tower but had not taken any hostages; the staff had escaped prior to the militants' seizing of the tower. The SSG (N) then entered one by one to take control over the tower, and after a two-hour-long battle, the SSG (N) took control of the tower with five wounded militants in custody. At 12:00, the Navy reported that the death toll of its officers has risen to 12, of which eleven were members of the Navy, one an Army Ranger. At 13:00, when the operation officially ended, 18 sailors were reported to have been killed and 16 others wounded. In all, it took approximately 16 hours to secure the base.

== Responsibility ==
The Tehrik-i-Taliban Pakistan (TTP) publicly claimed the responsibility of the attack. Reuters quoted the words of Ehsanullah Ehsan, the spokesperson of TTP, by telephone from an undisclosed location, "It was the revenge of martyrdom of Osama bin Laden. It was the proof that we are still united and powerful,". Lieutenant-General (retired) Hamid Gul, former director-general of the ISI, rejected the TTP claim. Gul blamed the United States for this incident as Gul told the Channel 4 News that there is absolutely no doubt that this was a US operation. However, Gul did not provide any evidence for his claim. Later Channel 4 News contacted the US Department of State but they did not respond to the request. According to media reports, three of the assailants were Uzbeks, and they were commanded by a Pakistani national.

On 25 May, senior Naval Intelligence officials told The News International that CIA contractors and anti-Pakistan lobbies had used al-Qaeda for carrying out the raid. Officials also asserted that an external force[s] was behind for such attack, and the main objective of such raid was to destroy the P3-C Orion aircraft. Officials at Naval Intelligence also believed that a group of al-Qaeda and TTP had been trained in Afghanistan by an anti-Pakistan force to carry out such operations against the state.

Prior to his disappearance and murder, journalist Syed Saleem Shahzad wrote in the Asia Times Online that al-Qaeda carried out the attack after negotiations with the Navy for the release of officials, suspected of al-Qaeda links, had failed. According to Shahzad, the attackers were all from Ilyas Kashmiri's 313 Brigade of al-Qaeda.

The News International reported in December 2011 that the TTP-associated Punjabi Taliban had been involved in the attack. According to the wife of Qari Faisal, a slain leader of the Punjabi Taliban, the group had provided the militants with food and logistical support. She also claimed that the militants had been of foreign origin.

== Investigation ==
The Naval Intelligence of Pakistan launched a formal investigation into the PNS Mehran attack, with an investigation team which will be headed by a two-star rear admiral, and officials from the Naval Intelligence. According to Interior Ministry officials the investigation team includes officers from Air Intelligence (Pakistan Air Force), FIA, and Army Rangers officers. A senior officer of the Interior Ministry's Crisis Management Cell has said that the PNS Mehran attack has caused Pakistan a loss of 6.47 billion rupees.

GEO News also reported that severe contradictions have emerged following the attack on PNS Mehran. The differences found in the statements of Interior Minister Rehman Malik, Chief of Naval Staff and the FIR lodged by the Navy have complicated the matter. Lieutenant Irfan Asghar (who was on night duty when the base was attacked) reported that 10 to 12 terrorists had attacked the base. According to the Police, proof had been found that four terrorists were involved in the attack and they were carrying suicide jackets and other explosives.

Pakistan media reported on 23 May, that the both Naval Intelligence and Interior Minister Rehman Malik are deeply convinced that there was an internal hand that provided the deep information about the base. Naval Intelligence and Naval Police also apprehended suspects from nearby residential areas. The suspects were held at an unknown location by the Naval Police. On 25 May, the Naval Intelligence launched an investigation on Mehran Naval Base's Officer Commanding Commodore Raja Tahir for failing to increase the security of the base. Commodore Tahir has been suspended from the Navy and is under current investigation by Naval Intelligence. The Navy appointed Commodore Khalid Pervaiz as the Base's new Officer Commanding. Furthermore, the Naval Police are also interrogating four naval officials of the Pakistan Navy from Lahore in suspicion of being linked with TTP. All of these officials, who were arrested in February 2011, were court-martialed by the JAG Branch of the Navy. These members are currently facing a death penalty with a 25 years in row. However, the NI is currently interrogating these former naval officials at Central Military Jail of Rawalpindi. According to the Navy, these four naval officials are non-commissioned officers, and none of them were ever stationed in the Mehran Naval base.

According to the News Intelligence Unit of Jang Media Group, the Naval Intelligence (NI) was warned that such an attack would take place, in January 2011. This was revealed when Naval Police arrested a former member of the Pakistan Marines for suspicious activities and aiding the Taliban militants. The Marine commando also revealed that a plan was already made to carry out the raid on PNS Mehran Naval Base, Pakistan Oil refineries, and the naval weapons engineering directorate of the Pakistan Navy. This was done, since SSG (N) and Navy, had both covertly and overtly participated in Operation Rah-e-Nijat and Operation Black Thunderstorm. According to Naval Intelligence, the arrested marine commando is related to the Mehsud tribe of South Waziristan, a warrior tribe that is leading the Tehrik-i-Taliban Pakistan against the State of Pakistan. However, the Naval Police and PNS Mehran Officer in Command did not take any preventive measures against the intelligence that was provided by the Naval Intelligence.

On 27 May, the Naval Intelligence apprehended the Qari Qaisar, a close confidant of Mohammed Aqeel, a former Pakistan Army medic who was arrested during Operation Janbaz by the Pakistan Army. Simultaneously, Naval Police also apprehended Ahmed Shahzad from Karachi, and Riaz Chaudhry from Lahore. All of these assailants are linked to TTP and provided logistics to the Taliban.

== Consequences ==
=== Nuclear alert ===
Following the attack, Pakistan put its military facilities on high alert. Suspicions also grew in Pakistan about the safety of the country's nuclear assets that may be the Taliban or al-Qaeda's next target. According to the media, Pakistan also tightened the security of its nuclear installations as well as putting them onto high alert. Pakistan's military establishment and civil leadership has been concerned over the attacks on its nuclear facilities, therefore alerting the securities of Pakistan's nuclear assets on a 24-hour alert.

Neighboring India, where the situation was closely monitored, quickly responded by deploying its naval forces to protect its naval bases, particularly the Mumbai naval base. Jang also reported that India has been concerned with the wave of terror incidents in Pakistan and has also put its military on high alert. Indian President Pratibha Patil and Prime Minister Manmohan Singh chaired a meeting. Following the meeting, the Prime Minister ordered the tightening of security of Indian nuclear facilities and installations while the Indian Army and the Nuclear Command Authority continued to stay on high alert.

NATO also admitted its concern over the Taliban's ability to target the Pakistan's nuclear installations. Secretary-General Rasmussen expressed concerns over the attack on Pakistan's nuclear facilities, but it also showed his confidence that the nuclear weapons and facilities are well protected.

== Reaction ==
=== Domestic ===
- Pakistan – Prime Minister Gillani, who monitored the operation, condemned the raid and vowed Pakistan would continue to fight against the terror. Gillani also asserted that, there was a need to enhance security measures in the fight against what he termed terrorism. Media reports indicated that Gillani had ordered Pakistan's Armed Forces to upgrade their security measures and take precautionary steps to avoid such incidents in the future.
  - Altaf Hussain, President of the MQM, criticised the Pakistani Navy for failing to protect its assets. He condemned the attack saying that the penetration of a sensitive military site is a matter of concern for the whole country. He said the attack was an "open defeat" for Pakistan's Armed Forces.
  - Chief Minister of Punjab Province Shahbaz Sharif also condemned the attack, though he criticised the navy for not acting more quickly to protect its billion-dollar assets. He told the media at Iqbal International Airport that Pakistan has become a laughing stock in the world for not protecting and fighting the war on terror with any determination.
  - Nawaz Sharif said the incident was not an ordinary act of terrorism and added that the roots of Pakistan were being shattered through terrorism. He also called for a probe into the attack in what he said was the responsibility of anti-Pakistan forces, something his Pakistan Muslim League (Nawaz) would not remain silent about as the "Karachi incident should open our eyes." He further added that such incidents were damaging the image of Pakistan to the world. He vowed to eliminate "terrorism" from the country.
  - Nisar Ali Khan, leader of the opposition in the National Assembly of Pakistan, also called the breach of PNS Mehran a massive security negligence and called for summoning an open meeting of the joint parliamentary standing committee whereby the people responsible for the lapse be identified. Khan also criticised the Chief of Naval Staff Admiral Noman Bashir. During a session of parliament, Nisar said that according to Bashir the incident was not result of a security lapse asking: "Can [Admiral Bashir] describe what constitutes a security lapse?"

Media

GEO Television Director of News Intelligence Unit (NIU) Kamran Khan also criticised the Navy for not conducting proper investigations on previous attacks. Khan said that the Naval Intelligence unit had failed to investigate the assailants behind the previous attacks, and therefore no security measures had been undertaken to protect its multibillion-dollar assets.

=== International ===
- People's Republic of China – China supported Pakistan's role in the war on terror. It also praised the SSG (N) for protecting and evacuating of its officers from the course of the attack; while it also rejected claims that militants had held Chinese officials as hostages, though none of its officials were injured or killed.
- India – The government of India expressed concern over wave of terror attacks in Pakistan. Defence Minister A. K. Antony termed PNS Mehran attack a matter of serious concern for India. According to Antony, the developments in Pakistan, especially in Karachi, were a matter of serious concern. Defence Minister also said: "We are closely monitoring and we are taking precautions also. But at the same time, we don t want to overreact."
- United Kingdom – Prime Minister David Cameron said that NATO allies must work with Pakistan more closely than ever, not turn away. Cameron also said, Their (Pakistani) enemy is our enemy.
- United States of America – President Barack Obama said that the Taliban are the enemies of Pakistan. US Secretary of State Hillary Clinton condemned the terror attack.

== Aftermath ==
Soon after the attack, Pakistani media began to air news that an Army SSG Division was going to carry out the operation. This was contradicted by Commodore Irfanul Haque, spokesperson of Naval Inter Services Public Relations. Commodore Haque confirmed that the SSG (N) are the one who are carrying out the operation. The Prime Minister Secretariat also confirmed the Commodore's statement, and said, Prime Minister Gillani is monitoring this operation. During the entire operation, the Naval SSG or SSG (N) exercised complete command, while the Army and Rangers stayed behind the SSG (N) back cordon. Pakistan Army's SSG Division also arrived in the course of the shooting and was ready to conduct an operation. However, SSG (N) arrived at the base earlier than the Army's SSG and had been monitoring and planning an operation before the Army took over. Judging from SSG (N)'s ability to conduct operation, Prime Minister Gillani gave a green signal and go-ahead to SSG (N) to conduct the operation, and monitored the operation from Islamabad. Overall, during the operation, the SSG (N) lost three men who were shot by the ring-leader, prior to starting of the operation. Casualties for Pakistan Marines stood at four men while one Ranger was also killed. No Pakistan Army SSG personnel took participation in the operation. The Marines and Army Rangers kept guard at the perimeter of the Naval Base.
