= 333 Squadron PN =

333 ASW Squadron
- ۳۳۳ سکواڈرن
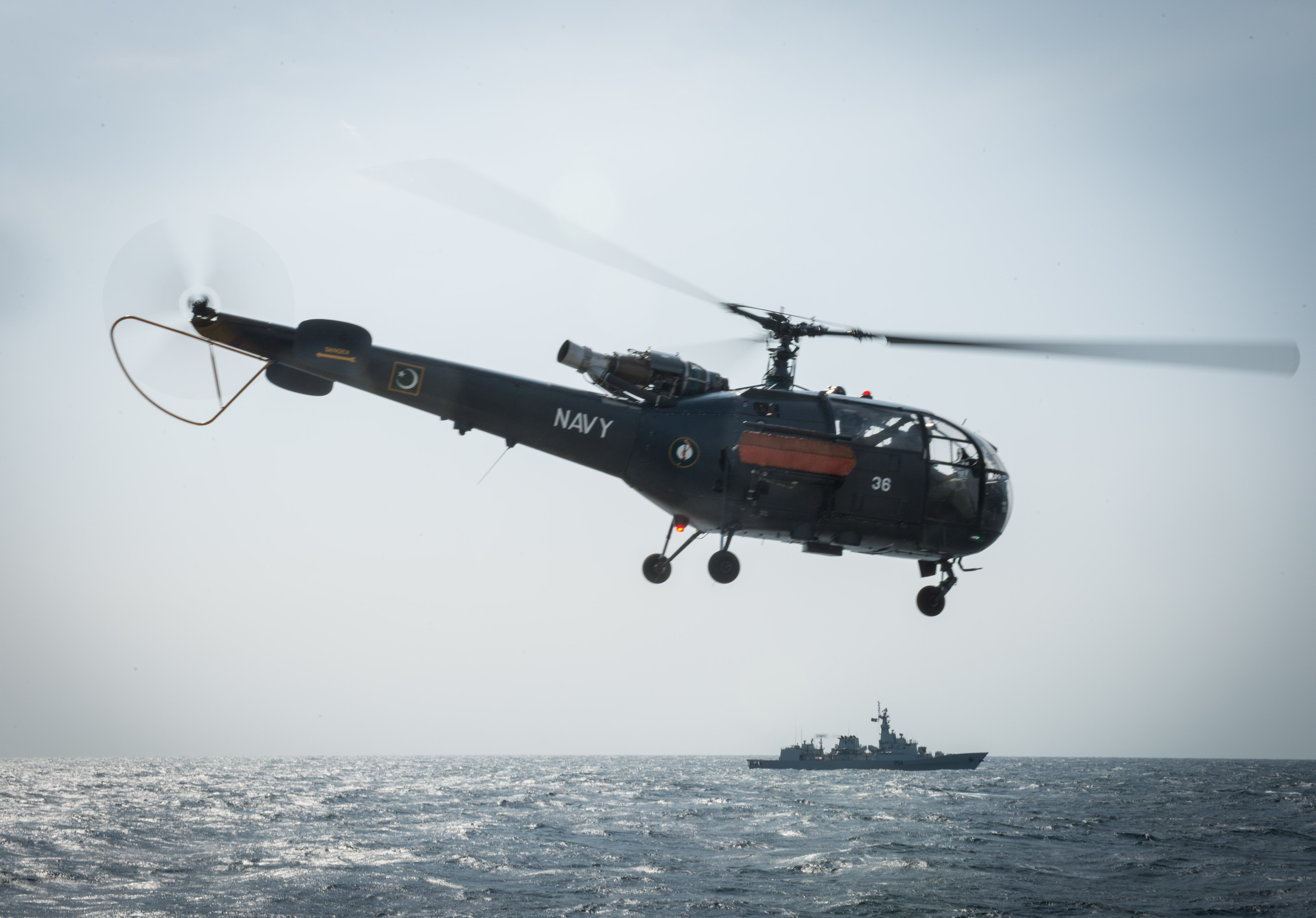
- An Alouette III of the 333 Squadron during a multi-national naval exercise in 2014.
- Active: Since 1970 (56 years, 9 months)
- Country: Pakistan
- Allegiance: Pakistan Navy
- Branch: Pakistan Naval Air Arm
- Type: Squadron
- Role: ASW and Utility
- Station: PNS Mehran
- Nickname: Seagulls
- Mascot: A Seagull
- Anniversaries: 8 September (Navy day)
- Helicopters: Aérospatiale Alouette III

The 333 Squadron also known by its nickname the Seagulls is a helicopter squadron of the Pakistan Naval Air Arm which operates Aérospatiale Alouette III helicopters stationed at PNS Mehran. With its helicopters deployed aboard various ships of the Pakistan Navy, the squadron is assigned with anti-submarine warfare role while also conducting secondary duties ranging from SAR to MEDEVAC.

== History ==
The squadron was established in 1970 when Pakistan started talks with the UK for two Whitby-class frigates for which Aérospatiale was to provide four SA-316s. While the deal for the Whitby class frigates was scrapped, Pakistan still went ahead with the acquisition of SA-319s for which 4 pilots were sent to France for training on the chopper. The helicopters were inducted in the Pakistan Naval Air Arm in 1977 which marked the official raising of the 333 squadron.

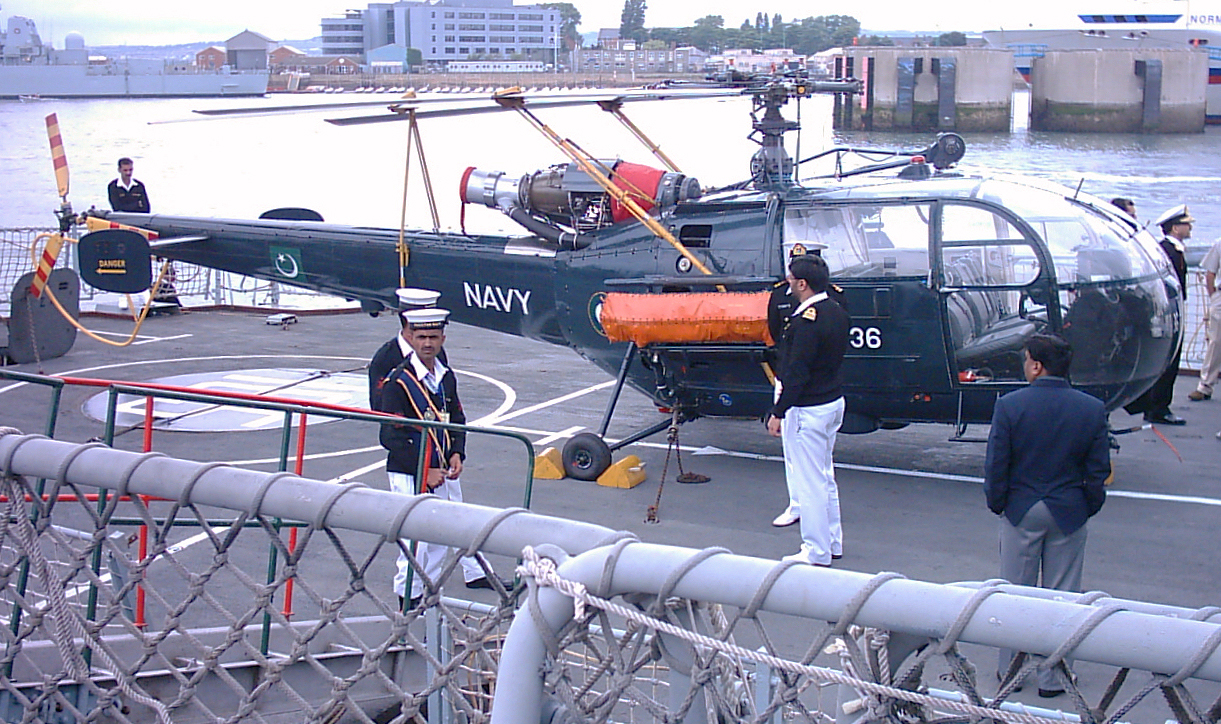
Alouette III of the 333 squadron aboard PNS Tippu Sultan at the International Festival of the Sea in 2005, Portsmouth, UK

The squadron's fleet continued to expand with two radar fitted Alouette-IIIs inducted in 1982 and two more Ex-French SA-319Bs with upgraded flight controls and avionics inducted in 2008. The helicopters of the squadron have been modified to fire Mk. 46 light torpedoes to enable them to conduct anti-submarine warfare.

=== Operational history ===
The squadron has taken part in multiple naval operations and exercises throughout the years. In 2017, an Allouettte-III of the squadron undertook a MEDEVAC operation in which a seriously ill Pakistan Navy sailor aboard PNS Tariq was airlifted to USNS Amelia Earhart from where he was shifted to USS Makin Island for further treatment.

==== Exercises ====
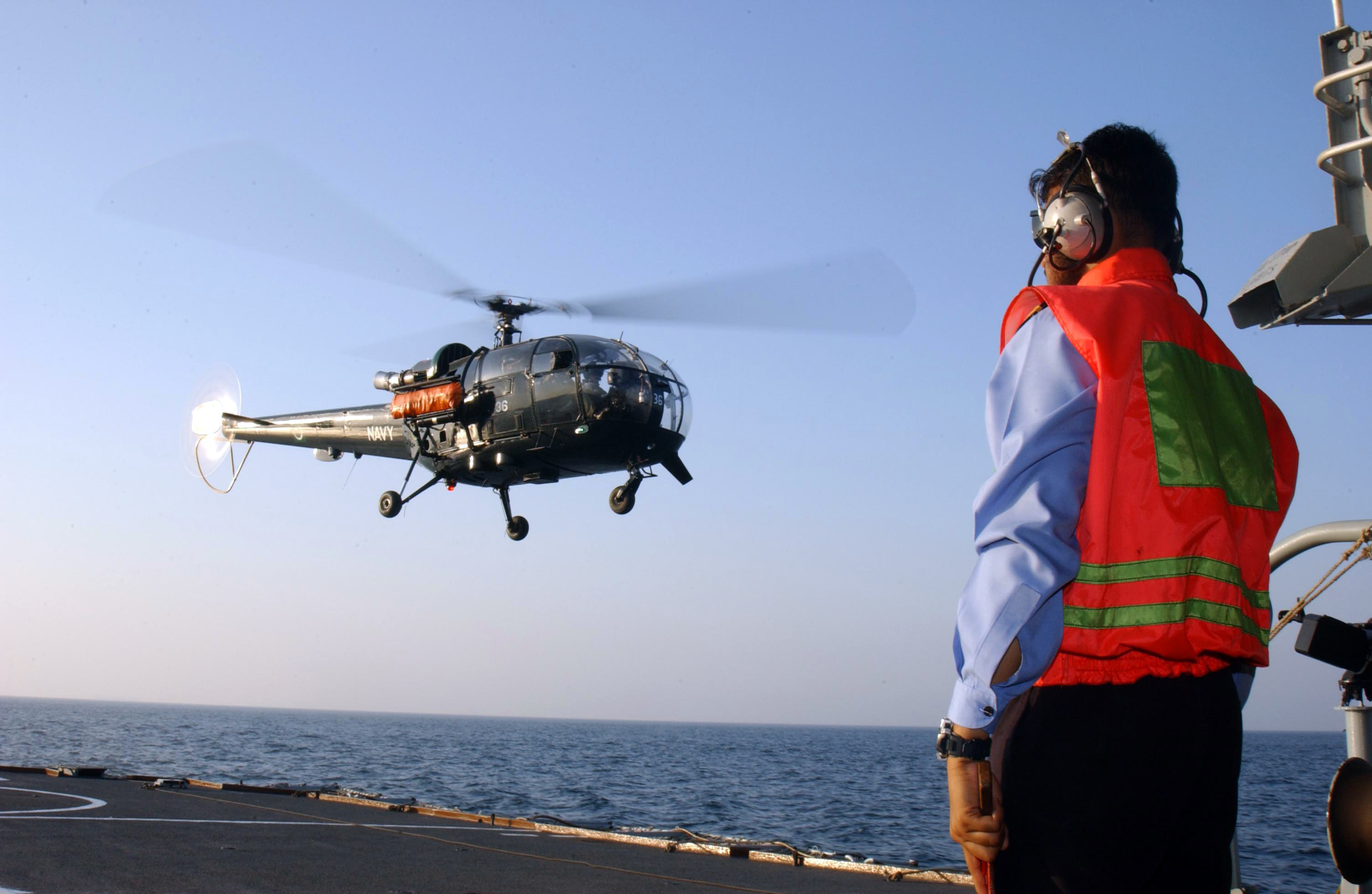
Allouette-III of the squadron takes off from PNS Babur during a naval exercise in the Persian Gulf in 2004.

- In 2004, Allouette-III of the squadron aboard PNS Babur took part in a coalition naval exercise in the Persian Gulf.

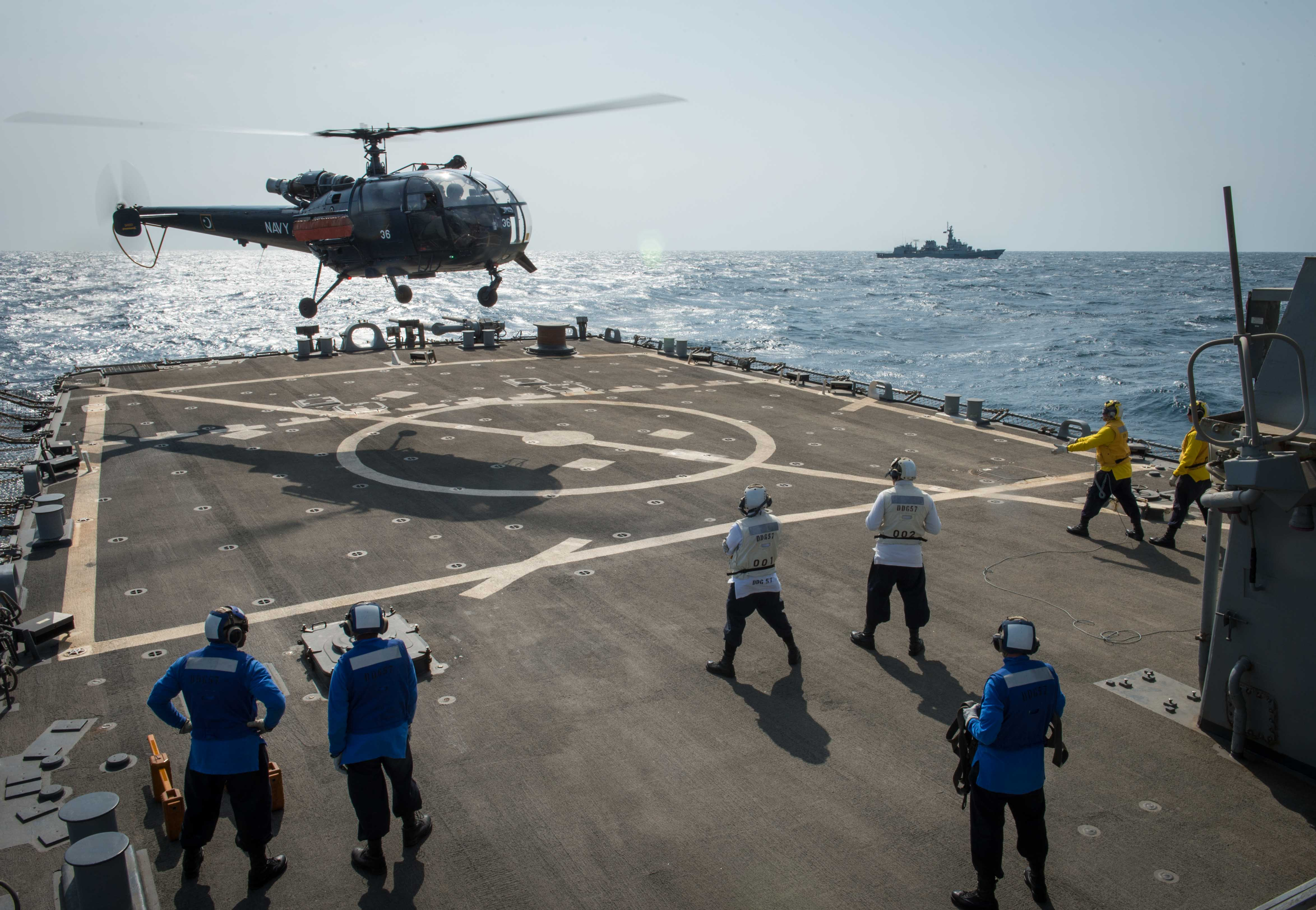

- 2014 International Mine Countermeasures Exercise (IMCE) aboard PNS Aslat

== See also ==
- 222 Squadron PN
