= Pakistan Naval Air Arm =

Military Unit

- Insignia of the Pakistan Naval Air Arm
- Founded: 9 December 1971; 54 years ago
- Country: Pakistan
- Branch: Pakistan Navy
- Type: Naval aviation and Combat service support
- Role: Administrative and staffing oversight.
- Size: 5,000 personnel, 85 aircraft
- HQ/Garrison: PNS Mehran in Karachi, Sindh, Pakistan
- Nickname: Air Arm
- Mottos: Aviate, Navigate, Communicate
- Colors: Blue and White
- Anniversaries: Navy Day: 8 September
- Engagements: See list: Indo-Pakistani War of 1971 Indo-Pakistani War of 1999; Atlantique incident in 1999 Indo-Pakistani wars and conflicts; Indo-Pakistani standoff in 2001; Indo-Pakistani standoff in 2008; Indo-Pakistan skirmishes in 2016 2004 Indian Ocean tsunami War on terror; War in Afghanistan (2001–present); OEF – Horn of Africa; War in North-West Pakistan; 2010 Pakistan Floods; Operation Madad; Pakistan Armed Forces deployments in Saudi Arabia Afghanistan–Pakistan clashes (2024–present)
- Website: Website

Commanders
- Commander Naval Aviation (COMNAV): Cdre Faheem Abbasi

Insignia
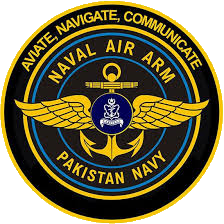
- Patch

- Roundel

- Fin Flash

Aircraft flown
- Helicopter: Harbin Z-9, Alouette III, Westland Sea King
- Patrol: P-3C Orion, ATR P-72 ASW, Embraer Lineage
- Reconnaissance: GIDS Uqab, Hawker 850XL, EMT Luna X-2000

The Pakistan Naval Air Arm (unofficially: Pakistan Naval Aviation) is the naval aviation and military administrative branch of the Pakistan Navy.

The air arm is tasked with providing configuration of all naval aviation aircraft and is responsible for conducting the land-based strike capability, fleet air defense, evacuation and extraction, search and rescue, maritime reconnaissance, and anti-submarine warfare.

The Commander Naval Aviation (COMNAV) command is usually held by a one-star ranking officer at Commodore rank who directs the field operations of the naval aviation.

== History ==
=== Establishment ===
After the second war with India in 1965, the concept of establishing the navy-based aviation service was conceived by the Pakistan Navy who forwarded the idea to the Government of Pakistan as part of the war strategy to sustain the purely defence of nation's maritime interests.

The Navy had been long aware of the usefulness and tactical advantages of the air-wing after witnessing the United States Naval Aviators' actions in the Vietnam War, and V-Adm. Muzaffar Hassan, the Navy Commander, had made attempts to establish naval aviation but this was impossible to achieve in the absence of generous support from outside sources.

Furthermore, strong objections came from Air Marshal Abdur Rahim Khan, the Air Commander, who had been very hostile towards any idea of modernizing the navy and loath to risk its precious aircraft in over-the-water operations. The lack of funds and donations from the United States Navy meant the concept never materialized though the Navy entered into talks with the United States Government to effect the transferring of three to four Lockheed P-3 Orion aircraft before the third war with India in 1971.

After the first missile attack in Karachi in 1971, the Navy hastily established the naval air arm by leasing a civilian aircraft, the Fokker F27, from the Pakistan International Airlines whose pilots volunteered to carry the naval observers on a maritime reconnaissance on 6 December 1971. Cdre. A. W. Bhomba, the senior forward observer, mistakenly identified his own ship, PNS Zulfiqar forming defences at that time, and gave clearance to the Pakistan Air Force to carry out a bombing mission to target the ship – a friendly fire incident that further hampered Navy's operational scope.

After the third war with India in 1971, the Air Arm continued and was able to induct Sea King helicopters from the United Kingdom through transfers from the Royal Navy on 28 September 1974– leading to the establishment of the 111 ASW Squadron in the Naval Aviation. The first naval air station, PNS Mehran, was inaugurated in Karachi, in the vicinity of the Faisal Air Force Base, on 26 September 1975.

Early in its inception the Naval Air Arm was dependent upon the Air Force and the Army to meet its training requirement of air and ground crew.

=== Atlantique Incident ===
The Atlantique Incident was a major international incident that occurred on 10 August 1999 when a Pakistan Naval Air Arm patrol aircraft—a Breguet Atlantique with 16 personnel on board—was shot down in the border area of the Kutch region by Indian Air Force jets. Pakistan and India both claimed the aircraft to be in their respective airspace.

Some experts stated that the Atlantique was probably conducting a "probe" on India's air defence system, mainly the radar equipment in the border area; however, they advised that it was not part of any planned aggressive military action by Pakistan. Foreign diplomats who visited the crash site noted that the plane "may have strayed into restricted space", and that Islamabad was unable to explain why it was flying so close to the border; they however added that India's reaction to the incident was not justified. Many countries, the G8, the permanent members of the UN Security Council, as well as the western media questioned the wisdom behind Pakistan's decision to fly military aircraft so close to the Indian border.

On 21 September 1999, Pakistan lodged a compensation claim at the International Court of Justice (ICJ) in The Hague, accusing India of shooting down an unarmed aircraft. Pakistan sought about US$60 million in reparations from India and compensation for the victims' families. India's attorney general, Soli Sorabjee, argued that the court did not have jurisdiction, citing an exemption it filed in 1974 to exclude disputes between India and other Commonwealth States, and disputes covered by multi-lateral treaties.

On 21 June 2000, the 16-judge Bench headed by Gilbert Guillaume of France ruled—with a 14–2 verdict—upholding India's submission that the court had no jurisdiction in this matter. Pakistan's claims were dropped, without recourse to appeal, and the outcome was seen as a decision highly favorable to India. The Pakistan government had spent close to 25 million Pakistani rupees (approx. $400,000) on the case.

=== PNS Mehran Attack ===
On 22 May 2011, Tehreek-i-Taliban militants attacked PNS Mehran air station and killed 18 Navy Personnel while 16 were injured. 2 P-3C Orion aircraft were also destroyed in the attack.

== Organization ==
=== Squadrons ===
==== Rotary-wing ====
- 111 Squadron (ASW, ASuW, SAR)

Established on 17 January 1982, the 111 ASW Squadron, which consists of the Sea King helicopters, is primarily programmed for missile launch capability targeting dived submarines and releasing depth charges.

- 222 Squadron (ASW)

With the acquisition of Tariq-class destroyers from the Royal Navy, the Navy was additionally able to acquire three Westland Lynx utility helicopters which were inducted into the 222 ASW Squadron. They were later retired in 2003.

In 2006, the Navy re-equipped the 222 ASW squadron by introducing the Harbin Z-9 helicopters which are equipped with sensors and radars to support the F-22P class frigates.

- 333 Squadron (ASW)

In 1977, the 333 ASW squadron was established with the induction of the Aérospatiale Alouette II and the Alouette III rotary aircraft, for which the first group of naval aviators were trained in France.

==== Fixed-wing ====
- 27 Squadron (ASW)

In 1982, the 27 ASW Squadron was established with the induction of the Fokker F-27 aircraft. All of its Fokker F-27 aircraft were retired on 21 January 2020 in an impressive phasing out ceremony.

- 28 ASW Squadron (ASW, ASuW)

28 ASW squadron was formed by the acquisition of P-3C Orion aircraft in 1996 after a long delay due to the imposition of the Pressler Amendment in 1990. The P-3C Orion gave the Navy strike capability but one of these planes was lost due to an accident while carrying out routine exercises in local coastal waters on 29 October 1999.

- 29 ASW Squadron (ASW, EW)

In 1973, the Navy entered into talks with France to acquire the Breguet Atlantic aircraft for its patrolling missions, and acquired them on 14 August 1976, that established the 29 ASW Atlantic Squadron and is tasked with maritime reconnaissance missions. A single Hawker 850XP was also inducted in Aug 2010 for IW/EW.

After the retirement of the Breguet Atlantic aircraft from service the squadron has been re-equipped with ATR-72 turboprop airliners upgraded into two variants, the RAS-72 Sea Eagle for Maritime Patrol / ASW and other variant being utilized in transport role.

- 47 UAV Squadron (ISR)

47 UAV squadron consists of GIDS Uqab UAVs used for Intelligence, Surveillance and Reconnaissance (ISR).

=== Naval Air Stations ===
- Pakistan Naval Air Station PNS Mehran, Karachi
- Pakistan Naval Air Station PNS Makran, Pasni
- Naval Air Station PNS Siddique, Turbat
- Naval Air Station PNS Ahsan, Ormara

== Gallery ==
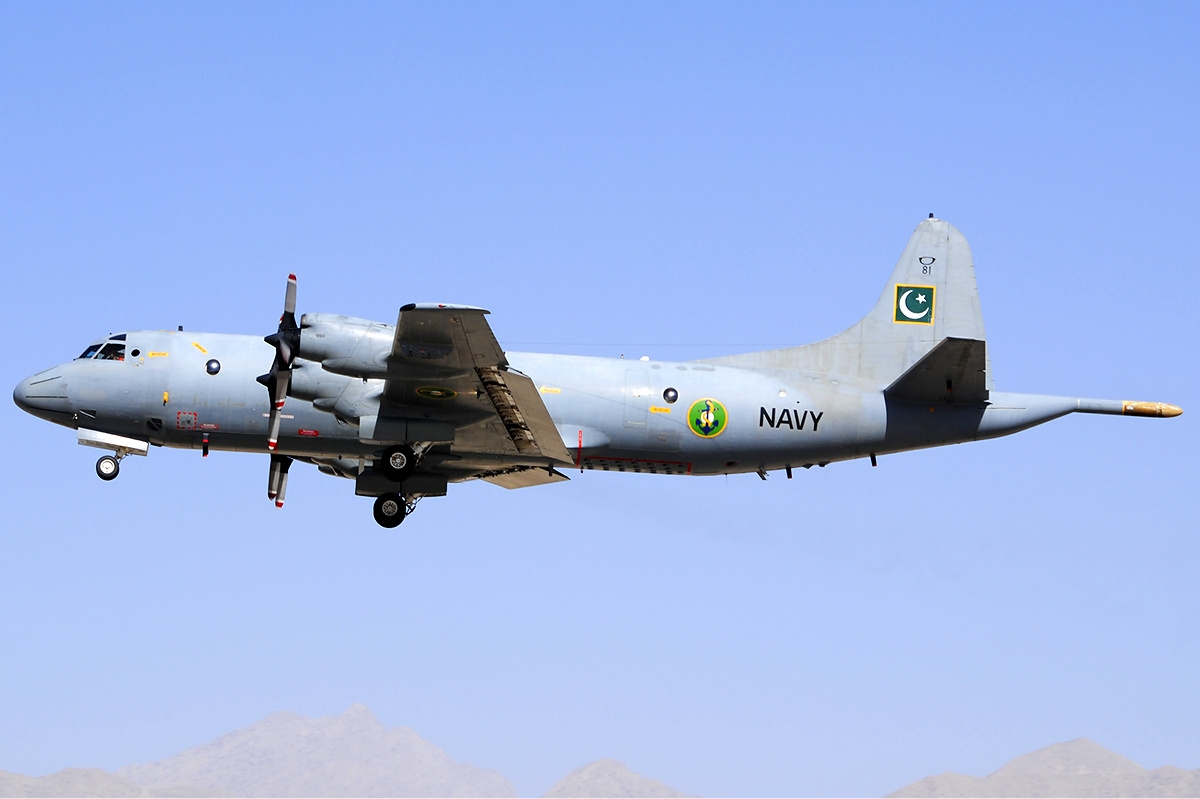
A Pakistan Navy Orion on takeoff

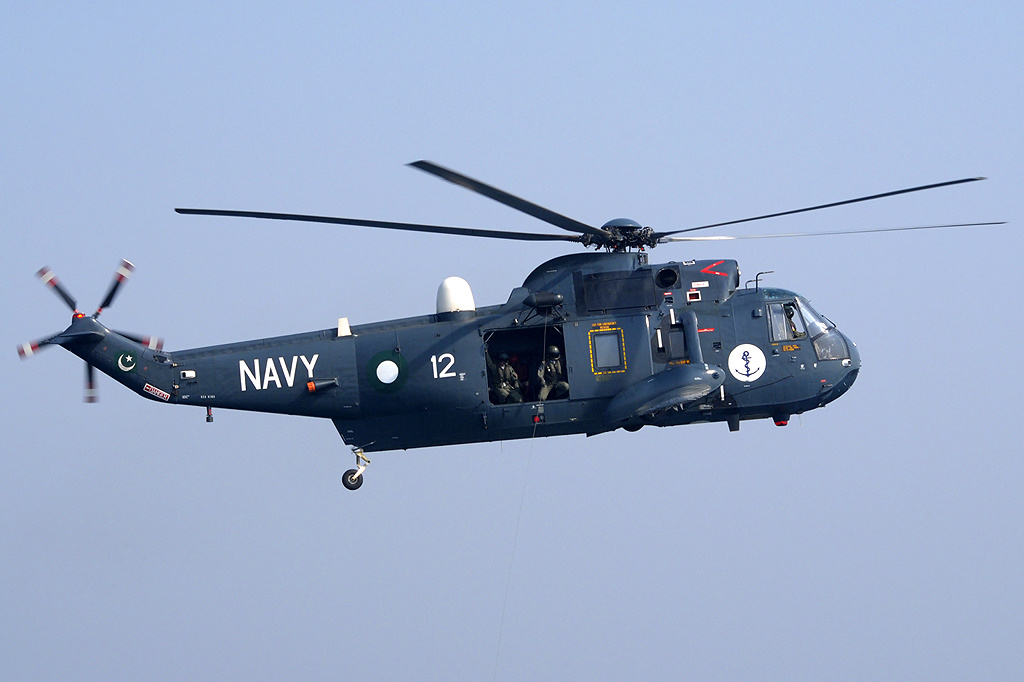
A Pakistani Westland Sea King

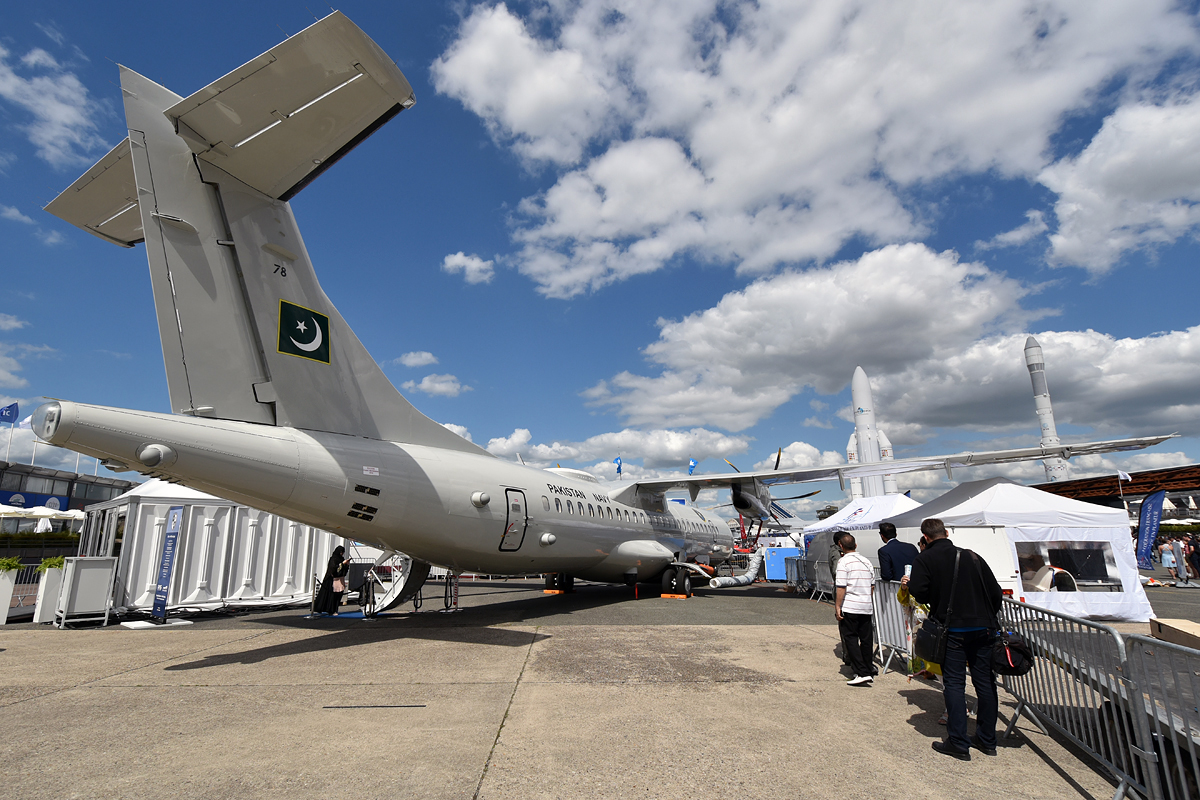
ATR 72-500MPA of Pakistan Navy

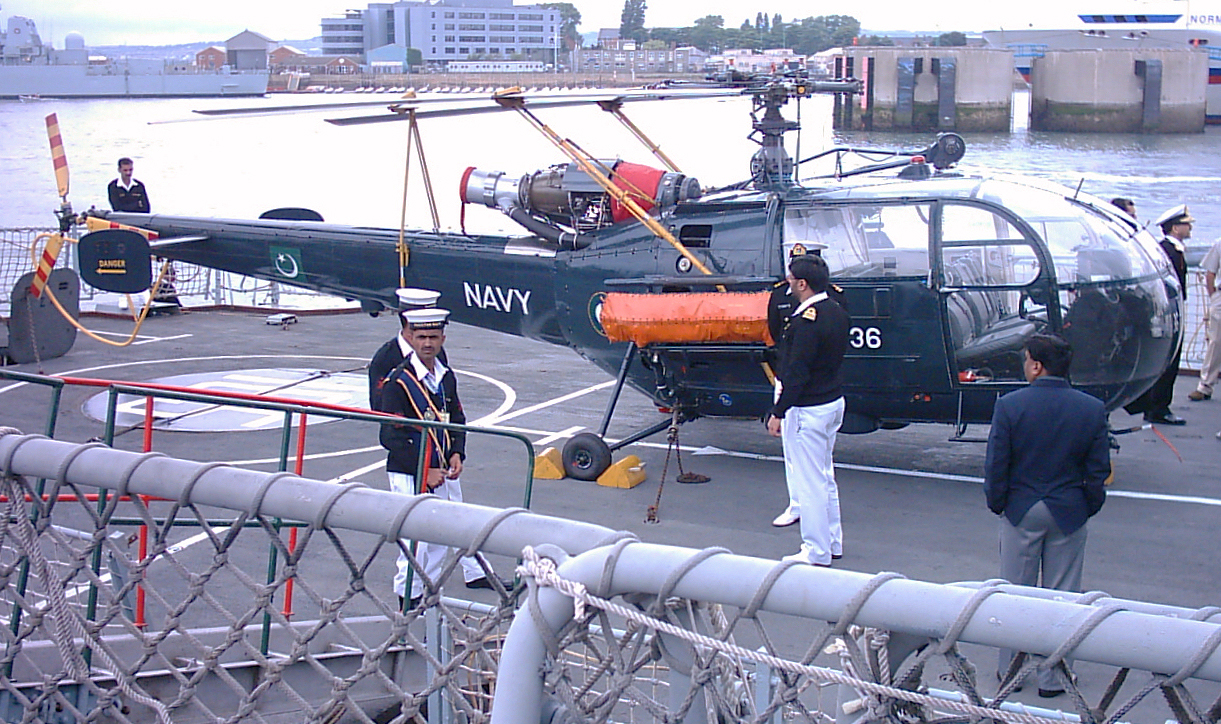
Pakistan Naval Air Arm Alouette III No 36 aboard PNS Tippu Sultan (D185) at the International Festival of the Sea 2005, Portsmouth, UK

== See also ==
- Pakistan Army Aviation Corps
- List of active Pakistan Navy ships
