= Navy Day (Pakistan) =

- Official name: یومِ بحریہ
- Observed by: Pakistan
- Type: National
- Celebrations: Ceremonies at naval bases around Pakistan.
- Date: 8 September
- Next time: 8 September 2027
- Frequency: annual

Navy Day (Urdu: یوم بحریہ), is a holiday in Pakistan which commemorates the execution of Operation Somnath by the navy's 25th Destroyer Squadron during the 1965 Indo-Pakistan war. The day honors the sailors in units of the Pakistan Navy and its specialized arms (Naval Aviation, Marines and SSG(N)). It is celebrated annually, on 8th September.

== History ==
Pakistan Navy observes Navy Day on 8 September to commemorate the implementation of Operation Somnath, an operation carried out by the 25th squadron. This operation holds historical significance as it showcased the effectiveness of the Pakistan Navy in countering a significant opponent.

== Observance ==
The national leadership and the ranks of the Pakistan Navy usually congratulate sailors on this professional holiday. The Chief of Naval Staff commemorates the day with a religious prayer at Shuhada Monument in the Naval Headquarters while various key commanders (including COMKAR, COMPAK etc.) visit the families of the fallen sailors.

== See also ==
- Public holidays in Pakistan
- Navy Day (Ukraine)
- Navy Day (Russia)
