= PNS Makran =

Naval air station in Balochistan, Pakistan

- Badge of the Pakistan Navy
- IATA: none; ICAO: none

Summary
- Airport type: Military: Naval Air Station
- Owner: Ministry of Defence
- Operator: Pakistan Navy
- Serves: Pasni
- Location: Pasni, Balochistan, Pakistan
- In use: 1988–present
- Occupants: Naval Air Arm
- Coordinates: 25°17′28″N 63°20′41″E
- Website: PNS Makran
- Interactive map of PNS Makran

Pakistan Navy Station Makran (reporting name: PNS Makran; formerly Coastal Naval Air Station, Pasni) is a naval air station and military airport located in the coastal city of Pasni, Balochistan, Pakistan. It is one of four active Naval Air Arm bases operated by the Pakistan Navy in Balochistan.

== History ==
Construction at the site began in 1986, with a temporary runway completed in 1988. The construction was undertaken by the Corps of Engineers, the Military Engineering Service, and the Naval Engineering Branch of the Pakistan Navy. Previously designated the Coastal Naval Air Station (CNAS), the facility initially housed the Navy's Naval Observer School, followed by the Naval Search and Rescue Squadron.

On 23 October 1988, Chief of Naval Staff Admiral Iftikhar Ahmed Sirohey, who later served as Chairman of the Joint Chiefs of Staff Committee, visited the station.

In 2003, the base was connected to Makran Coastal Highway (National Highway 10), which connects Karachi to Gwadar near the Iran–Pakistan border.

== Current operations ==
PNS Makran supports naval air operations and maritime reconnaissance in Balochistan. Aircraft deployed from PNS Mehran have operated from the station in support of humanitarian relief operations in the region.

== See also ==
- Pakistan Naval Air Arm
