= PNS Mehran =

Pakistan Navy's naval air station in Karachi, Sindh

PNS Mehran
- پی این ایس مہران
- Karachi, Sindh Province in Pakistan

Site information
- Type: Naval Air Station
- Owner: Pakistan Navy
- Condition: Operational
- Website: Pakistan Navy

Location

Site history
- Built: 1970
- Built for: Naval Air Arm
- Built by: Pakistan
- In use: Since 26 September 1975
- Battles/wars: War on terror; Insurgency in Khyber Pakhtunkhwa
- Events: 2011 PNS Mehran attack

Garrison information
- Occupants: 29 Squadron; 111 Squadron "Sharks"; 222 Squadron "Stingrays"; 333 Squadron "Sea Gulls"

The Pakistan Navy Station Mehran, commonly known as the PNS Mehran, is a naval air station that is the headquarters of the Pakistan Navy's air arm located in Karachi, Sindh, Pakistan.

Established in 1975, the naval base shares its jurisdiction with the PAF Base Faisal of the Pakistan Air Force and the Faisal Cantonment of the Pakistan Army. In addition, the PNS Mehran is also the distinguished itself as the "Naval Aviation Training School (NATS)" that provides education and training to navy's personnel to be qualified as naval aviators.

== History ==
On 13 September 1975, the senior fleet commander released commissioning orders of the PNS Mehran with the project delegated to Pakistan Army Corps of Engineers and the Military Engineering Services (MES) build the base and its support facilities. Constructed on an accelerated schedule, the command post of the PNS Mehran was completed on the 25 September 1975 which allowed the commissioning of the PNS Mehran on 26 September 1975. The Pakistan Naval Air Arm is roughly modeled on the British Fleet Air Arm with British Sea King from the Royal Navy joining the service with the Pakistan Navy.

The PNS Mehran saw its first commanding officer, Captain Fazl Rab (PN No. 456) in 1975, and was the first naval air station in the country.

Since 1990, the PNS Mehran scope has been expanded and was the first aviation base that had attained the night operational aerial capabilities. The PNS Mehran was also the site of the targeted terrorist incident when it was attacked by the TTP. The attack was widely seen as a repercussion for the U.S. Navy operation that killed Osama bin Laden.

The PNS Mehran is the headquarters of the Pakistan Navy's Air Arm whereas the Commander Naval Aviation (COMNAV) also commands and report the unit from the PNS Mehran.

=== Naval Aviation Training School ===
The Naval Aviation Training School (NATS) is located in the premises of the PNS Mehran that provides education, training, qualifications, and certifications to the navy's personnel to be passed out as "naval aviators." The School is commanded by the Officer Commanding Naval Aviation Training School (OC NATS).

The school is mandated to train surface fleet officers and the enlisted personnel to meet the various requirements of shipborne flight operations, specifically the rotary-wing aircraft. The School also conducts joint training with the Pakistan Air Force to provide certification to its personnel to earned their pins after completing and passing out from the Air Navigators Course.
