= List of active Pakistan Navy vessels =

Naval Flag of the Pakistan Navy

Below is a list of vessels (ships, submarines, and other watercraft) currently in active service with the Pakistan Navy.

== Submarine fleet ==
=== Conventional Attack Submarines ===
Class	Picture	Type	Quantity	Origin	Boat	Displacement	Note
Total Submarine Active (9)
Active (6)
Hangor class		Attack submarine	1	China; Pakistan	PNS Hangor	2,800 tons	1 commissioned in 2026, 7 on order.
Agosta-90B class		Attack submarine	3	France; Pakistan	PNS Khalid (S137) PNS Saad (S138) PNS Hamza (S139)	2,050 tons	Equipped with the French MESMA air independent propulsion (AIP) system. First submarine built at DCN in France while other two built at Karachi Shipyard and Engineering Works (KSEW) in Karachi, Pakistan under a transfer of technology agreement. All three Agosta-90Bs upgraded by Turkey's STM: PNS/M Hamza upgraded and delivered in 2021. PNS/M Khalid upgraded and delivered in December 2022.
Agosta-70 class		Attack submarine	2	France	PNS Hashmat (S135) PNS Hurmat (S136)	1,760 tons	Originally intended to be sold to South Africa, but sold to Pakistan after embargo on South Africa.
On Order (7)
Hangor class		Attack submarine	7	China; Pakistan	PNS Shushuk PNS Mangro PNS Ghazi PNS Tasnim PNS Seem Maai PNS (?) PNS (?)	2,800 tons	8 submarines on order, of which 3 have already been built and launched, and 1 (PNS Hangor) commissioned. First 4 being built in China by the China Shipbuilding Trading Company (CSOC) and last 4 being built in Pakistan by KSEW with technology transfer. First 4 submarines expected to be delivered by 2026, while last 4 expected to be delivered by 2028.

=== Midget submarines ===
Class	Picture	Type	Quantity	Origin	Displacement	Note
Active (3)
Cosmos class		Shallow water midget submarine	3	Italy; Pakistan	110 tons	Mini-submarines designed by Italian firm COSMOS in 1986 and built in Pakistan by KSEW under a transfer of technology agreement.

== Surface fleet ==
=== Frigates ===
Class	Picture	Type	Quantity	Origin	Ship	Displacement	Note
Active (9)
Tughril class		Multirole Guided Missile & Air Defence Frigate	4	China	PNS Tughril (F261) PNS Taimur (F262) PNS Tippu Sultan (F263) PNS Shah Jahan (F264)	4,200 tons	First two ships commissioned in 2022 and two commissioned in 2023.
Zulfiquar class		Multirole Guided Missile Frigate	4	China; Pakistan	PNS Zulfiquar (F251) PNS Shamsheer (F252) PNS Saif (F253) PNS Aslat (F254)	3,144 tons	F-22Ps based on updated Type 053H3 frigates. Design is also influenced from Type 054. The F-22P's hull contains Type 054 frigate's radar cross-section reduction. First three ships were constructed in China and the fourth ship was built in Pakistan by KSEW with transfer of technology.
Oliver Hazard Perry class		Guided Missile Frigate	1	United States	PNS Alamgir (F260)	4,200 tons	
Under Development
Jinnah class		Multirole Frigate	1	Pakistan	PNS Jinnah (F265)	3,300	The Jinnah class is Pakistan's first locally designed and built frigate. It was designed by the Pakistan Navy's Platform Design Wing (PDW), and a contract has been signed with KSEW to launch the first ship by 2028. Total 6-8 ships planned.

=== Corvettes ===
Class	Picture	Type	Origin	Quantity	Ship	Displacement	Notes
Active (6)
Babur class		Multirole Corvette	Turkey	2	PNS Babur (F280) PNS Khaibar （F282）	3,000 tons	Based on Turkish MILGEM-class corvette. PNS Babur commissioned on 6 September 2024. PNS Khaiber handed over to the Pakistan Navy on 20 December 2025.
Yarmook class		Multirole Corvette	Netherlands; Romania	4	PNS Yarmook (F271) PNS Tabuk (F272) PNS Hunain (F273) PNS Yamama (F274)	2,300 tons (batch-I) 2,600 tons (batch-II)	Dutch shipbuilder Damen built PNS Yarmook was commissioned in February 2020. PNS Tabuk was commissioned on 12 November 2020. Batch-II ships are based on Damen OPV 2600. These ships are armed with AShM and anti-air systems. PNS Hunain was commissioned on 26 July 2024 while PNS Yamama was commissioned on 17 December 2024.
On Order (2)
Babur class		Multirole Corvette	Turkey; Pakistan	2	PNS Badr（F281 PNS Tariq（F283）	3,000 tons	Based on Turkish MILGEM-class corvette. PNS Badr and PNS Tariq have been launched and are undergoing outfitting and sea trials. The PNS Badr is expected to be delivered by June 2026, while the PNS Tariq will be delivered in the first quarter of 2027.

=== Fast attack craft & Missile boats ===
Class	Picture	Type	Quantity	Origin	Ship	Displacement	Note
Active (8)
Azmat class		Missile Bearing Fast attack craft	4	China; Pakistan	PNS Azmat (P-1013); PNS Dehshat (P-1014); PNS Himmat (P-1027); PNS Haibat (P-1028)	560 tons	Armed with AShM and anti-air systems. The first ship was built at Xingang Shipyard in China. Rest were built under the Transfer of Technology agreement in Pakistan at Karachi Shipyard.
Jalalat class		Missile boat	2	Pakistan	PNS Jalalat (P-1029); PNS Shujaat (P-1030)	250 tons	
Jurrat class		Missile boat	2	Pakistan; Thailand	PNS Jurrat (P-1023); PNS Quwwat (P-1028)	250 tons	Commissioned in 2006, Thai designed Marsun M39 Fast Patrol Boat built under ToT at Karachi Shipyard.

=== Fast patrol boats / High speed boats ===
Class	Picture	Type	Quantity	Origin	Ship	Displacement	Note
Active (64)
Marine Assault Boats (MAB)		Fast patrol boat	20	Pakistan; Poland		12 tons	In June 2019, Pakistan Navy received first two MABs from Polish shipbuilder, Techno Marine under the Transfer of Technology agreement. Remaining MABs are built in Pakistan.
MRTP-33/35		Fast patrol boat	2	Turkey	PNS Zarrar; PNS Karrar	120 tons	Few more MRTP-33 or MRTP-35 craft are planned.
Larkana class		Gun boat	1	Pakistan	PNS Larkana	180 tons	
Chaser TM-1226 class		Rapid response boat	40	Poland			The Pakistan Navy is using the Chaser TM-1226 Rigid Inflatable Boats (RIB) for its Special Services Group Navy (SSGN) commandos.
Indigenous Gun Boats		Gun boat	1	Pakistan	PNS Sahiwal	220 tons	Being built with the assistance of Swift Ships USA. Keel laying of first boat was done on January 27, 2023. Remaining boats to be constructed in batches. First ship PNS Sahiwal launched at Karachi Shipyard & Engineering Works.
On order (19)
Indigenous Gun Boats		Gun boat	19	Pakistan		220 tons	To be constructed in batches.

=== Hovercraft ===
Class	Picture	Type	Quantity	Origin	Ship	Displacement	Note
Active (7)
Griffon 2400TD		Landing Craft Air Cushion (Light) LCAC(L) Hovercraft	3	United Kingdom		10 tons	Three delivered in July 2025. Mostly used by Pakistan Navy Marines & SSG(N).
Griffon 8100TD		Hovercraft	2	United Kingdom		10 tons	Two purchased in 2010. Mostly used by Pakistan Navy Marines & SSG(N).
Griffon 2000TD		Light Hovercraft	4	United Kingdom		6.8 tons	Inducted in December 2004. Mostly used by Pakistan Navy Marines & SSG(N).

== Auxiliary fleet ==
=== Surveillance ships ===
Class	Picture	Type	Qauntity	Origin	Ship	Displacement	Note
Rizwan class		Missile tracking ship	1	China	PNS Rizwan (A294)		Built by Fujian Mawei Shipbuilding Co., Ltd, China. Delivered to the Pakistan Navy in June 2023.

=== Mine countermeasure vessels ===
Class	Picture	Type	Quantity	Origin	Ship	Displacement	Note
Munsif class		Minehunter	5	France/Pakistan	PNS Munsif; PNS Muhafiz; PNS Mujahid PNS (TBA) PNS (TBA)	536 tons	Ex Tripartite-class mine hunters. First two ships were built in France, third ship was assembled in Pakistan by Karachi Shipyard.

=== Replenishment ships ===
Class	Picture	Type	Quantity	Origin	Ship	Displacement	Note
Moawin class		Replenishment oiler	1	Pakistan; Turkey	PNS Moawin (A39)	17,000 tons	One of the largest replenishment oiler in Navy inventory built by Karachi Shipyard under ToT with Turkish shipbuilder. One more planned under Navy Modernization plans.
Fuqing class		Replenishment oiler	1	China	PNS Nasr (A47)	22,099 tons	Type 905 replenishment tanker. Bought from China and commissioned on 26 August 1987.
Gwadar class		Coastal tanker	2	Pakistan	PNS Gwadar; PNS Kalmat	2000+ tons	Built by Karachi Shipyard, ships were commissioned on 5 November 1984 and 29 August 1992 respectively.
Madadgar class		Coastal tanker	2	Pakistan	PNS Madadgar; PNS Rasadgar	1600+ tons	Built by Karachi Shipyard, both ships were commissioned on 19 July 2011.

=== Support ships ===
Class	Picture	Type	Quantity	Origin	Ship	Displacement	Note
Behr Kusha class		Dredging vessel	1	China	PNS Behr Kusha		Built by Zhoushan Zhaobao Shipyard and commissioned on 15 August 2008.
Rah Kusha class		Backhoe dredger	1	China	PNS Rah Kusha		Built by China Tianjin Shipyard and commissioned on 15 March 2018.

=== Training vessels ===
Class	Picture	Type	Quantity	Origin	Ship	Displacement	Note
Rah Naward class		Tall sail	1	United Kingdom	PNS Rah Naward		Ex Prince William initially built in Germany and completed by Appledore Shipbuilders, was acquired from Tall Ship Youth Trust and commissioned on 23 September 2010.

=== Research and survey vessels ===
Class	Picture	Type	Quantity	Origin	Ship	Displacement	Note
Behr Masah class		Hydrographic survey vessel	1	China	PNS Behr Masah	3,000 tons	Built by Jiangsu Dajin Heavy Industry in China. Commissioned on 4 November 2019
Behr Paima class		Hydrographic survey vessel	1	Japan	PNS Behr Paima	1,200 tons	Built by Mitsubishi Heavy Industries in Japan. Commissioned in 1983. Might be replaced by Behr Masah.

=== Miscellaneous vessels ===
Class	Picture	Type	Quantity	Origin	Ship	Displacement	Note
Tarseel class		Split hopper barge	2	China	PNS Tarseel 1 PNS Tarseel 2		Built by China Tianjin Shipyard and commissioned on 15 March 2018.
Balochistan class		Ferry	1	China	PNS Balochistan		Built by Jianglong Shipbuilding Co., Ltd, China. Commissioned in September 2023.

== See also ==
- List of former ships of Pakistan Navy
- Pakistan Maritime Security Agency (Navy's maritime law enforcement branch equipped with larger vessels to patrol Pakistan's EEZ)
- Pakistan Coast Guards (PCG is a law enforcement agency equipped with small patrol boats for coastal operations)
- Karachi Naval Dockyard
- Currently active military equipment by country
