= Spanish submarine Siroco =

Acosta-class Spanish submarine

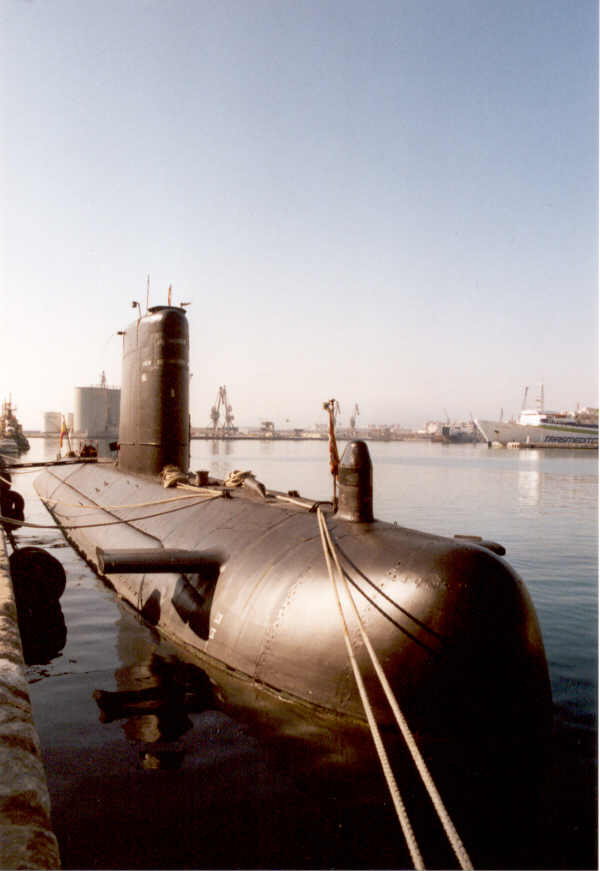
- Siroco in the port of Malaga, unknown date.

History

Spain
- Name: Siroco (S-72)
- Ordered: May 9, 1975
- Builder: Bazán, Cartagena, Spain
- Laid down: November 27, 1978
- Launched: December 12, 1982
- Commissioned: December 7, 1983
- Decommissioned: June 29, 2012
- Identification: S-72

General characteristics
- Class & type: Agosta-class submarine
- Displacement: 1,500 long tons (1,524 t) surfaced; 1,760 long tons (1,788 t) submerged
- Length: 67 m (219 ft 10 in)
- Beam: 6 m (19 ft 8 in)
- Speed: 12 knots (22 km/h; 14 mph) surfaced; 20.5 knots (38.0 km/h; 23.6 mph) submerged; 10.5 knots (19.4 km/h; 12.1 mph) submerged (snort)
- Test depth: 300 m (984 ft 3 in)
- Complement: 5 officers; 36 men
- Sensors & processing systems: Thomson CSF DRUA 33 Radar; Thomson Sintra DSUV 22; DUUA 2D Sonar; DUUA 1D Sonar; DUUX 2 Sonar; DSUV 62A towed array
- Armament: SM 39 Exocet; 4 × 550 millimetres (22 in) bow torpedo tubes; ECAN L5 Mod 3 & ECAN Fl7 Mod 2 torpedoes

Siroco (S-72) was an Agosta-class submarine built for the Spanish Navy by Bazán at Cartagena, Spain. The submarine was launched on December 12, 1982, commissioned on December 7, 1983. Because of the economic crisis, the government didn't authorize the reparations of the submarine and was decommissioned on June 29, 2012.

== History ==
Siroco was ordered by a ministerial order and on a proposal of the Office of the Chief of the Navy Staff in 1974 along with other Agosta class submarine, Galerna (S-71). The construction of the ships took place on Cartagena, Spain.

On June 13, 1985, the submarine was in Cartagena's waters in a practice exercises and the only ship near was a Spanish destroyer Almirante Valdés. The two ships collided at 8.52 am. This event alarmed the destroyer who ordered to be prepared to fight.

On June 2, 2010 the S-72 was quoted in some Spanish press and radio, for photos taken of a merchant with suspect military equipment off the coast of Syria. It was a NATO Active Endeavor mission held in early March of that year.

In May 2012, the cuts by the central government over the economic crisis made it impossible to invest at least €25 million in a contract with the shipyard of Navantia in Cartagena that had been postponed during the last two years and finale, the ship was decommissioned.

After the decommission, the Spanish Navy tried to sell the submarine to other navies like the Turkish or Thai Navy. After no one bought the submarine, it was scrapped.

== See also ==
- Agosta class
- Submarines of the Spanish Navy

=== Ships of the class ===
- Galerna (S-71)
- Mistral (S-73)
- Tramontana (S-74)

=== Similar ships ===
- Daphné-class submarine
