= PNS Hamza =

Agosta-90B class submarine of the Pakistan Navy

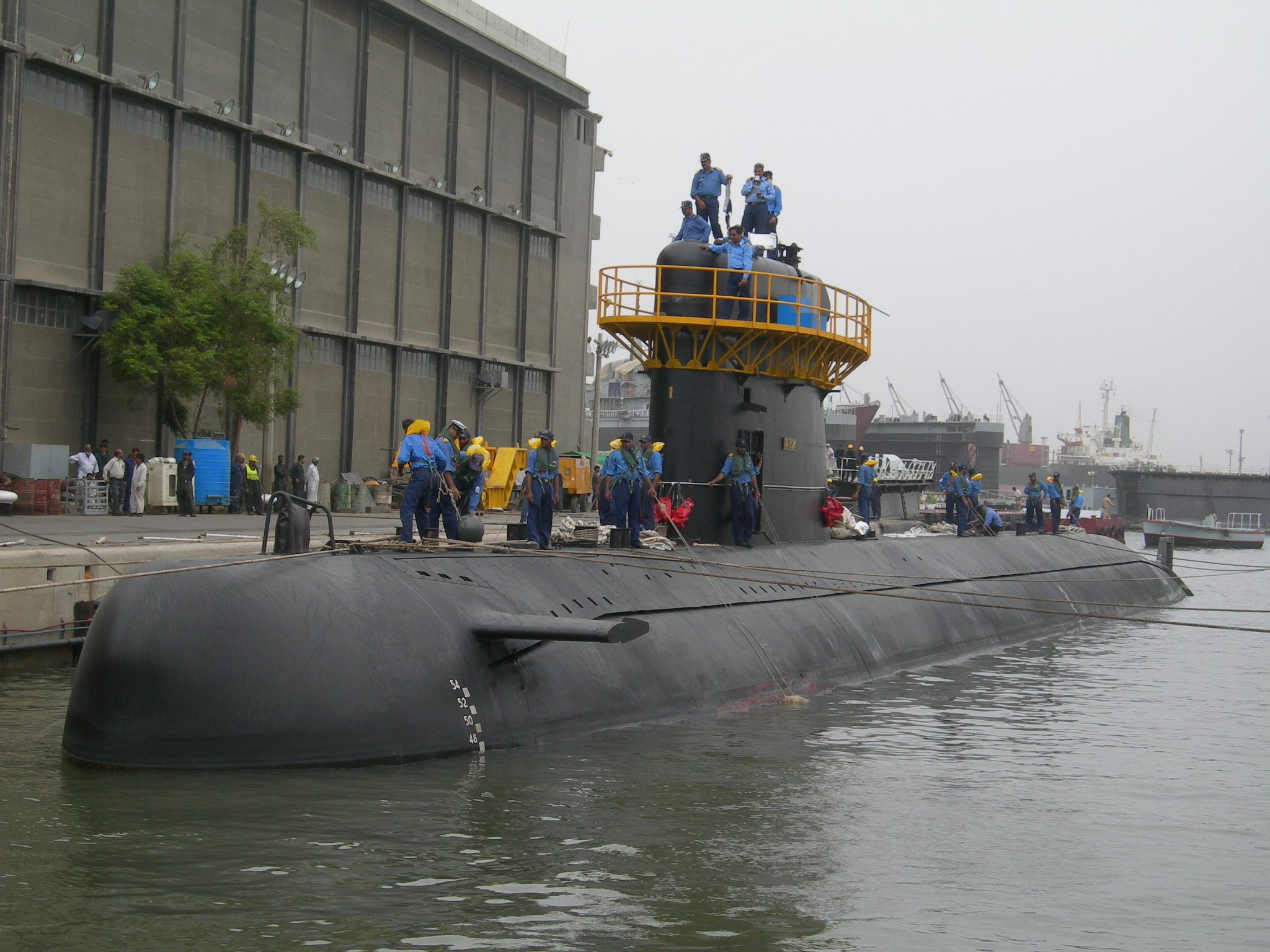
- PNS Hamza being prepared for its depth testings in Karachi in 2006.

History

Pakistan
- Name: PNS Hamza
- Namesake: Ḥamzah
- Ordered: 21 September 1994
- Builder: KSEW Ltd. in Pakistan
- Laid down: 1 March 1997
- Launched: 10 August 2006
- Sponsored by: Sehba Musharraf
- Commissioned: 23 September 2008
- In service: 2008–present
- Home port: Jinnah Naval Base
- Identification: S-139
- Status: In service

General characteristics
- Class & type: Agosta 90Bravo/Khalid-class submarine
- Displacement: 1,570 long tons (1,595 t) (Surface); 2,050 long tons (2,083 t) (Submerged)
- Length: 249.4 ft (76 m)
- Beam: 22.3 ft (6.8 m)
- Draught: 27 ft (8.2 m); 26.7 ft (8.1 m)
- Installed power: 2 × Jeumont-Schneider alternators producing: 4,600 hp (3,400 kW).
- Propulsion: 2 × SEMT Pielstick 16 PA4 V 185 VG AIP MESMA: 3,600 hp (2,700 kW), 1 × shaft.
- Speed: 12.0 knots (22.2 km/h; 13.8 mph) (surface); 20.5 knots (38.0 km/h; 23.6 mph) (submerged)
- Range: 10,000 miles (16,000 km) at 9 knots (17 km/h; 10 mph)
- Endurance: 150 Days
- Test depth: 1,968.5 ft (600 m)
- Complement: 50 (10 officers, 40 enlisted)
- Sensors & processing systems: Towed array sonar
- Electronic warfare & decoys: ESM: Thomson-CSF DR-3000U; intercept.; Low-probability-of-intercept
- Armament: DM2A4 SeaHake mod 4; Stonefish naval mines; 4 × 533 mm (21 in) bow torpedo tubes Up to 16 F17P Mod 2 torpedoes.; SSM: Exocet SM 39; SLCM: Babur–III

PNS/M Hamza (S-139) is a diesel-electric fast-attack submarine equipped with an air–independent propulsion system and the third submarine of its Agosta 90B/Khalid-class submarine. It was designed and constructed by the KSEW Ltd. under the technology transfer agreement with France in 1994.

PNS Hamza is the first submarine that has been fitted with the French MESMA system, which was an experimental at that stage – Pakistan is the first country to use the MESMA system in deep sea on board a submarine. It is the first submarine built in South Asia to feature an Air-independent propulsion.

== Design overview ==
PNS Hamza was designed and built by the KSEW Ltd. at the Karachi Naval Dockyard, with the participation of more than 300 civilian engineers and technicians trained in France's defense industry. In 1999–2004, the French and other European contractors reportedly trained more than 600 Pakistani machinists and metal workers in various construction skills of the submarine to meet the challenges of modern warfare in which submarines play a vital role. The construction of the submarine reportedly involves the employment of the local metal industry in the Navy's submarine construction program as had done previously when Saad was being rebuilt.

PNS Hamza is the most advanced version of the Agosta 90B design and is more advanced than her two sister ship, Khalid and Saad, as its outer hull is light steel structure, HLES 80, was built at the Pakistan Steel and fabricated at the Naval Dockyard in Karachi in element parts and mounted on the inner pressure hull. The pressure hull section was fabricated and outfitted by the Naval Dockyard in collaboration with the Karachi Shipyard.

PNS Hamza was laid down on 1 March 1997 in Karachi, and the steel cutting started by the Pakistan Steel Mills. The construction of the submarine started in 1998 by KSEW Ltd. at the Karachi Naval Dockyard, followed by fabrication of 12 pressure hull sub-sections and culminating into three pressure hull sections. This was followed by mounting of light bulkheads, internal tanks and ballast panels in August 2003.

== Service ==
On 10 August 2006, Hamza was launched, sponsored by Sehba Musharraf, the First Lady of Pakistan, and is named after Ḥamzah ibn ‘Abdul-Muṭṭalib– the companion and paternal uncle of Muhammad. Her maximum depth test was approximated at the 1,968.5 ft (600 m) in the Indian Ocean with the MESMA system, and is capable of launching the Exocet SM39 missiles while submerged on a seaborne platform.

After completing series of depth tests and sea trials in the Indian Ocean, Hamza was commissioned by then-Prime Minister Shaukat Aziz on 23 September 2008, and joined the Navy's Submarine Command on 26 September 2008. Her crew complement is reported as 50 personnel (10 officers, 40 enlisted).

== Upgrades ==
On 6 March 2018, the DCNS, its original builder, lost the bidding competition with the Turkish firm, STM, for its refitting and upgrading of her weapon system, combat control system, missile rooms, and periscope upgrades, and is slated to return to her active service in 2020 after returning from Turkey.

Upgrades on the submarine were completed in early 2021 and she was delivered to the Pakistan Navy in April that year.

== See also ==
- List of ships of Pakistan Navy
