= Exercise Sea Spark =

Pakistan Navy Exercise

Seaspark-12
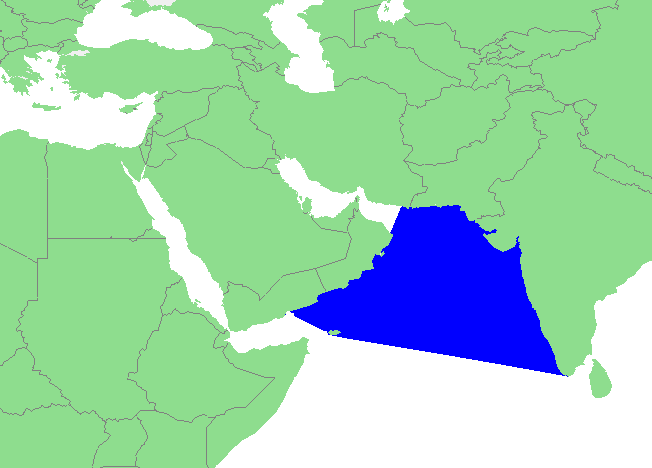
- Highlighted area where the exercise were conduct
- Type: Naval exercise
- Location: Arabian Sea
- Planned by: Naval Operations Branch
- Objective: Deployment of Pakistan Navy and amphibious assault forces
- Date: 17 September 2012 – present
- Executed by: VAdm Hasham Siddique, DCNS Operations

Exercise Sea Spark was the codename of a series of major naval exercises conducted by the Pakistan Navy to simulate naval warfare and the protection of the country's maritime border.

== Operation Readiness ==
The first exercise took place in the North Arabian Sea and started on 17 September 2012. The navy officials stated that exercises were aimed at assessing "operational readiness" and providing an opportunity to the officers and sailors to operate in a multi-threat environment and to exercise their responses accordingly.

In 2015 part of Exercise Sea Spark was witnessed by the prime minister. The Navy demonstrated a range of naval warfare operations against both traditional and non-traditional targets. Included were countering threats from terrorists and pirates. There were live weapon firings and naval aviation fly-bys.

== Deployment ==
The navy deployed all active-duty combatant ships, submarines, fighter jets and the special operations forces, including the entire division of Marines and the naval establishments to cover the entire gamut of naval operations. The exercise also included the joint involvement of the army and air force for the special joint operations. The navy put special emphasis on conventional and non-conventional war games, including the features of army (designated the "Blue forces") and air force (designated the Orange forces) pitching against navy (to determine the naval capabilities in joint operations) in specific threat environment.

== See also ==
- Pakistan military exercises

== Video conference ==
- "Briefing of Rear Admiral Hashim Siddique". ISPR (Navy).
