= PNS Saad =

Pakistan Navy air-independent propulsion submarine

History

Pakistan
- Name: PNS Saad
- Namesake: Sa`d
- Ordered: 21 September 1994
- Builder: KSEW Ltd in Pakistan
- Laid down: 6 June 1998
- Launched: 24 August 2002
- Acquired: 20 January 2003
- Commissioned: 12 December 2003
- In service: 2003–present
- Home port: Jinnah Naval Base
- Identification: S138
- Status: in active service

General characteristics
- Class & type: Agosta 90Bravo/Khalid-class submarine
- Displacement: 1,570 long tons (1,595 t) (Surface); 2,050 long tons (2,083 t) (Submerged)
- Length: 249.4 ft (76.0 m)
- Beam: 22.3 ft (6.8 m)
- Draught: 27.0 ft (8.2 m); 26.7 ft (8.1 m)
- Installed power: 2 × Jeumont-Schneider alternators producing: 4,600 hp (3,400 kW).
- Propulsion: 2 × SEMT Pielstick 16 PA4 V 185 VG AIP MESMA: 3,600 hp (2,700 kW), 1 × shaft.
- Speed: 12.0 knots (22.2 km/h; 13.8 mph) (surface); 20.5 knots (38.0 km/h; 23.6 mph) (submerged)
- Range: 8,500 miles (13,700 km) at 9 knots (17 km/h; 10 mph)
- Endurance: 90 Days
- Test depth: 1,312 ft (400 m) (Submerged)
- Complement: 41 (7 officers, 35 enlisted)
- Sensors & processing systems: Towed array sonar
- Electronic warfare & decoys: ESM: Thomson-CSF DR-3000U; intercept.; Low-probability-of-intercept
- Armament: DM2A4 SeaHake mod 4; Stonefish naval mines; 4 × 533 mm (21 in) bow torpedo tubes Up to 16 F17P Mod 2 torpedoes.; SSM: Exocet SM 39; SLCM: Babur–III

PNS/M Saad (S-138) is a diesel-electric fast-attack submarine equipped with an air–independent propulsion system and the second of the Agosta-90B/Khalid-class submarines jointly designed and constructed by France and Pakistan.

PNS Saad is regarded as the Pakistan's first home-built long-range submarine and one of the complex project of submarine construction using the military-grade steel to be built in Pakistan.

== Overview ==
After the series of complicated and lengthy negotiations between the governments of Pakistan and France, she was placed on order by the Pakistan Navy on 21 September 1994.

In June 1998, she was laid down by the French contractor, DCNS, in Cherbourg in France. Saad is unique among her class because she was partially built in Cherbourg and was shipped to Naval Base Karachi to be completed by the KSEW Ltd. in Karachi. Meanwhile, Khalid, the lead ship, was built entirely in France, while Hamza, the third submarine of the class, was built entirely in Pakistan. In 2009, there were several proposals that called for a further three submarines of the class to all be built entirely in Pakistan.

Prior to her launch, the 11 of the 80 French naval personnel in Pakistan to supervise the completion of Saad were killed when their transit bus was struck by a car filled with explosives. Contemporary news accounts reported that the French Chief of the Defence Staff, General Jean-Pierre Kelche, blamed the al-Qaeda for the attack took place on 8 May 2002.

On 24 August 2002, Saad was launched in Karachi's coast before being set for further trials in deep sea.

On 20 January 2003, Saad was tested for its propulsion system, chain steering system, fuel system, speed monitoring system, communication system and submarines habitability and atmospheric control system, according to the Pakistani military's ISPR. She was reportedly tested for her depth ratings, reaching at 400m under the sea. Her successful depth ratings were reported by the French Navy who later marked Pakistan's entry into the small club of countries to be able to build the modernized diesel-electric submarines.

On 12 December 2003, she was commissioned into the Pakistan Navy as PNS Saad, a namesake after Sa`d ibn Abi Waqqas– the companion of Muhammad. At the time her launching, India reportedly bought the aircraft carrier from Russia to counter the submarine's threat in the Indian Ocean but did not enter in the service of the Indian Navy until 2013. Her complement crew varies but is reported at 41 personnel (7 officers, 35 enlisted).

== Upgrades ==
In 2011, she underwent with overhauling, and retrofitted her propulsion system with the air-independent propulsion (AIP) systems by the technicians at the KSEW Ltd.

On 6 March 2018, the DCNS, its original builder, lost the bidding competition with the Turkish firm, STM, for its refitting and upgradation of her weapon system, combat control system, missile rooms, and periscope upgrades, and will receive her upgrades by the Turkish technical firms at the KSEW Ltd. in 2021 following the delivery of the PNS Khalid that is slated to be return to her military service in 2020.

== See also ==
- List of ships of Pakistan Navy
