= List of former ships of Pakistan Navy =

The following article lists the many former ships of the Pakistan Navy (PN) that are no longer in service. Older ships from the dominion era used the old "HMPS" Ship prefix which was replaced with the current "PNS" after Pakistan became a republic.

== Cruisers ==
Photo	Name	Previous names	Pennant	Previous pennant	Commissioned	Decommissioned	Fate	Notes
Dido-class
	PNS Jehangir	HMS Diadem; PNS Babur (1956–1982)	C-84	84	5 July 1957	1985	Broken up.	

== Destroyers ==
Photo	Name	Previous names	Pennant	Previous pennant	Commissioned	Decommissioned	Fate	Notes
O-class
	PNS Tughril	HMS Onslaught	F-261	G04; F204	6 March 1951	1977	Scrapped.	
	PNS Tipu Sultan	HMS Onslow	F-260	G17; D47; F-249	1949	1979	Scrapped in 1980.	
	PNS Tariq	HMS Offa	G29	―	30 November 1949	1959	Scrapped.	
C-class
	PNS Shah Jahan	HMS Charity	DD-962	R29	16 December 1958	1982	Broken-up following battle damage due to Indian missile strike	
	PNS Taimur	HMS Chivalrous	D21	R21	1954	3 June 1958	Broken-up in 1961.	
	PNS Alamgir	HMS Creole	160	R82; D82	29 February 1956	1982	Scrapped.	
	PNS Jahangir	HMS Crispin	162	R68; D168	18 March 1958	1982	Scrapped	
Battle-class
	PNS Badr	HMS Gabbard	D-161	D-47	24 January 1957	1985	Broken-up in 1989	
	PNS Khaibar	HMS Cadiz	D-163	D-79	1 February 1957	4 December 1971	Lost in combat during the 1971 Indo-Pakistani war.	
Gearing-class
	PNS Tariq	USS Wiltsie	D-165	DD-716	29 April 1977	1990	Transferred to the Pakistan Maritime Security Agency.	
	PNS Taimur	USS Epperson	D-166	DD-719	29 April 1977	1999	Sunk as a target in 2000.	
	PNS Tughril	USS Henderson	D-167	DD-785	30 September 1980	1998	Transferred to Pakistan Maritime Security Agency.	
	PNS Shah Jahan	USS Harold J. Ellison	D-164	DD-864	1 October 1983	1994	Sunk as target in 1994	
	PNS Alamgir	USS Cone	D-160	DD-866	1 October 1982	4 December 1998	Scrapped	
	PNS Tippu Sultan	USS Damato	D-168	DD-871	1 October 1980	1994	Scrapped	
County-class
	PNS Babur	HMS London	D-84	D-16	23 March 1982	1993	Scrapped in 1995.	
Tariq-class
	PNS Tariq	HMS Ambuscade	D-181	F-172	1 January 1993	5 August 2023	Transferred to the UK for conversion into a floating museum.	
	PNS Babur	HMS Amazon	D-182	F-169	30 September 1993	December 2014	Sunk as a target ship.	
	PNS Khaibar	HMS Arrow	D-183	F-173	26 June 1994	2022	Sunk as a target during Sea-Spark 2022.	
	PNS Badr	HMS Alacrity	D-184	F-174	26 June 1994	2014	Scrapped	
	PNS Tipu Sultan	HMS Avenger	D-185	F-185	23 September 1994	1 April 2020	Sunk as a target ship on 27 April 2020.	
	PNS Shah Jahan	HMS Active	D-186	F-171	23 September 1994	1 January 2021	Sunk as a target.	

== Frigates ==
Photo	Name	Previous names	Pennant	Previous pennant	Commissioned	Decommissioned	Fate	Notes
River-class
	PNS Shamsher	HMS Nadder; HMIS Shamsher	F-392	K392	1947	2 March 1959	Broken up.	Converted to a cadet training ship.
	PNS Zulfiqar	HMS Deveron; HMIS Dhanush	F-265	K265	1947	1983	Damaged beyond repair in December 1971 by friendly fire. Scrapped in 1983.	Converted to a survey ship.
Leander-class
	PNS Shamsheer	HMS Diomede	F-263	F16	July 1988	2003	Scrapped	
	PNS Zulfiqar	HMS Apollo	F-262	F70	14 October 1988	29 October 2006	Sunk as target on 12 March 2010.	
Garcia-class
	PNS Saif	USS Garcia	F-264	FF-1040	31 January 1989	13 January 1994	Returned to US, Scrapped	
	PNS Aslat	USS O'Callahan	F-265	FF-1051	8 February 1989	11 December 1993	Returned to US, Scrapped	
	PNS Harbah	USS Brumby	F-266	FF-1044	31 March 1989	9 September 1994	Returned to US, Scrapped	
	PNS Siqqat	USS Koelsch	F-267	FF-1049	31 May 1989	19 August 1994	Returned to US, Scrapped	
Brooke-class
	PNS Badr	USS Julius A. Furer	D-161	FFG-6	31 January 1989	11 December 1993	Returned to US, Scrapped	
	PNS Khaibar	USS Brooke	D-162	FFG-1	1 February 1989	14 November 1993	Returned to US, Scrapped	
	PNS Tabuk	USS Richard L. Page	D-163	FFG-5	31 March 1989	March 1994	Returned to US, Scrapped	
	PNS Hunain	USS Talbot	D-164	FFG-4	April 1989	29 November 1993	Returned to US, Scrapped	

== Corvettes ==
Photo	Name	Previous names	Pennant	Previous pennant	Commissioned	Decommissioned	Fate	Notes
Bathurst-class
	PNS Punjab	HMIS Punjab	―	J239	1947	1949	Scrapped.	

== Sloops ==
Photo	Name	Previous names	Pennant	Previous pennant	Commissioned	Decommissioned	Fate	Notes
Black swan-class
	PNS Jhelum	HMIS Narbada; HMPS Jhelum	Unknown	U-40	1948	July 1959	Scrapped.	
	PNS Sindh	HMIS Godavari; HMPS Sindh	Unknown	U-52	1948	July 1959	Records indicate it was pending disposal in 1960.	
Hastings-class
	PNS Karsaz	HMIS Hindustan	Unknown	U-80	1948	1960	Scrapped.	

== Patrol crafts & Fast attack crafts ==
Photo	Name	Previous names	Pennant	Previous pennant	Type	Commissioned	Decommissioned	Fate	Notes
HDML-class
	Unknown	―	SDML 3517	HDML 1261	Anti-submarine boat	1947	1975 - 1977	Unknown	
	Unknown	―	SDML 3518	HDML 1262	Anti-submarine boat	1947	1965	Scrapped.	
	Unknown	―	SDML 3519	HDML 1263	Anti-submarine boat	1947	1965	Scrapped.	
	Unknown	―	SDML 3520	HDML 1266	Anti-submarine boat	1947	1975 - 1977	Unknown	
Town-class
	PNS Rajshahi	―	P-140	―	Gunboat	8 March 1966	March 2026	Unknown	
	PNS Jessore	―	P-141	―	Gunboat	20 May 1965	―	Sunk in December 1971 and salvaged	
	PNS Comilla	―	P-142	―	Gunboat	20 May 1965	―	Sunk in December 1971	
	PNS Sylhet	―	P-143	―	Gunboat	2 August 1965	―	Sunk in December 1971	
Type 025 Huchuan-class
	Unknown	―	HDF 01	―	Torpedo boat	1973	1992	Sold to Bangladesh	
	Unknown	―	HDF 02	―	Torpedo boat	1973	1992	Sold to Bangladesh	
	Unknown	―	HDF 03	―	Torpedo boat	1973	1992	Sold to Bangladesh	
	Unknown	―	HDF 04	―	Torpedo boat	1973	1992	Sold to Bangladesh	
Type 062 Shanghai II-class
	PNS Lahore	―	P-140	―	Gunboat	1972 - 1973	1988 - 1994	Scrapped.	
	PNS Quetta	―	P-141	―	Gunboat	1972 - 1973	1988 - 1994	Scrapped.	
	PNS Mardan	―	P-143	―	Gunboat	1972 - 1973	1988 - 1994	Scrapped.	
	PNS Gilgit	―	P-144	―	Gunboat	1972 - 1973	1988 - 1994	Transferred to PMSA.	
	PNS Pishin	―	P-145	―	Gunboat	1972 - 1973	1988 - 1994	Transferred to PMSA.	
	PNS Sukkur	―	P-147	―	Gunboat	1972 - 1973	1988 - 1994	Scrapped.	
	PNS Sehwan	―	P-148	―	Gunboat	1972 - 1973	1988 - 1994	Scrapped.	
	PNS Bahawalpur	―	P-149	―	Gunboat	1972 - 1973	1988 - 1994	Transferred to PMSA.	
	PNS Bannu	―	P-154	―	Gunboat	1972 - 1973	1988 - 1994	Scrapped.	
	PNS Kalat	―	P-156	―	Gunboat	1972 - 1973	1988 - 1994	Scrapped.	
	PNS Larkana	―	P-159	―	Gunboat	1972 - 1973	1988 - 1994	Scrapped.	
	PNS Sahiwal	―	P-160	―	Gunboat	1972 - 1973	1988 - 1994	Transferred to PMSA.	
Type 024 Hegu-class
	PNS Haibat	Unknown	P-1021	Unknown	Missile boat	5 May 1981	2002 - 2003	Unknown	
	PNS Jalalat	Unknown	P-1052	Unknown	Missile boat	5 May 1981	2002 - 2003	Unknown	
	PNS Jurat	Unknown	P-1053	Unknown	Missile boat	Oct 1981	2002 - 2003	Unknown	
	PNS Shujaat	Unknown	P-1054	Unknown	Missile boat	Oct 1981	2002 - 2003	Unknown	
Type 021 Huangfeng-class
	PNS Azmat	Unknown	P-1025	Unknown	Missile boat	April 1984	2002 - 2003	Unknown	
	PNS Dehshat	Unknown	P-1026	Unknown	Missile boat	April 1984	2002 - 2003	Unknown	
	PNS Himmat	Unknown	P-1027	Unknown	Missile boat	April 1984	2002 - 2003	Unknown	
	PNS Guwwat	Unknown	P-1028	Unknown	Missile boat	April 1984	2002 - 2003	Unknown	

== Minesweepers ==
Photo	Name	Previous names	Pennant	Previous pennant	Commissioned	Decommissioned	Fate	Notes
MMS-class
	PNS Mujahid	HMIS MMS 129	M 629	J629	1948	1950	Scrapped.	
	PNS Ghazi	HMIS MMS 131	M 631	J631	1948	1950	Scrapped.	
	PNS Barq	HMIS MMS 132	M 632	J632	1947	1950	Scrapped.	
Bangor-class
	PNS Baluchistan	HMIS Baluchistan	M 182	J182	October 1948	1959	Scrapped.	
	PNS Chittagong	HMIS Kathiawar	M 155	J155	1948	1956	Scrapped.	
	PNS Peshawar	HMIS Malwa	M 55	J55	1948	22 January 1959	Sold	
	PNS Dacca	HMIS Oudh	M 245	J245	1948	22 January 1959	Scrapped.	
Adjutant-class
	PNS Muhafiz	―	M 163	―	February 1955	4 December 1971	Sunk by an Indian missile boat.	
	PNS Mujahid	―	M 164	―	November 1956	―	Museum ship at Pakistan Maritime Museum in Karachi, Pakistan	also called Mushahid
	Mubarak	―	M 161	―	8 January 1957	1995	Scrapped.	
	Mahmood	―	M 160	―	25 April 1957	1985	Scrapped.	
	Munsif	―	M 166	―	24 April 1959	1979	Scrapped.	
	Mukhtar	―	M 165	―	24 July 1959	1995	Scrapped.	
	Momin	―	M 161	―	14 July 1962	1985	Scrapped.	
	Moshal	―	M 167	―	29 June 1963	1985	Scrapped.	

== Naval trawlers ==
Photo	Name	Previous names	Pennant	Previous pennant	Commissioned	Decommissioned	Fate	Notes
Basset-class
	PNS Lahore	HMIS Rampur	P 12	T212	1948	1959	Scrapped.	
	PNS Bahawalpur	HMIS Baroda	P 149	T249	1948	1960	Scrapped.	

== Auxiliary ships ==
Photo	Name	Previous names	Pennant	Previous pennant	Type	Commissioned	Decommissioned	Fate	Notes
Mission Buenaventura-class
	PNS Dacca	USNS Mission Santa Clara	A-41	T-AO-132	Replenishment oiler	17 January 1963	―	Damaged beyond repair on 8/9 December 1971.	
Vulcan-class
	PNS Moawin	USS Hector	―	AR-7	Repair ship	20 April 1989	1994	Returned to US, Scrapped	
Poolster-class
	PNS Moawin	HNLMS Poolster	A-20	A835	Replenishment oiler	28 July 1994	October 2018	Scrapped on 21 April 2019	

== Submarines ==
Photo	Name	Previous names	Pennant	Previous pennant	Commissioned	Decommissioned	Fate	Notes
Tench-class
	PNS Ghazi	USS Diablo	S-130	SS-479	1 June 1964	4 December 1971	Sank under unknown circumstances while on a combat mission in the Bay of Bengal during the 1971 Indo-Pakistani war.	
Daphné-class
	PNS Hangor	―	S-131	―	12 January 1970	January 2006	Preserved at the Pakistan Maritime Museum.	
	PNS Shushuk	―	S-132	―	12 January 1970	January 2006	Sold for ship breaking to Pakistan National Shipping Corporation.	
	PNS Mangro	―	S-133	―	8 August 1970	January 2006	Scrapped by Pakistan National Shipping Corporation.	
	PNS Ghazi	NRP Cachalote	S-134	S-165	17 January 1977	January 2006	Scrapped by Pakistan National Shipping Corporation.	Portuguese built Albacora-class submarine (subclass of Daphné-class).

== See also ==
- List of active Pakistan Navy vessels
