= Muhammadi Steamship =

Defunct Pakistani shipping company

Muhammadi Steamship Company Limited
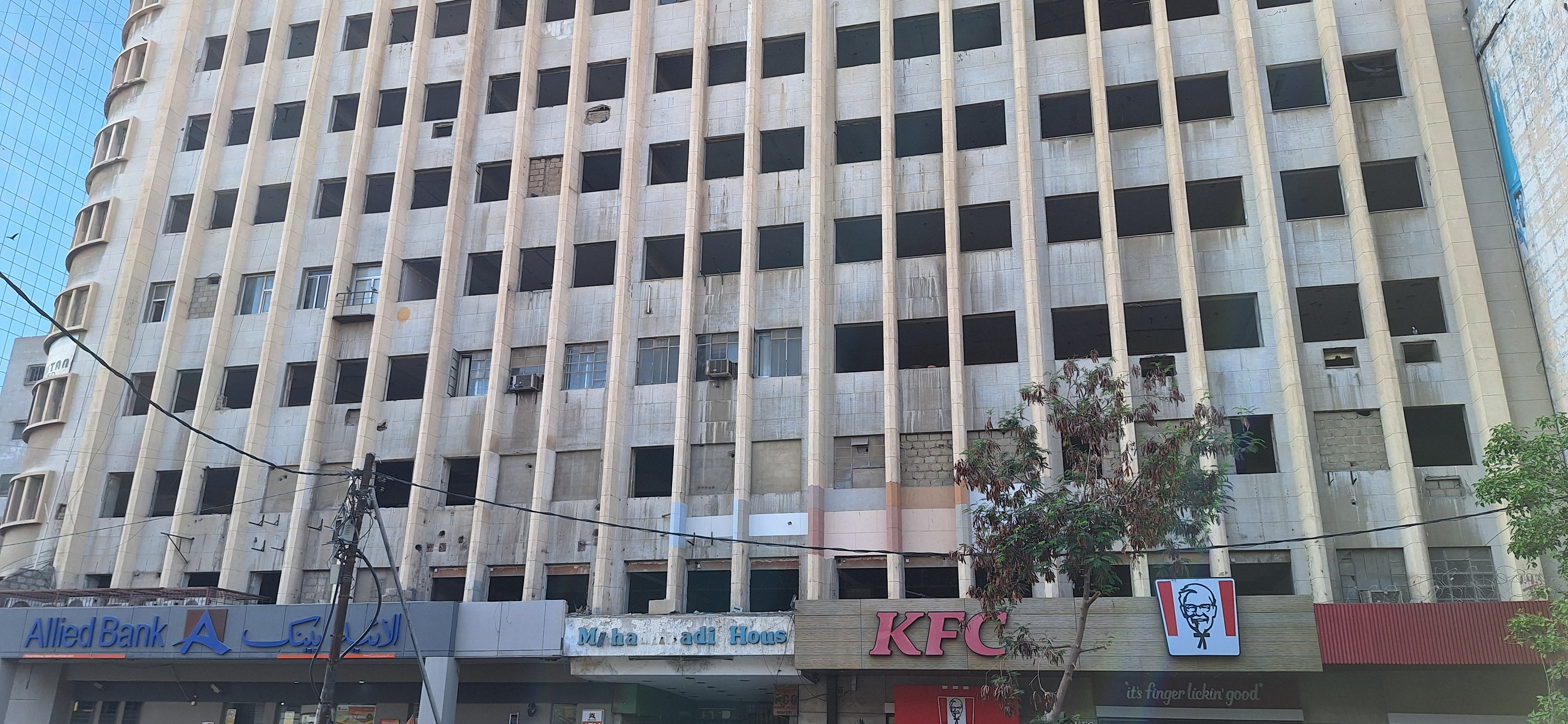
- Muhammadi Steamship Company Limited's headquarters were located at Muhammadi House on I.I. Chundrigar Road in Karachi
- Company type: Public
- Industry: Shipping
- Founded: 2 May 1947
- Defunct: 1974
- Fate: Nationalised by the Government of Pakistan
- Successor: Pakistan National Shipping Corporation
- Headquarters: Karachi, Pakistan
- Area served: Pakistan
- Key people: Fakhruddin Valika (chairman)
- Owner: Valika family Habib family

Muhammadi Steamship Company Limited was a Pakistani shipping company which was headquartered on Muhammad House in Karachi. It was one of the oldest locally owned shipping companies in Pakistan until it was nationalised in 1974.

== History ==
Muhammadi Steamship Company Limited was incorporated on 12 May 1947. It was a large-scale joint venture among business families of Pakistan, including Habib, Cowasjee, Dada, Arag, and Adam, which held ownership until 1963 when Valika family acquired the stake. Under the Valika family's leadership, the company built Al-Abbas, which was the first major ship to be built in Karachi Shipyard. The company was nationalized by the Government of Pakistan under then President Zulfikar Ali Bhutto. It was later merged with other Pakistani nationalized shipping companies to create the Pakistan National Shipping Corporation.

In 1949, it became the first Pakistani shipping line to be publicly listed on the Karachi Stock Exchange.

Muhammadi House on McLeod Road (now I. I. Chundrigar Road) was the headquarters of the company.

== Ships ==
Ship	Built	Tonnage	Builder	In Service	Fate	Notes
Al Murtaza Ali	1942	7235 GRT	West Coast Shipbuilders, Vancouver as 'Fort Norman'	1948 - 1954	Sold in 1954 to United Oriental Steamship Company, Karachi and renamed ANWARBAKSH	
Husaini later Al Husaini	1943	7157 GRT	North Vancouver Ship Repairers Ltd., North Vancouver as 'Fort Clatsop'	1948 - 1968	Broken up at Karachi in November 1968	Renamed in 1949
Ahmadi later Al Ahmadi	1920	5186 GRT	Todd Dry Dock & Construction Company, Tacoma as 'Pallas'	1948 - 1954	Broken up at Karachi in 1954	Renamed in 1949
Al Hasan	1943	7165 GRT	North Vancouver Ship Repairers Ltd., North Vancouver as 'Fort St. Antoine'	1949 - 1964	Broken up at Karachi in February 1964	
Colima later Al Chisti	1917	1306 GRT	Sodra Varfvets Nya A/B, Stockholm as 'Svealand'	1949 - 1954	Broken up at Karachi in 1954	Renamed in 1950
Al-Sayyada	1944	7165 GRT	Victoria Machinery Depot Company, Victoria B.C. as 'Hastings Park'	1952 - 1967	Broken up at Karachi in November 1967	First ship to dry dock at Karachi Shipyard.
Al Ahmadi	1940	5361 GRT	Lithgows Ltd., Port Glasgow as 'Risaldar'	1958 - 1966	Broken up at Karachi in June 1966	
Al-Abbas	1967	6087 GRT	Karachi Shipyard	1967 - 1971	Sunk on 16 August 1971 in Operation Jackpot by the Mukti Bahini commandoes at Chittagong	First merchant ship built at Karachi Shipyard.

== See also ==
- Merchant Navy (Pakistan)
- Merchant Navy
