= PNS Hurmat =

Diesel-electric submarine

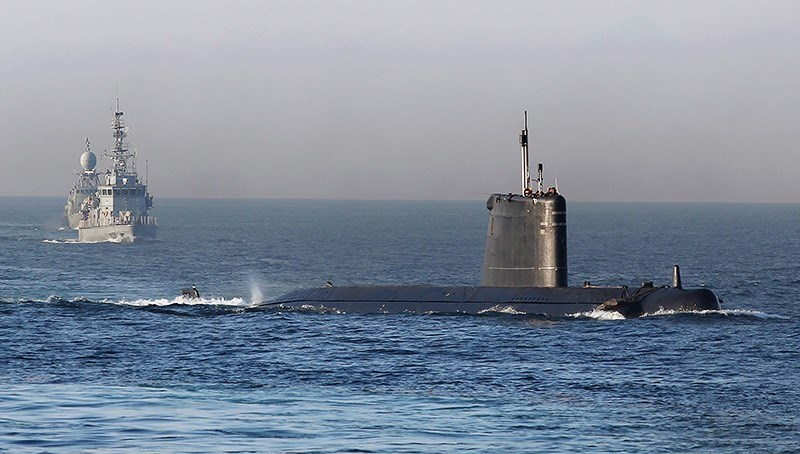
- PNS Hashmat, the sister ship of PNS Hurmat in Iran

History

South Africa
- Name: SAS Adventurous
- Fate: Not delivered because of UN sanctions, 418.

Pakistan
- Name: PNS Hurmat
- Builder: Dubigeon Normandie in France
- Laid down: 17 September 1977
- Launched: 1 December 1978
- Acquired: 1979
- Commissioned: 18 February 1980
- In service: 1980–present
- Home port: Naval Dockyard (1980-present)
- Identification: S-136

General characteristics
- Class & type: Hashmat-class submarine
- Displacement: Surfaced: 1,510 tons Submerged: 1,760 tons
- Length: 67 m (220 ft)
- Beam: 6 m (20 ft)
- Draught: 5.4 m (18 ft)
- Propulsion: Diesel-electric:2× SEMT-Pielstick 16 PA4 V 185 VG diesels; 3,600 hp(m) (2.65 MW); 2 alternators; 1.7 MW; 1 motor; 4,600 hp(m) (3.4 MW); 1 cruising motor; 31 hp(m) (23 kW); 1 shaft
- Speed: Surfaced: 12 knots (22 km/h; 14 mph); Submerged: 20.0 knots (37.0 km/h; 23.0 mph)
- Range: 8,500 miles (13,700 km)
- Test depth: 300 m (980 ft)
- Complement: 54, 7 Officers, 47 Enlists
- Sensors & processing systems: Thomson CSF DRUA 33 Radar; Thomson Sintra DSUV 22; DUUA 2D Sonar; DUUA 1D Sonar; DUUX 2 Sonar; DSUV 62A towed array
- Armament: SSM: UGM-84L Harpoon Block II; 4 × 550 mm (22 in) bow torpedo tubes for: ECAN L5 Mod 3 and ECAN F17 Mod 2 torpedoes

PNS/M Hurmat (S-136) is a Hashmat-class diesel-electric submarine based on the French Agosta-70-class design.

== History ==
She was initially named SAS Adventurous for the South African Navy and laid down on 18 September 1977. The submarine was launched on 1 December 1978 at Nantes in France. On 18 February 1980, she was commissioned in the Pakistan Navy as PNS Hurmat.

== See also ==
- List of active Pakistan Navy ships
