= MV Islamabad =

Ship built in 1983

History

Pakistan
- Name: MV Islamabad
- Owner: PNSC
- Operator: PNSC
- Builder: Karachi Shipyard & Engineering Works (KSEW)
- Completed: 1983
- Identification: IMO number: 7822706; Callsign: AQPE

General characteristics
- Tonnage: 17,200 dwt
- Length: 153.01 m
- Speed: 2
- Notes: 2 x Cranes SWL 25 tonnes, 5 x Velle Derricks DWL 22 tonnes

MV Islamabad is the largest general cargo and container ship built in Pakistan at the Karachi Shipyard & Engineering Works (KSEW). Islamabad has a capacity of 17,200 tonnes deadweight (DWT). Built in 1982, the ship is in service with Pakistan National Shipping Corporation.
