= Najmuddin Valika =

Pakistani industrialist and politician

Najmuddin Valibhai Valika was a Pakistani industrialist and politician who served as a member of the Provincial Assembly of West Pakistan representing Karachi-V.

Najmuddin Valika was born into a business family in Bombay, part of Dawoodi Bohra community. The family ran Valika Group in Pakistan and was named among the 22 richest families of Pakistan during Ayub Khan administration. After the nationlisation of their companies in Pakistan, Najmuddin left politics.

== See also ==
- Fakhruddin Valika
