= PNS Hashmat =

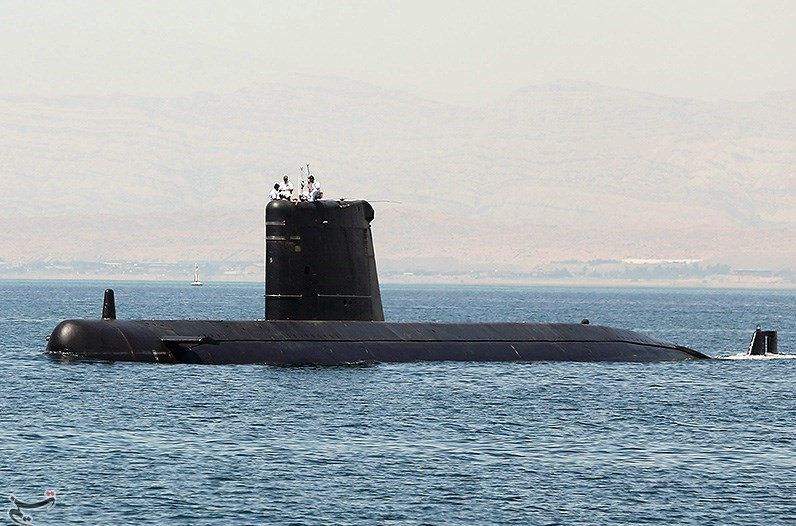
- PNS Hashmat in Persian Gulf.

History

South Africa
- Name: SAS Astrant
- Fate: Not delivered because of UN sanctions, 418.

Pakistan
- Name: PNS Hashmat
- Builder: Dubigeon Normandie in France
- Laid down: 15 September 1976
- Launched: 4 December 1977
- Acquired: 1979
- Commissioned: 17 February 1979
- In service: 1979-present
- Home port: Jinnah Naval Base (2014—)
- Identification: S-135

General characteristics
- Class & type: Hashmat-class submarine
- Displacement: Surfaced: 1,510 tons Submerged: 1,760 tons
- Length: 67 m (220 ft)
- Beam: 6 m (20 ft)
- Draught: 5.4 m (18 ft)
- Propulsion: Diesel-electric: 2× SEMT-Pielstick 16 PA4 V 185 VG diesels; 3,600 hp(m) (2.65 MW); 2 alternators; 1.7 MW; 1 motor; 4,600 hp(m) (3.4 MW); 1 cruising motor; 31 hp(m) (23 kW); 1 shaft
- Speed: Surfaced: 12 knots (22 km/h; 14 mph); Submerged: 20.0 knots (37.0 km/h; 23.0 mph)
- Range: 8,500 miles (13,700 km)
- Test depth: 300 m (980 ft)
- Complement: 54, 7 Officers, 47 Enlists
- Sensors & processing systems: Thomson CSF DRUA 33 Radar; Thomson Sintra DSUV 22; DUUA 2D Sonar; DUUA 1D Sonar; DUUX 2 Sonar; DSUV 62A towed array
- Armament: SSM: UGM-84L Harpoon Block II; 4 × 550 mm (22 in) bow torpedo tubes for: ECAN L5 Mod 3 and ECAN F17 Mod 2 torpedoes

PNS/M Hashmat (S-135) is the lead ship of Hashmat-class diesel-electric submarine based on the French Agosta-70-class design.

== History ==
=== Construction and deployment ===
She was initially named SAS Astrant for the South African Navy and laid down on 15 September 1976, and launched on 14 December 1977 at Nantes in France.

== See also ==
- List of ships of Pakistan Navy

== Bibliography ==
- Chant, Christopher (1987). A Compendium of Armaments and Military Hardware. New York: Routledge & Kegan Paul. pp. 158–59. ISBN 0-7102-0720-4. OCLC 14965544.
- "Hashmat Class (Fr Agosta-70)". GlobalSecurity.org. 27 April 2005.
