= PNS Jalalat =

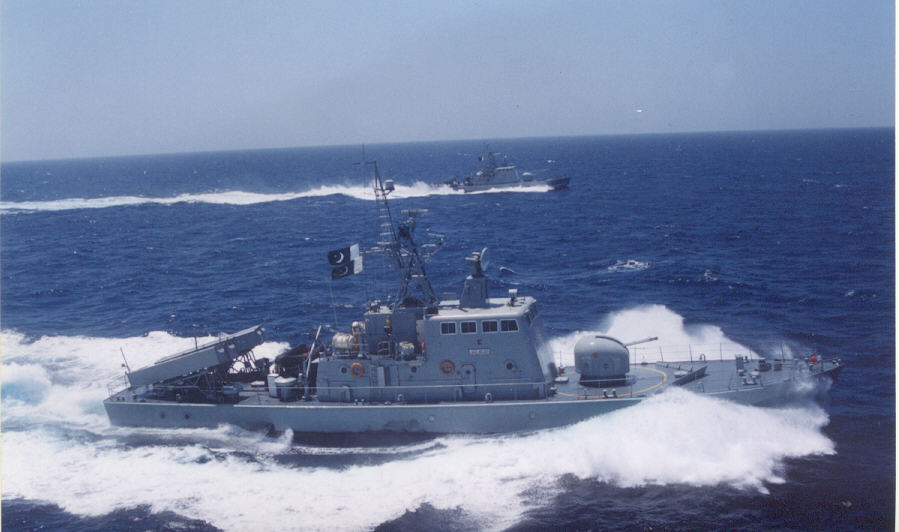
PNS Jalalat and PNS Shujaat

PNS Jalalat is a Pakistani ship. It is the first ship of the Jalalat class and was commissioned in August 1997. It was built by Karachi Shipyard. The ship is capable of conducting missile attacks, ESM support, air defense along with search and rescue operations. The ship can also operate in shallow waters for anti-surface warfare (ASuW) missions. This ship, like others of Jalalat class are inspired from 39-meter P157 Larkana patrol boat. The ship was a part of the goodwill visit to Abu Dhabi in January 2006.

== Structure and Equipment ==
The metal used for this ship is aluminium and it is a welded structure. Composite material is used to create the bulkhead to keep the weight of the ship further low. The sensors used for communication purposes are from western Europe. The ship took two years to build.
