= PNS Shujaat =

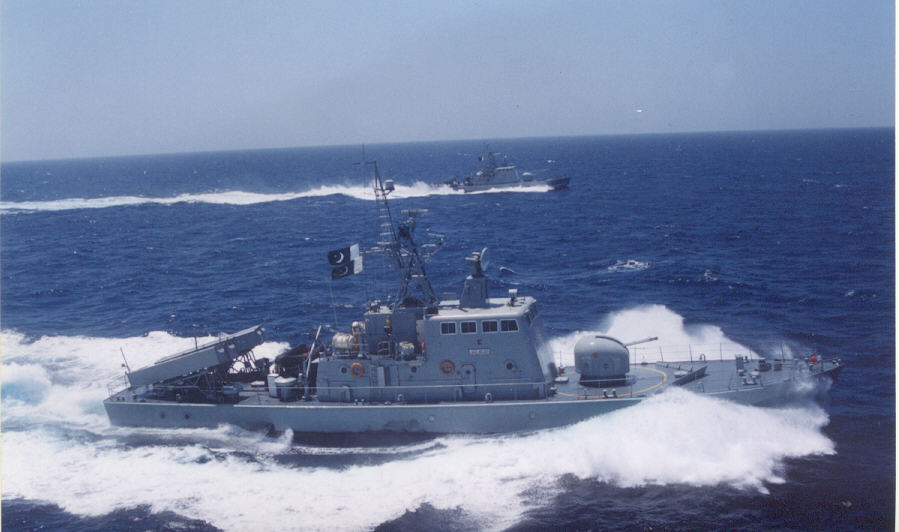
PNS Shujaat and PNS Jalalat

PNS Shujaat is an indigenous missile craft of Pakistan. It is second missile craft of Jalalat class (the first one named PNS Jalalat). Commissioned in September 1999, the ship was built at Karachi Shipyard. Pakistani president Muhammed Rafiq Tarar was present at the occasion. PNS Shujaat is 39 meters long and has a width of between 6 and 7 meters. The surface to surface long range missile. carried by the ship has a range of more than 100 kilometers. The technical expertise to construct the ship was given by Pakistan Navy. The ship was a part of DIMDEX in March 2012 in Doha.
