= Fakhruddin Valika =

Pakistani industrialist (died 1973)

Fakhruddin Valibhai Valika (died 1973) was a Pakistani industrialist who led the Valika Group, which had subsidiaries such as Valika Cement, Valika Steel now known as Peoples Steel, Valika Chemicals, Valika Textile, and Muhammadi Steamship Company Limited until the nationalisation of major industries in Pakistan.

Fakhruddin Valika was born into a business family in Bombay, part of Dawoodi Bohra community.

== Career ==
In 1947, Valika setup the first textile mill of Pakistan near Metroville, Karachi. It was inaugurated by Muhammad Ali Jinnah.

In 1959, Valika founded the United Insurance Company of Pakistan which was later listed on the Karachi Stock Exchange.

In 1972, Valika Cement, Valika Chemicals, Valika Steel, and later Muhammadi Steamship Company Limited were nationalised with compensation. After the nationalisation of Valika Group companies, Fakhruddin Valika was arrested by the Bhutto government and the event was shown live on the television.

Valika was a founding member of the Karachi Stock Exchange. He was one of the patrons of cricket and field hockey in Pakistan. He also established several charitable organizations.

== See also ==
- Najmuddin Valika
