= SS Al-Abbas =

History
- Name: Al-Abbas
- Owner: Muhammadi Steamship Company Limited
- Operator: Muhammadi Steamship Company Limited
- Port of registry: Pakistan
- Route: Karachi - Chittagong
- Builder: Karachi Shipyard & Engineering Works
- Completed: 1967
- Fate: Blown up and sunk in Operation Jackpot by Mukti Bahini

SS Al-Abbas was the first major ship to be built at the Karachi Shipyard in Pakistan in 1967.

== History ==
SS Al-Abbas was built for Muhammadi Steamship Company Limited in 1967. She was a cargo vessel plying between Karachi and Chittagong.

She was blown up and sunk on August 16, 1971, during Operation Jackpot in the Bangladesh Liberation War. She was berthed at Jetty No. 6 of the Port of Chittagong when Indian-trained commandoes of the Bangladeshi guerrilla force, Mukti Bahini, used limpet mines to blow her up.

== Specifications ==
- Registry: 18 January 1968
- Gross tonnage: 6,087
- DWT tonnage: 12,860
- LOA: 486 feet
