= Jacques Chirac's second term as President of France =

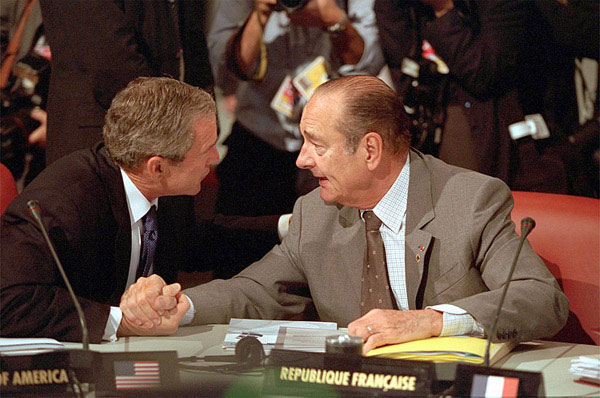
President Chirac and United States President George W. Bush talk over issues during the 27th G8 summit, 21 July 2001.

At age 69, Jacques Chirac faced his fourth campaign for the French Presidency in 2002. He was the first choice of fewer than one voter in five in the first round of voting of the presidential elections of April 2002. It had been expected that he would face incumbent prime minister Lionel Jospin on the second round of elections; instead, Chirac faced controversial far right politician Jean-Marie Le Pen of the law-and-order, anti-immigrant National Front, and won re-election by a landslide; most parties outside the National Front had called for opposing Le Pen, even if it meant voting for Chirac. Slogans such as "vote for the crook, not for the fascist" or "vote with a clothespin on your nose" appeared.

"We must reject extremism in the name of the honour of France, in the name of the unity of our own nation," Chirac said before the presidential election. "I call on all French to massively vote for republican ideals against the extreme right."

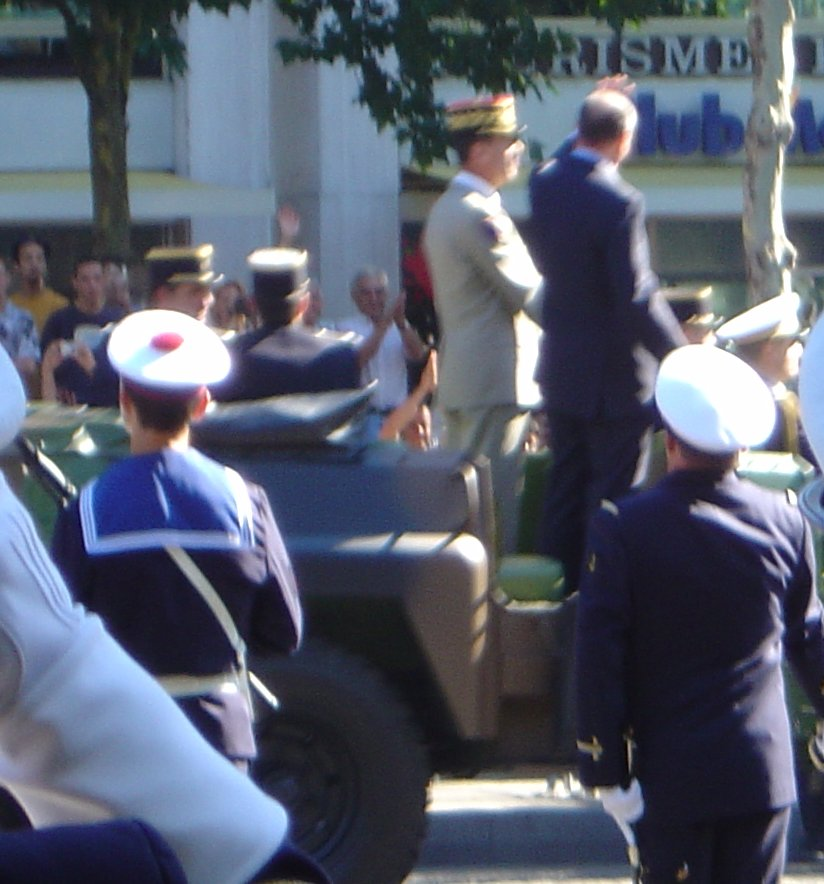
While Jacques Chirac was reviewing troops in a motorcade such as this one on Bastille Day 2002, he was shot at by a bystander.

The left-wing Socialist Party being in thorough disarray following Jospin's defeat, Chirac reorganized politics on the right, establishing a new party — initially called the Union of the Presidential Majority, then the Union for a Popular Movement (UMP). The RPR had broken down – a number of members had formed Eurosceptic breakaways; while the Giscardian liberals of the Union of French Democracy (UDF) had moved sharply to the right. The UMP won the parliamentary elections that followed the presidential poll with ease.

On 14 July 2002, during Bastille Day celebrations, Chirac survived an assassination attempt by a lone gunman with a rifle hidden in a guitar case. The would-be assassin fired a shot toward the presidential motorcade, before being overpowered by bystanders. The gunman, Maxime Brunerie, underwent psychiatric testing; the violent far-right group with which he was associated, Unité Radicale, was then administratively dissolved. Brunerie had also been a candidate for the Mouvement National Républicain, a far-right party at a local election. Brunerie's trial for attempted murder began on 6 December 2004; a crucial question was whether the court found that Brunerie's capacity for rational thought was absent (see insanity defence) or merely altered. On 10 December, the court, exceeding the sentence pushed for by the prosecution, sentenced Brunerie to 10 years in prison.

Chirac emerged as a leading voice against US president George W. Bush's administration's conduct towards Iraq. Despite intense U.S. pressure, Chirac threatened to veto, at that given point, a resolution in the U.N. Security Council that would authorize the use of military force to rid Iraq of alleged weapons of mass destruction, and rallied other governments to his position. Russia, another permanent UN Security Council member, said it, too, would use its veto against such a resolution, (cf. Governments' pre-war positions on invasion of Iraq and Protests against the 2003 Iraq war). "Iraq today does not represent an immediate threat that justifies an immediate war", Chirac said on 18 March 2003. Chirac was then the target of various American and British commentators supporting the decisions of president Bush and prime minister Tony Blair. See also anti-French sentiment in the United States. Suspected French involvement in "under the table" deals with Saddam Hussein have led many supporters of the war to question Chirac's motives in opposing the invasion of Iraq.

During a state visit to the People's Republic of China on 21 April 2005 Chirac's Prime Minister Jean-Pierre Raffarin lent support to the new Anti-Secession Law, which justified an invasion of Taiwan by the PRC in the event of a declaration of Taiwan independence, and continued to push for a lift of the European Union arms embargo against China. France's position was seen as attempting to aid China in altering the balance of power against the U.S. in East Asia, in which the control of Taiwan is of utmost importance. This drew widespread condemnation from the U.S. which responded by threatening sanctions against the EU unless the embargo was continued.

On 29 May 2005 a referendum was held in France to decide whether the country should ratify the proposed Constitution of the European Union. The result was a victory for the No campaign, with 55% of voters rejecting the treaty on a turnout of 69%, dealing a devastating blow to Chirac and the UMP party. Chirac's decision to hold a referendum was thought to have been influenced in part by the surprise announcement that the United Kingdom was to hold a vote of its own. Although the adoption of a Constitution had initially been played down as a 'tidying-up' exercise with no need for a popular vote, as increasing numbers of EU member states announced their intention to hold a referendum, the French government came under increasing pressure to follow suit.

French voters turned down the proposed document by a wide margin, which was interpreted by some as a rebuke to Chirac and his government. Two days later, Jean-Pierre Raffarin resigned and Chirac appointed Dominique de Villepin as Prime Minister of France.

In an address to the nation, Chirac has declared that the new cabinet's top priority would be to curb the unemployment level, which consistently hovers above 10%, calling for a "national mobilization" to that effect. One of the main promises of Jean-Pierre Raffarin when he became Prime Minister had been to spur growth and that "the end of President Chirac's term would be marked by a drop in unemployment". However, at the time of his dismissal, no such improvement could be seen. Villepin set himself a deadline of a hundred days to restore the French people's trust in their government (note that Villepin's first published book was titled The Hundred Days or the Spirit of Sacrifice).

== Laïcité ==
The Law of Secularity and Conspicuous Religious Symbols in Schools was passed in September 2004. This law stated all religious items could no longer be worn in public schools including but not limited to: kippah's, catholic crosses, and Muslim religious attire.

== 2012 Olympics ==
Chirac became the subject of controversy the day before the International Olympic Committee was due to pick a host city for the 2012 Summer Olympics. Chirac made comments stating that "the only worse food than British food is Finnish" and "the only thing the British have done for Europe's agriculture is mad cow disease". Not only were Chirac's comments considered unsportsmanlike where the normal etiquette is not to criticize rival cities, there was also the presence of two Finnish members on the International Olympic Committee who would vote in the final ballot. Out of the competing candidate cities, the bid was widely acknowledged as the front runner but Paris's narrow loss to arch-rival London led many to believe that Chirac's comments were at fault. It seems that the French public laid the blame of the failure on President Chirac, and not on the Mayor of Paris Bertrand Delanoë, whose popularity had in fact risen according to polls.

Even longtime Chirac supporters had lost their faith. Jean-Louis Debré, president of the National Assembly and a faithful Chirac supporter, declared "I'm not sure that Jacques Chirac succeeded in his presidency. I'd at least like that he succeeds in his exit." According to a July 2005 poll, 32% judge Jacques Chirac favorably and 63% unfavorably.

It is unclear whether Jacques Chirac will run for a third mandate in 2007 and, should he not run or should he fail in a re-election bid, whether he risks prosecution and jail time for the various fraudulent schemes he has been named in. While he is currently immune from prosecution as a president, prescription (i.e. the statute of limitations) does not apply. His authority was seriously weakened by the October–November 2005 Paris suburb riots in which hundreds of cars and numerous warehouses were set alight throughout France by thousands of alienated North African immigrants who complain of widespread discrimination and unemployment. The riots were triggered by the accidental deaths of two North African immigrants in a poor Paris suburb named Clichy-sous-Bois who were rumoured to be fleeing from police. Chirac later acknowledged that France had not done enough to integrate its Muslim North African citizens into French society or combat racism.

One issue seen of increasing importance with respect to a possible 2007 re-election bid is Jacques Chirac's age and health. Chirac has often been described to be extremely resilient and hard-working, and to have conserved a legendary appetite; before 2005, he had never had major health problems throughout his long political career. He used to be a heavy smoker but had given up many years ago. Nevertheless, it has become apparent that he is also careful of hiding signs that may betray declining health. In October 2003, there was an intense debate about French leaders' tradition of keeping secret their medical problems (for example Mitterrand's cancer was hidden for 14 years); Jacques Chirac has gone slightly deaf in one ear, and a former Environment Minister Roselyne Bachelot had revealed that a small hearing aid had been fitted discreetly into Mr Chirac's left ear. This debate leading to accusations of secrecy and speculation emerged once again in September 2005 when Chirac following a suspected stroke ( which provoked "slight impairment in his field of vision"), making it increasingly unlikely that he will run for a third term in 2007 and stoking the undeclared succession battle between Villepin and Nicolas Sarkozy (Villepin was appointed to serve in Chirac's place in the United Nations 2005 World Summit in New York City).

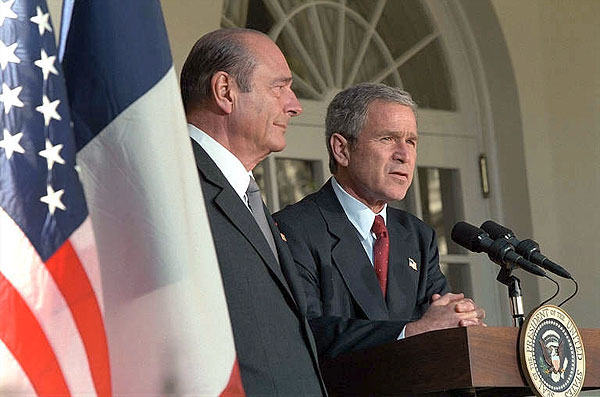
Jacques Chirac with George W. Bush, President of the United States of America.

On 19 January 2006, Chirac said that France was prepared to launch a nuclear strike against any country that sponsors a terrorist attack against French interests. He said his country's nuclear arsenal had been reconfigured to include the ability to make a tactical strike in retaliation for terrorism.

On 17 March 2006, Chirac, was involved in a controversy over a youth employment law after protests in Paris against the measure ended in violence and 187 arrests.

Unions and student groups were reported to be planning further action, claiming up to 600,000 university and high school students took part in Thursday's action. They have tied any talks to withdrawal of the employment law, which is opposed by 68% of French people, according to an opinion poll published in Le Parisien newspaper, a rise of 13 percentage points in a week. Critics say the legal reform will create a generation of "disposable workers", but ministers tried to conciliate growing opposition, one saying no worker could be laid off without justification. The first employment contract (CPE) was designed to cut youth unemployment by allowing employers to dismiss workers under 26 within their first two years in a job. This led to a turn around by Chirac and his Prime Minister on the 10 April saying the controversial law was to be scrapped. Chirac took the unprecedented step of signing the bill into law while at the same time calling for not applying the CPE clauses, a move with no base in the French Constitution. Stating the 'palpable discontent' in his country Chirac promised a more popular law would be enacted.

During April and May 2006, President Chirac's administration was beset by a crisis as his chosen Prime Minister, Dominique de Villepin, was accused of asking General Rondot, a top level French spy, of asking for a secret investigation into the latter's chief political rival, Nicolas Sarkozy in 2004. This matter has been called the Clearstream Affair. On 10 May 2006, following a Cabinet meeting, Chirac made a rare television appearance to try to protect Prime Minister Villepin from the scandal and to debunk allegations that Chirac himself had set up a Japanese bank account containing 300 million francs in 1992 as Mayor of Paris. Chirac stated that "The Republic is not a dictatorship of rumours, a dictatorship of calumny." Some political commentators note that the president's authority and credibility is in serious decline due to this scandal and combined impact of the French voters rejection of the European Union constitution in May 2005 which Chirac had publicly championed.

In July 2006, the G8 met to discuss international energy concerns. Despite the rising awareness of global warming issues, the G8 focussed on "energy security" issues. President Chirac continued to be the voice within the G8 summit meetings to support international action to curb global warming and climate change concerns. He warned that "humanity is dancing on a volcano" and called for serious action by the world's leading industrialized nations.
