= Spanish submarine Galerna =

Submarine

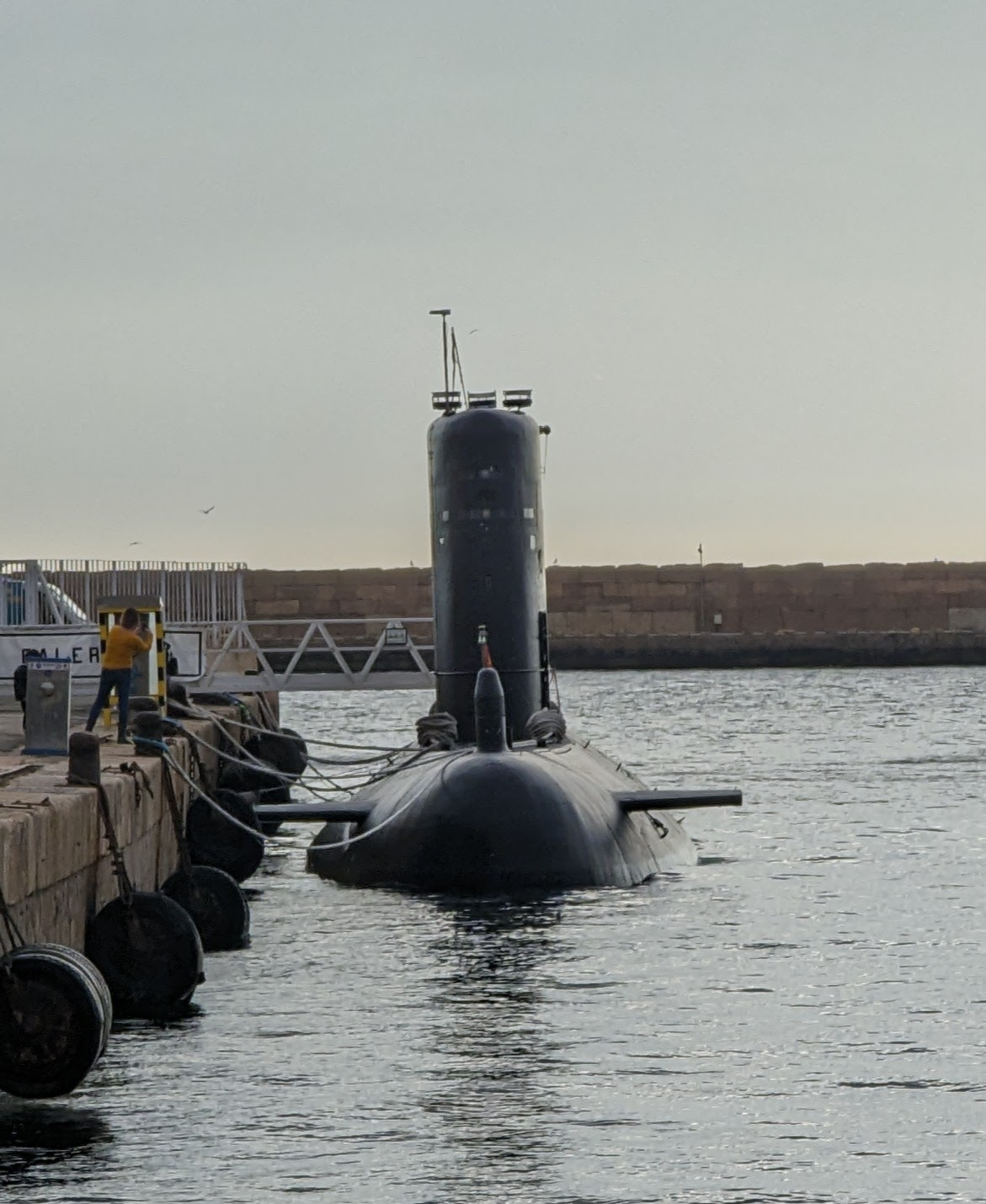
- Galerna in Almería in 2023

History

Spain
- Name: Galerna
- Builder: Bazán, Cartagena, Spain
- Launched: 5 November 1981
- Commissioned: 21 January 1983
- Identification: S-71
- Status: Active in service

General characteristics
- Class & type: Agosta-class submarine
- Displacement: 1,500 long tons (1,524 t) surfaced; 1,760 long tons (1,788 t) submerged
- Length: 67 m (219 ft 10 in)
- Beam: 6 m (19 ft 8 in)
- Speed: 12 knots (22 km/h; 14 mph) surfaced; 20.5 knots (38.0 km/h; 23.6 mph) submerged; 10.5 knots (19.4 km/h; 12.1 mph) submerged (snort)
- Test depth: 300 m (984 ft 3 in)
- Complement: 5 officers; 36 men
- Sensors & processing systems: Thomson CSF DRUA 33 Radar; Thomson Sintra DSUV 22; DUUA 2D Sonar; DUUA 1D Sonar; DUUX 2 Sonar; DSUV 62A towed array
- Armament: SM 39 Exocet anti-ship missiles; 4 × 550 millimetres (22 in) bow torpedo tubes; ECAN L5 Mod 3 & ECAN Fl7 Mod 2 torpedoes

Galerna (S-71) is an Agosta-class submarine of the Spanish Navy, currently in service. She was built by Bazán at Cartagena, Spain. Galerna was launched on 5 November 1981 and commissioned on 21 January 1983.

== History ==
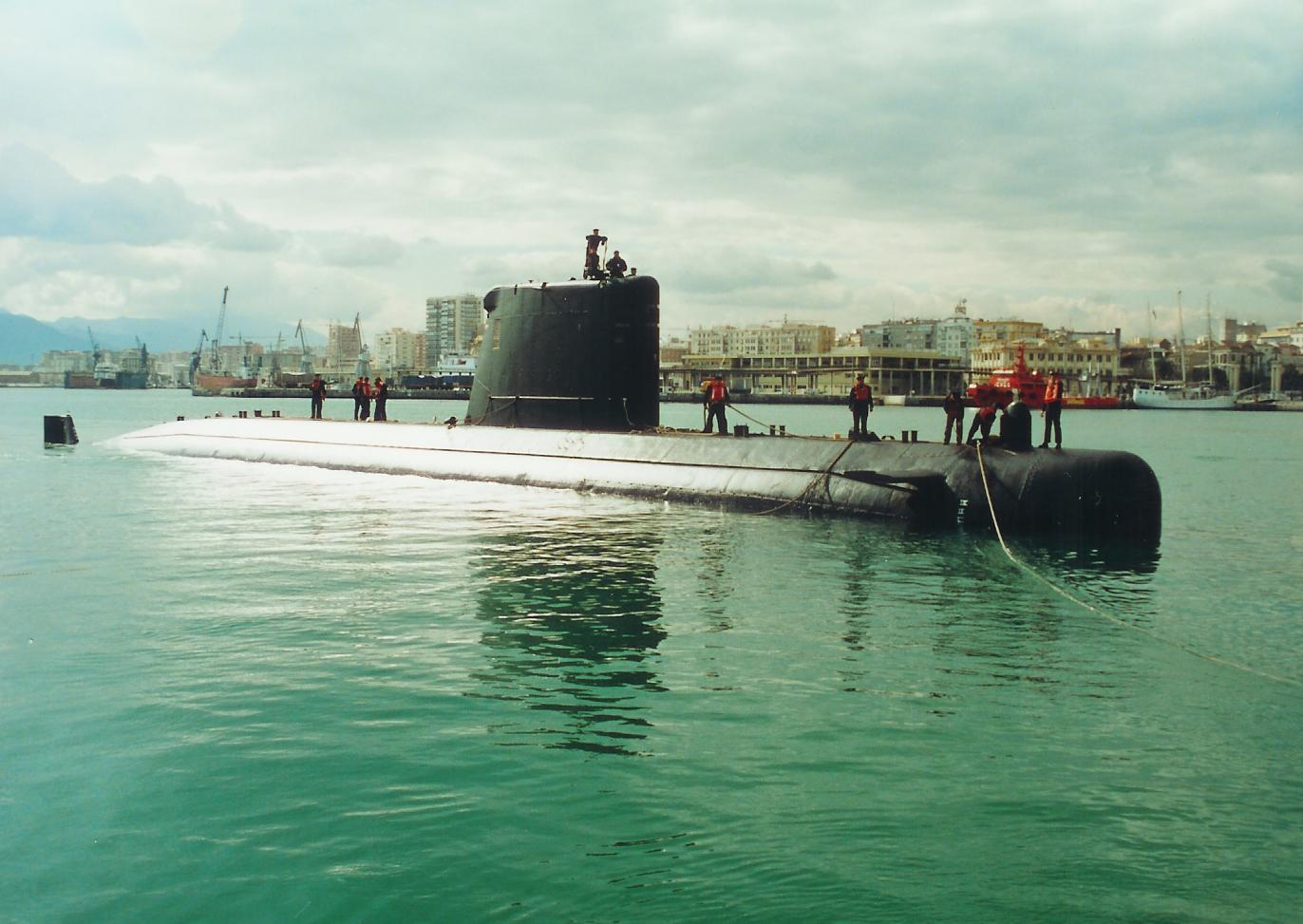
Galerna carrying out the docking maneuver in the port of Málaga in 2001

Over the course of her career Galerna had taken part in a number of international and NATO exercises, including Sorbet Royal, Dogfish, Linked Seas, Dragon Hammer, Noble Marlin, TAPÓN, ALFEX, and MINEX. On 26 May 2016 Galerna returned to Cartagena from a deployment with the anti-terrorist Operation Active Endeavour in the Mediterranean. During the deployment Galerna spent a month and a half monitoring possible illegal and terrorist activities.

The Agosta-class submarines in Spanish service had a projected service life of 30 years. However, due to delays in the successor S-80-class program, they have undergone numerous repairs. Galerna was scheduled for another large overhaul in the summer of 2017, the fifth over her career, to extend her service life until the delivery of the next generation of submarines. Galerna began her post-refit sea trials in July 2022. The refit aimed to extend her operational service life by five years with a return to operational service envisaged at the end of August.

== See also ==
- List of submarines of the Spanish Navy
