= Karachi Shipyard & Engineering Works =

Shipbuilding company based in Karachi, Pakistan

Coordinates: 24°51′N 66°59′E

Karachi Shipyard & Engineering Works Limited
- Native name: کراچی احاطہ برائے مہندسی و جہاز سازی
- Type: State owned company
- Industry: Shipbuilding, Defence
- Founded: 1957; 69 years ago
- Headquarters: Karachi, Sindh, Pakistan
- Area served: Asia
- Key people: Rear-Admiral Salman Ilyas (Managing Director)
- Products: Warships, Submarines, Merchant vessels, Barges, Tugboats, Dredgers, Floating Drydocks
- Owner: Ministry of Defence Production (Pakistan)
- Website: www.karachishipyard.com.pk

The Karachi Shipyard & Engineering Works Limited (KS&EW Ltd.) is a major defence contractor and shipbuilding company situated in the West Wharf in Karachi, Sindh in Pakistan.

The KSEW Ltd. is sponsored and owned entirely by the Ministry of Defence Production whose corporate leadership comes directly from the Navy HQ of the Pakistan Navy. With Pakistan Navy being its primary customer, the KSEW Ltd. also has contracts with the National Shipping Corporation, Karachi Port Trust, Port Qasim Authority, and with a wide range of customers in the private sector in Pakistan.

The current managing director of KS&EW is Rear Admiral Salman Ilyas. Karachi Shipyard & Engineering Works acquired the ISO 9001 certification in 2000.

== History and overview ==
The planning to establish the shipyard in Karachi began in 1947 as it was deemed essential for the defense of the country. In 1952, the Government of Pakistan reached out to Government of Germany for funding and loan feasibility, which both nation agreed upon. In 1955, the Karachi Shipyard & Engineering Works Limited was established when Pakistan Industrial Development Corporation (PIDC) commissioned a project that was delivered to Karachi Port Trust (KPT) in 1957.

Since 1955, the KSEW Ltd. remains under government sponsorship and is entirely owned by the Ministry of Defence Production. It corporate leadership is approved as deputation by the Navy HQ of Pakistan Navy. The KSEW Ltd. has attained product certification and qualification from the Turkey and United Kingdom's registry, but it usually follows British standards for quality of its products.

The KSEW Ltd. is the only company in Pakistan that has ability and capability to build deep-sea warships, and the primary builder of submarines since its establishment in 1955.

== Projects ==
=== Submarine construction ===
The KSEW Ltd. is the only company in the country that has ability and capability to build deep water submarines, owing major contributions from France in 1990s and later China. In 1990s, France agreed upon exporting the technology of Agosta 90B class submarine, two of which submarines were built by the KSEW Ltd. under French supervision. The French DCNS mostly oversaw the program until 2006, and were refitted with air-independent propulsion technology in 2011.

As of current, the KSEW Ltd. is currently building the Hangor-class submarines for the Pakistan Navy.

In a joint collaboration with the former China Shipbuilding Industry Corporation (CSIC), now China State Shipbuilding Corporation (CSSC), the deep-water and air-independent propulsion submarines are being designed and constructed at the KSEW Ltd.– out of which, four are being built in China and rest of four in Karachi. Working with China increased the employment rate and scope of the KSEW Ltd. with Pakistani government reportedly spent little capital on upgrading the facilities because much of the current submarine building infrastructure already meets the requirement. The KSEW Ltd. is currently acting as submarine base for the Type 039A submarine, which China leased to Pakistan for training and education purpose before the Hangor is commissioned in the military service.

Name	Hull number	Class	Type	Commissioned	Status
PNS Saad	S-138	Agosta 90B	AIP	12 December 2003	Active
PNS Hamza	S-139	Agosta 90B	AIP	23 September 2008	Active
PNS Tasnim	S-??	Hangor		Keel laid; currently under construction.	
PNS Seem Mai	S-??	Hangor		Keel laid; currently under construction.	
PNS ??	S-??	Hangor			
PNS ??	S-??	Hangor			

=== 17,000 Ton Fleet Tanker ===
A contract was signed on 22 January 2013 between the Ministry of Defence Production, Pakistan and STM, Turkey to construct a 17000 ton fleet tanker for the Pakistani Navy. The Kit of Material was provided by STM and the construction, outfitting took place at KS&EW. The construction of the vessel started on 27 November 2013 and it was launched on 19 August 2016. This is the largest warship built in Pakistan till date.

=== MILGEM Class Corvette (warship) ===
MILGEM Class Corvette will be the most technologically advanced surface platforms of the Pakistan Navy fleet. Keel Laying ceremony of third MILGEM class warship held. The warship will complete in 2024.

== Production ==
=== Merchant vessels ===
- Al-Abbas - first one was built in 1967 for Muhammadi Steamship Company Limited.
- MV Lalazar - A 13,300 DWT Cargo Vessel was built for National Shipping Corporation, Pakistan. Delivered on 20th Nov 1974.
- MV Hetian - A 13,160 DWT Cargo Vessel was built for China National Machinery Import & Export Corporation, China, in 1978.
- MV Islamabad - MV Islamabad is the largest general cargo and container ship built at KS&EW with 17,200 DWT. The ship is in service with Pakistan National Shipping Corporation.
- You Ti 20 - A 17,000 TDW Bulk Carrier You Yi 20 was built in 1992 for China National Machinery Import & Export Corporation.

=== Naval vessels ===
==== Frigates ====
- PNS Aslat of the F-22P Zulfiquar class frigate
- PNS Shah Jahan

==== Corvettes ====
- 2 corvettes of the PN MILGEM class corvette

==== Multi-Purpose Patrol craft ====
- PNS Dehshat of the Azmat class missile boat
- PNS Jurrat & PNS Quwwat of the Jurrat class missile boat
- PNS Jalalat & PNS Shujaat of the Jalalat II class missile boat
- PNS Larkana & PNS Rajshahi of the Larkana class Gunboat
- Maritime Patrol Vessels (600 and 1500 tones displacement) for Pakistan Maritime Security Agency. Both commissioned.

==== Mine Countermeasure Vessels ====
- PNS Mujahid of the Tripartite-class minehunter

==== Submarines ====
- PNS Hamza & PNS Saad of Agosta 90B class submarine class
- PNS Khalid submarine
- Hangor-class submarine

==== Auxiliary Vessels ====
- PNS Moawin (A39) – 17,000 Tons Fleet Tanker
- PNS Bhit Shah – Split-Hopper Barge
- PNS Kalmat & PNS Gwadar – Coastal Tankers
- PNS Madadgar & PNS Rasadgar – Small Tanker Cum Utility Ship

== See also ==
- Gwadar Shipyard
- Defence industry of Pakistan
- List of shipbuilders and shipyards
