= LCAC(L) =

Amphibious hovercraft

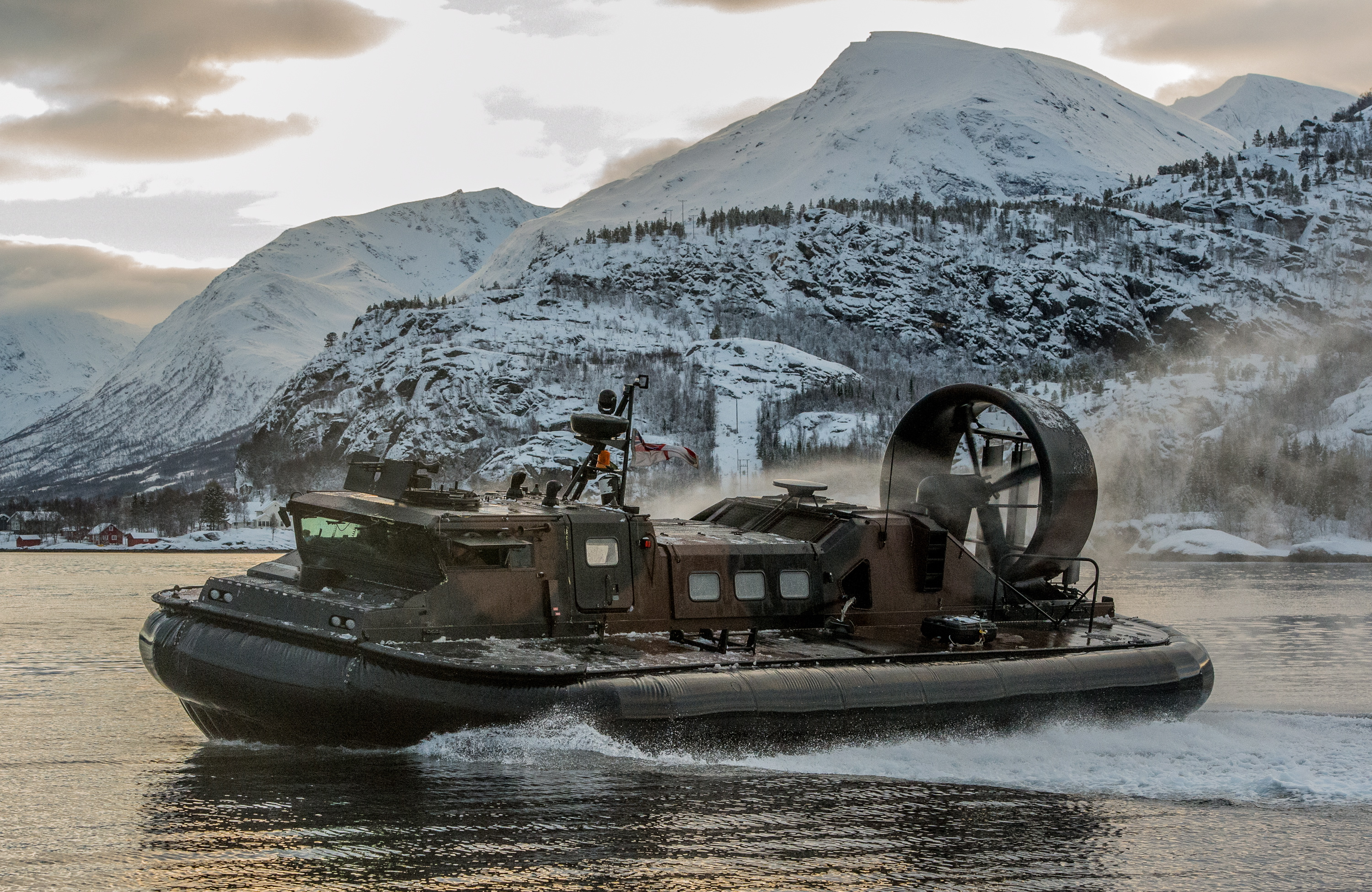
Royal Marines LCAC(L)

The Landing Craft Air Cushion (Light), or LCAC(L), is a small amphibious hovercraft able to transverse both land and water. Like all amphibious landing craft in the Royal Navy, they were operated by the Royal Marines to transport troops or equipment from ship to shore during an amphibious landing.

Four LCACs were in service up to the early 2020s, with pennant numbers C21, C22, C23 and C24. However, these craft were reported laid up as of 2023.

== 2000TDX ==
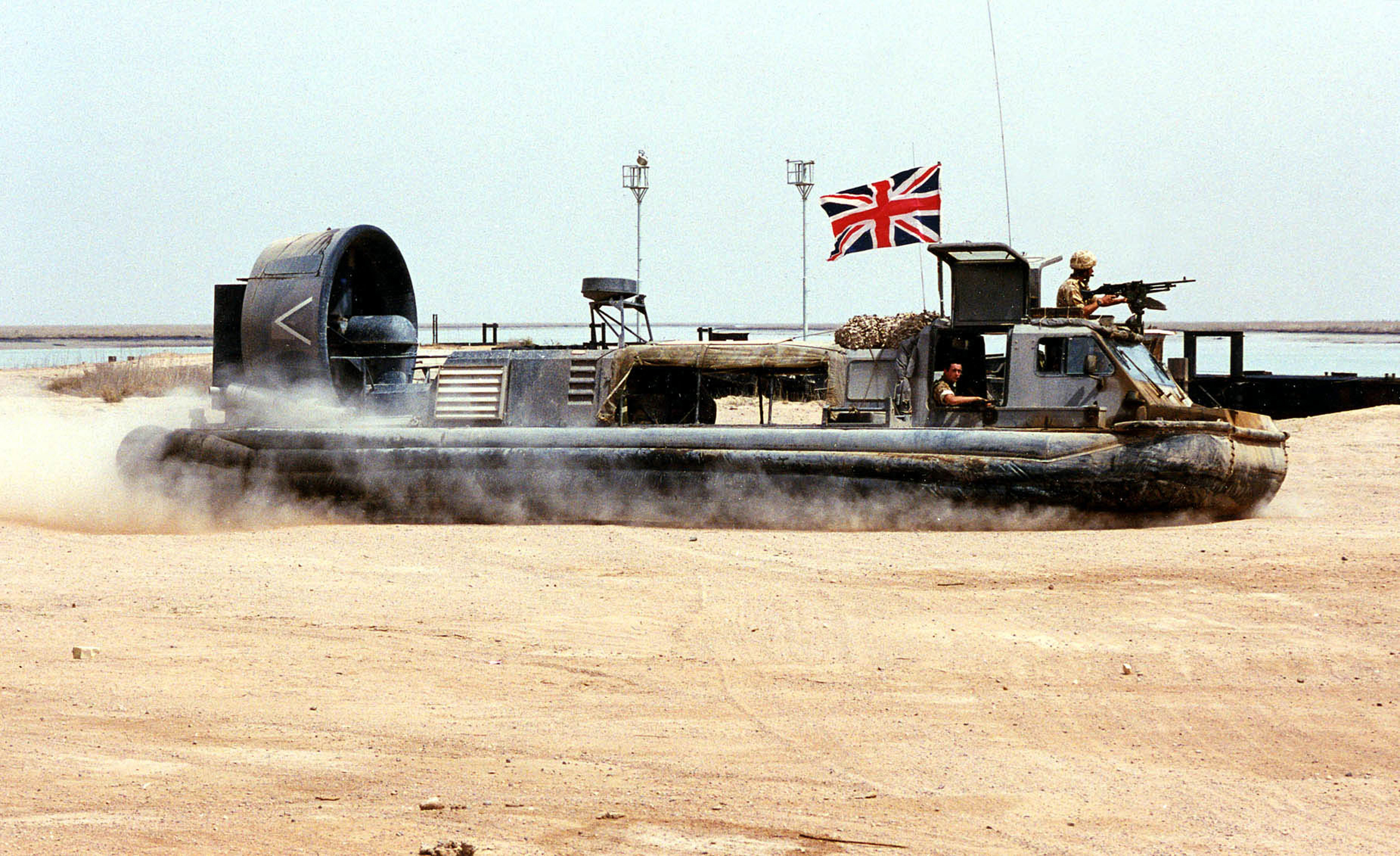
Royal Marine Hovercraft on Patrol in Iraq

The Griffon 2000TDX was the first LCAC(L) to enter service with the Royal Navy and Royal Marines, the added (L) indicates that it is an LCAC Light. The 2000TDX was based on the basic 2000TD model with modifications for military use. Due to the nature of the LCAC (being a hovercraft), they displace very little water despite their large size, they also produce next to no wake at high speed - this makes the LCAC more stealthy than traditional landing craft and with their powerful engines, much faster.

=== Specifications ===
The Landing Craft Air Cushion 2000TDX has the following specifications:

- Length: 13.4 m (44 ft 0 in)
- Width: 6.1 m (20 ft 0 in)
- Speed (full): 34 kn (63 km/h; 39 mph)
- Troops: 18 Royal Marines (2 crew, 16 fully equipped troops) or 2.2 tonnes.

== 2400TD ==
In 2008 Griffon Hoverwork won a contract to deliver four new 2400TD hovercraft in 2009 to replace the older 2000TD hovercraft. The 2400TD was developed from the existing 2000TD but was improved to have "increased obstacle clearance and hence better sea-keeping capability, as well as an increased payload capacity".

In 2019, Bland Group announced that Griffon Hoverwork had secured a 6.5-year contract with the Ministry of Defence to maintain small boats and the 2400TDs used by the Royal Marines. However, the 2400TD’s were reported laid up as of 2023. In 2025, it was reported that three of the craft had been transferred to the Pakistan Navy. Griffon Hoverwork still maintain a sizeable portion of the UK MoD small conventional vessels fleet however.

=== Specifications ===
The Landing Craft Air Cushion 2400TD has the following specifications:

- Length: 12.7 m (41 ft 8 in)
- Width: 6.8 m (22 ft 4 in)
- Speed (full): 34 kn (63 km/h; 39 mph)
- Troops: 18 Royal Marines (2 crew, 16 fully equipped troops) or 2.4 tonnes.

== See also ==
- List of active Royal Marines military watercraft
- Landing Craft Air Cushion
