= PNS Behr Paima =

History

Pakistan
- Builder: Mitsubishi Heavy Industries
- Laid down: 16 February 1982
- Launched: 7 July 1982 (Japan)
- Commissioned: 27 December 1982
- Home port: Karachi
- Identification: IMO number: 8125595; Callsign: AQPD
- Status: in active service

General characteristics
- Tonnage: 1,184 GT
- Length: 61.00 m
- Draught: 3.70 m (max)
- Speed: 13.9 kn
- Range: 5401 NM
- Endurance: 25 days

Behr Paima (Urdu: بحر پیما) is a hydrographic survey and Research vessel owned by Pakistan Navy.

Her keel was laid on 16 February 1982 and was launched on 7 July 1982 in Japan. The ship was handed over to Pakistan Navy on 27 December, same year. The ship was equipped with most modern surveying systems of the time. The hydrographic systems have been upgraded since then from time to time and hence are parallel with modern trends and techniques available in the world. Most of the oceanographic equipments are, however, of the original outfit.

== Design and development ==
The initial conceptual work of Behr Paima was started in Pakistan Council of Scientific and Industrial Research (PCSIR) when the PCSIR scientists independently started the work in the PCSIR Karachi Laboratories. The project was financed by the Government of Japan and the vessel was constructed in Japan. The ship was launched in 1982 and later handed over to the Pakistan Navy in December 1982. The first commanding officer of the ship was Commander Iftikhar Ahmed Abbasi(Hydrographer), who sailed the ship all the way from Japan to Pakistan, extensive trials of the ship were conducted in Japan by Commander Abbasi and his team of highly qualified surveyors. Its induction gave Pakistan not only technological edge in the region, such as forecasting accurately weather, storms, and until today saving hundreds and thousands of lives both on shore and on sea before any major disaster could occur. The ship also helped Pakistan to survey its sea as an independent and sovereign country and not dependent on any other foreign country to conduct survey for us, who would censor any important, sensitive information vital for Pakistan but due to Commander Abbasi's hard work at that time, who trained highly qualified surveyors for Pakistan and acquired modern technology, Pakistan was able to actively keep a vigilant eye on Indian Navy aggression in the region too and at the same time offer Survey services to the neighbouring countries with full confidence. Pakistani nation today is saving billions of rupees since then that could have been paid to foreign organizations. The ship has the capability to survey the sea bed and gather vital information for ships, but also to locate the mineral resources, such as oil, gas, etc....The ship is guarding the sea frontiers of Pakistan day and night against any future aggression from India.

== Instruments and equipment ==
The vessel has six deck winches and three laboratories equipped with a range of survey equipments and instruments. Hydrographic equipment includes variety of Differential Global Positioning System, Electronic Chart Display and Information System, Microwave Positioning systems, Dual Frequency Echo Sounders, Multibeam and Side Scan Sonars, Radio Tide Gauges, Profilers, Current Meters, CTD and Hydrographic data acquisition and processing software. Additionally there are Oceanographic and Geophysical research instruments. There are two Survey Boats equipped with DGPS and survey equipment to facilitate the surveying of shallow and inshore waters.

== Survey work ==
The ship, since its induction, has carried-out extensive survey of Pakistan's coastal areas on different scales. The ship partially surveyed the south-eastern sea-front of Pakistan that comprises Indus River Delta creeks. However, sea area west and south of Karachi has been thoroughly surveyed. The ship also provided valuable data for building of Jinnah Naval Base channel in Ormara. Pakistan's deep water port at Gwadar was also planned based on data rendered by the ship. The corresponding series of charts on different scales have been published for the entire coast of Pakistan based on ships surveyed data. The ship has also conducted dredging surveys, wreck search, north markings, tidal data collections, and detached surveys etc.

== See also ==
- Pakistan Council of Scientific and Industrial Research
- Government of Pakistan
