= Spanish submarine Tramontana =

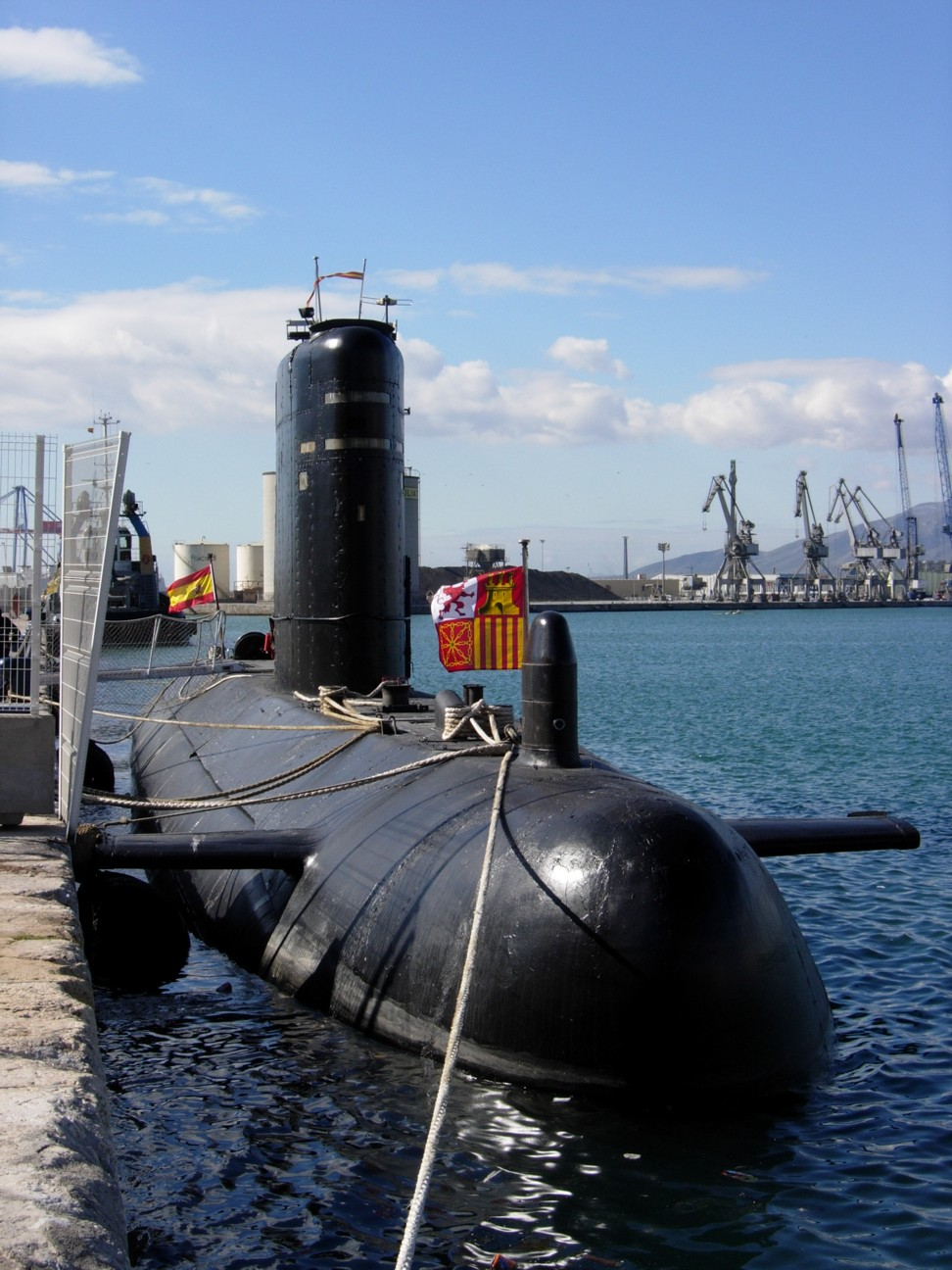
- Tramontana in the port of Malaga in 2005.

History

Spain
- Name: Tramontana
- Builder: Bazán, Cartagena, Spain
- Launched: 30 November 1984
- Commissioned: 1985
- Decommissioned: 16 February 2024
- Identification: S74
- Status: Decommissioned

General characteristics
- Class & type: Agosta-class submarine
- Displacement: 1,500 long tons (1,524 t) surfaced; 1,760 long tons (1,788 t) submerged
- Length: 67 m (219 ft 10 in)
- Beam: 6 m (19 ft 8 in)
- Speed: 12 knots (22 km/h; 14 mph) surfaced; 20.5 knots (38.0 km/h; 23.6 mph) submerged; 10.5 knots (19.4 km/h; 12.1 mph) submerged (snort)
- Test depth: 300 m (984 ft 3 in)
- Complement: 5 officers; 36 men
- Sensors & processing systems: Thomson CSF DRUA 33 Radar; Thomson Sintra DSUV 22; DUUA 2D Sonar; DUUA 1D Sonar; DUUX 2 Sonar; DSUV 62A towed array
- Armament: SM 39 Exocet; 4 × 550 millimetres (22 in) bow torpedo tubes; ECAN L5 Mod 3 & ECAN Fl7 Mod 2 nuclear torpedoes

Tramontana (S-74) was an Agosta-class submarine built for the Spanish Navy by Bazán at Cartagena, Spain. She served from 1985 to February 2024, when she was decommissioned.

== History ==
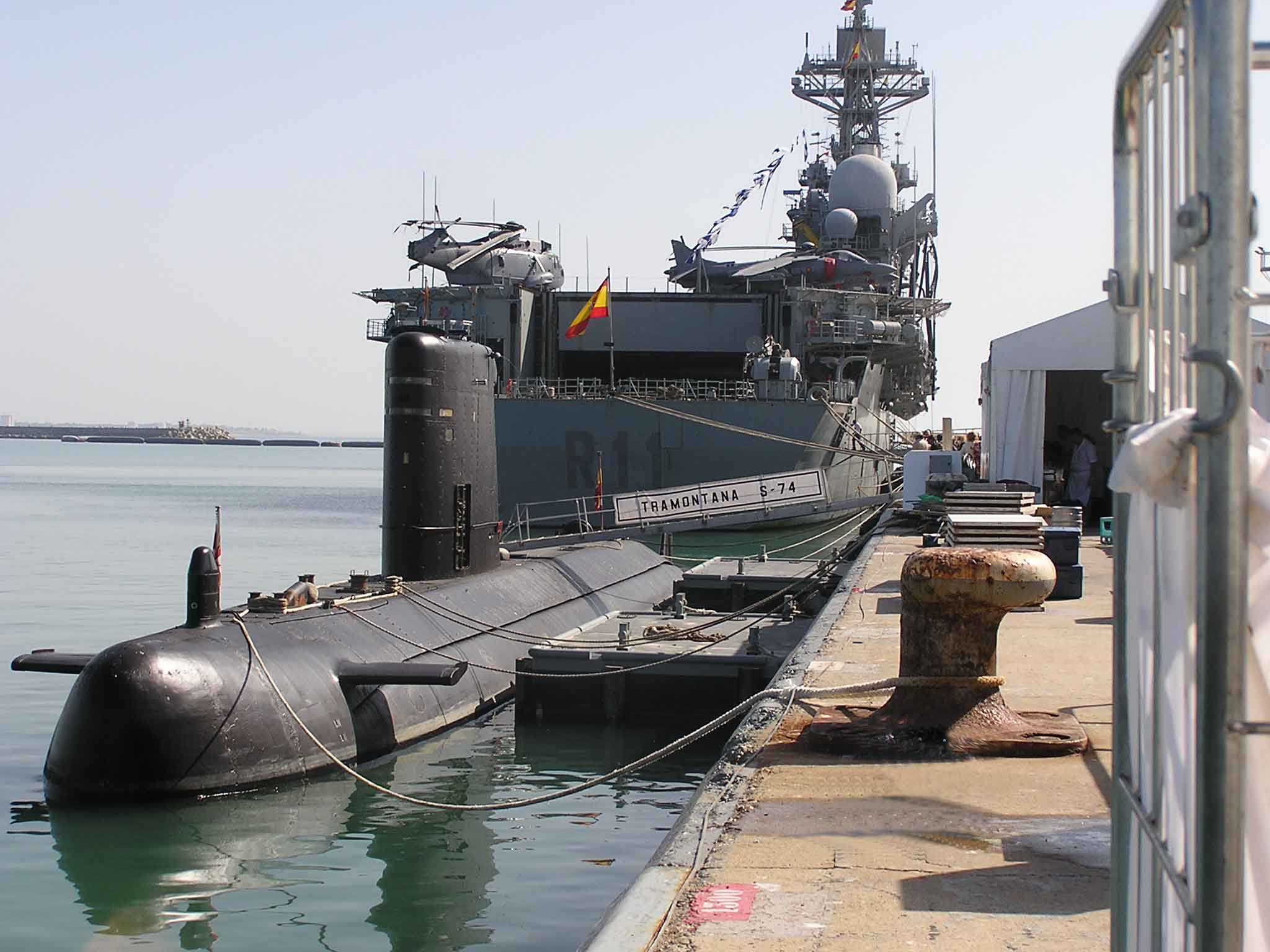
Tramontana moored at the Naval Station Rota, in the background the already retired aircraft carrier Príncipe de Asturias.

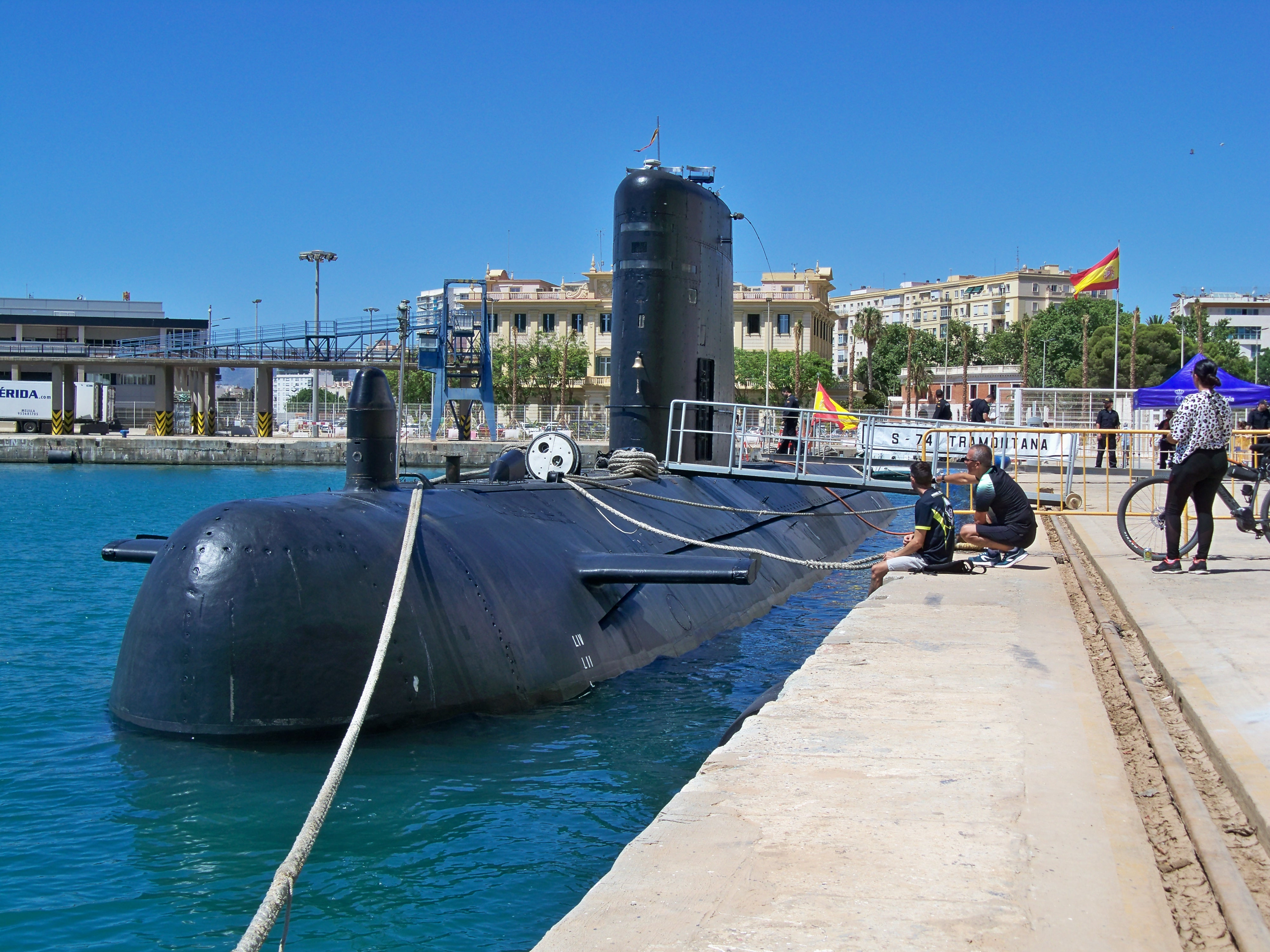
Tramontana in Málaga in 2022.

The submarine was launched in 1984 and commissioned in 1985.

It was involved in a collision during naval exercises near Cartagena, in 2001 as well as the Perejil Island crisis in 2002.

It was deployed as part of the Spanish contribution to the multi-national task force enforcing the United Nations Security Council Resolution 1973 "to take all necessary measures to protect civilians under threat of attack" in Libya on March 22, 2011.

Between 19 and 23 March 2012, the submarine participated in the INSTREX-12 exercise, along with 11 other ships and the Portuguese Tridente-class submarine, Arpao.

On 24 May 2013, Pedro Argüelles, Secretary of State for Defence, declared at the Congress of Deputies that shipbuilding company Navantia would review the technical delays of the S-80 Submarine, which had previously been discarded.

The Armada decommissioned the Tramontana in a ceremony on February 16, 2024.

== Media ==
Part of the movie Navy SEALS was filmed aboard the submarine in November 1989.

== See also ==
- List of submarines of the Spanish Navy
