= Agosta-class submarine =

French diesel-electric submarine class

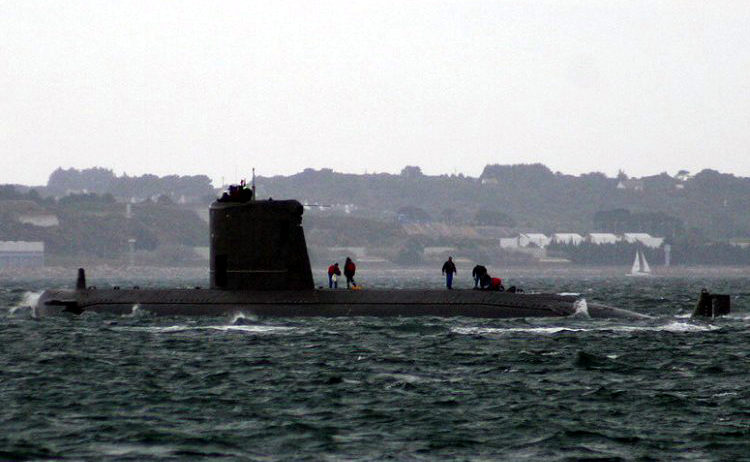
- French Agosta-70 submarine Ouessant at Brest in 2005

Class overview
- Operators: French Navy (former); Royal Malaysian Navy (former); Spanish Navy; Pakistan Navy
- Preceded by: Daphné class
- Succeeded by: Scorpène class; Rubis class
- Subclasses: Agosta 90B
- Built: 1977–2006
- In commission: 1977 – Active in service in Spain and Pakistan
- Planned: 13
- Completed: 13
- Active: 6
- Retired: 7
- Scrapped: 5
- Preserved: 1

General characteristics
- Displacement: 1,500 long tons (1,524 t) surfaced; 1,760 long tons (1,788 t) submerged (France, Spain); 2,050 long tons (2,083 t) submerged (Pakistan)
- Length: 67 m (219 ft 10 in) (France, Spain); 76 m (249 ft 4 in) (Pakistan)
- Beam: 6 m (19 ft 8 in)
- Speed: 12 knots (22 km/h; 14 mph) surfaced; 20.5 knots (38.0 km/h; 23.6 mph) submerged; 10.5 knots (19.4 km/h; 12.1 mph) submerged (snorkeling)
- Range: 8,500 miles (13,679 km)
- Test depth: 300 m (980 ft) (France, Spain); 350 m (1,150 ft) (Pakistan)
- Complement: 5 officers; 36 men
- Sensors & processing systems: Thomson CSF DRUA 33 Radar; Thomson Sintra DSUV 22; DUUA 2D Sonar; DUUA 1D Sonar; DUUX 2 Sonar; DSUV 62A towed array
- Armament: SM 39 Exocet; 4 × 550 mm (22 in) bow torpedo tubes (12 reloads on Khalid-class, 16 reloads on Hashmat class); ECAN L5 Mod 3 & ECAN F17 Mod 2 torpedoes

The Agosta-class submarine is a class of diesel-electric attack submarine developed and constructed by the French DCNS in the 1970s to succeed the Daphné-class submarines. The submarines have served in the French Navy as well as exported to the navies of Spain and Pakistan. It also used by Royal Malaysian Navy for the training purpose. They were replaced in French service by the Rubis-class nuclear attack submarines but are still in active service with the navies of Spain and Pakistan. The French Navy grouped this model of submarine in their most capable class as an océanique, meaning "ocean-going."

The Agosta class is named for its lead unit, Agosta, which in turn was named for the Battle of Augusta (French: Agosta) of 22 April 1676.

== Ships ==
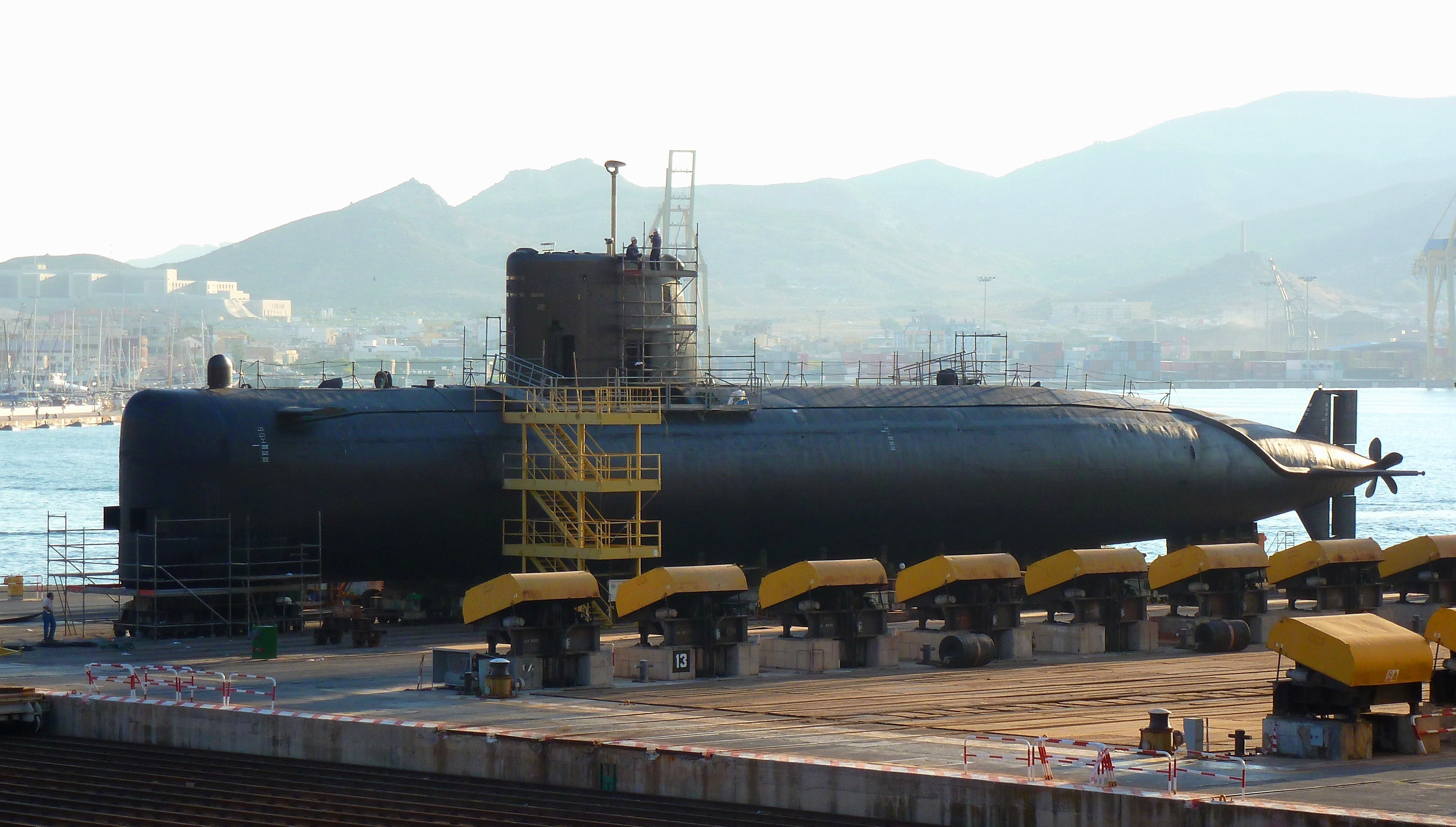
Mistral (S-73)

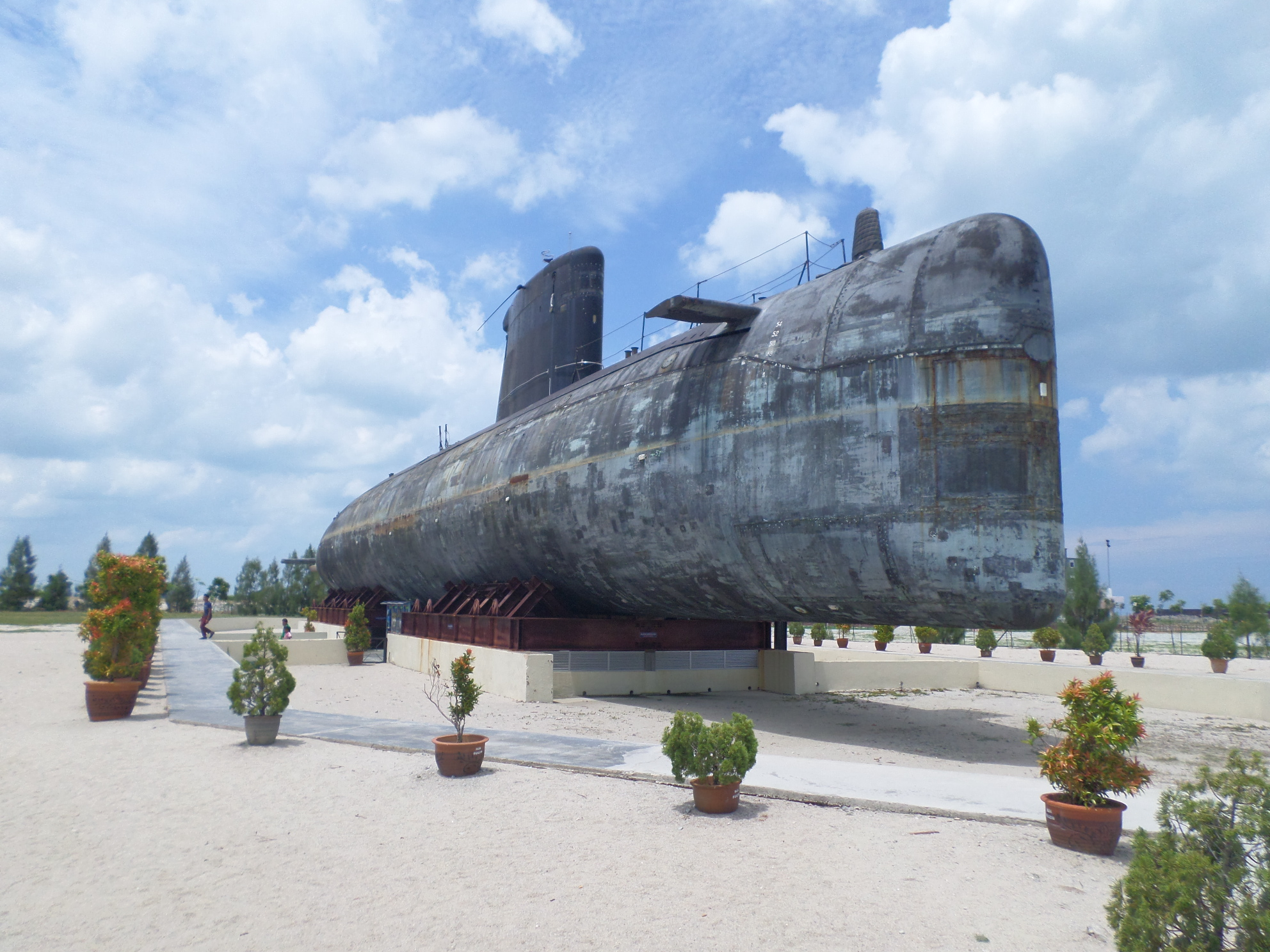
Submarine Museum, ex-Ouessant (S623)

=== French Navy ===
built by Arsenal de Cherbourg

- Agosta (S 620) – Completed 1977 – Decommissioned 1997
- Bévéziers (S 621) – Completed 1977 – Decommissioned 1998
- La Praya (S 622) – Completed 1978 – Decommissioned 2000
- Ouessant (S 623) – Completed 1978 – Decommissioned 2001 (transferred to Royal Malaysian Navy).

=== Spanish Navy ===
built by Cartagena dockyard

- Galerna (S 71) – Completed 1983 – In service
- Siroco (S 72) – Completed 1983 – Decommissioned 2012
- Mistral (S 73) – Completed 1985 – Decommissioned 2020
- Tramontana (S 74) – Completed 1985 – Decommissioned 2024

=== Pakistan Navy ===
- PNS/M Hashmat (S135) – Agosta-70, commissioned by PN in 1979, originally named Astrant
- PNS/M Hurmat (S136) – Agosta-70, commissioned by PN in 1980, originally named Adventurous
- PNS Khalid (S137) – Agosta-90B, commissioned by PN in 1999
- PNS Saad (S138) – Agosta-90B, commissioned by PN in 2003
- PNS Hamza (S139) – Agosta-90B, commissioned by PN in 2008

On 10 September 1974, South Africa announced to expand its submarine arm by entering in defence talks with France to acquire the Agosta-70-class submarines. South African Prime Minister P. W. Botha engaged in discussion with acquiring two Agosta-70-class submarines with French President Valéry d'Estaing, and had Capt. L. J. Woodburne as the project-manager of acquisition of Agosta-70 program in South African Navy. Dubigeon-Normandie, the French contractor, built two Agosta-70 class submarine. However, France denied to order of delivery to South African Navy following the implementation of Resolution 418 (an arms embargo) by the United Nations.

The Agosta-70A class submarines were eventually offered to Pakistan, which Pakistan acquired for its military in 1978 and commissioned in Pakistan Navy in 1979. In Pakistan Navy, there are known as Hashmat class.

In 1983–1985, the class of submarines were deployed in Arabian Sea to deter the actions of the larger Indian Navy in seaborne theatre. As part of the Cold War operation, they were deployed in the Arabian Sea and later embarked on being deployed on long-range mission to test depth and submerged endurance in Indian Ocean.

== Variants ==
The Agosta-90B-class submarines is an improved version with modern systems, better battery with longer endurance, deeper diving capability, lower acoustic cavitation and better automatic control (reducing crew from 54 to 36). It can be equipped with the MESMA air-independent propulsion (AIP) system. It is capable of carrying a combined load up to 16 torpedoes, SM39 Exocet, and seaborne nuclear cruise missiles.

The submarines were built through the technology transfer by France to Pakistan that resulted in complicated and lengthy negotiations between the Benazir Bhutto government and the Mitterrand administration in 1992, and signed with the Chirac administration in 1992. The Agosta–90Bs were chosen over the British Upholder/Victoria class and the project was initially aimed at $520 million but the programme of technology transfer cost nearly $950 million ($1.95 billion in 2025), for which France first provided loans that were paid in five to six years. In 2000, France gave Pakistan the licence to offer commercial production of the submarines to potential customers.

Silhouette of Rubis class, before rebuild.

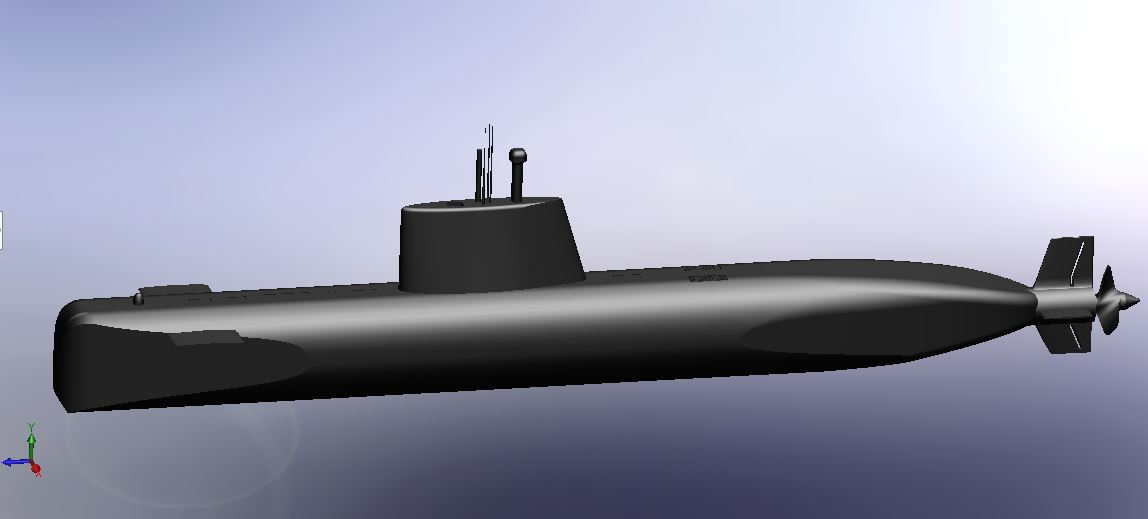
Silhouette after Agosta-90B, after rebuild.

The SM39 was test-fired from a Khalid-class submarine in 2001.

- PNS/M Khalid (S137) – built in France by DCN Cherbourg, completed in 1999
- PNS/M Saad (S138) – assembled in Pakistan with French assistance, completed in 2002
- PNS/M Hamza (S139) – built in Pakistan with French assistance, commissioned 28 September 2008

The Agosta-90B boats strikingly similar features to that of Rubis-class nuclear submarine as their hulls are of single-hull construction made of 80 HLES high elasticity steel and the forward diving planes are situated high on the conning tower.

In March 2018, DCNS, the original builder lost a bidding competition to the Turkish firm STM, for mid-life upgrades to the 3 class subs. The upgrades will replace "the submarine’s entire sonar suite, periscope systems, command and control system, radar and electronic support systems. HAVELSAN- [Turkey’s state-controlled military software company] and ASELSAN [Turkish defense contractor]-made systems will also be exported as part of the project.” As well as install a "SharpEye low probability-of-intercept (LPI) radar system aboard" and "make modifications on the pressure hull, the most critical structure in a submarine, by carrying out system-to-system and platform-to-system integrations for various systems, to be provided by local and foreign companies.”

== See also ==
- List of submarine classes in service

Equivalent submarines of the same era

- Sauro class
- Santa Cruz class
- Type 209
- Näcken class
