= PNS Khalid =

French-Pakistani military submarine

PNS Khalid (S137)
History

Pakistan
- Name: PNS Khalid
- Namesake: Khālid
- Ordered: 21 September 1994
- Builder: DCNS, Cherbourg in France
- Laid down: 15 July 1995
- Launched: 18 December 1998
- Sponsored by: Pervez Musharraf
- Commissioned: 6 September 1999
- In service: 1999–present
- Home port: Jinnah Naval Base
- Identification: S137
- Status: In service

General characteristics
- Class & type: Agosta 90Bravo/Khalid-class submarine
- Displacement: 1,570 long tons (1,595 t) (Surface); 2,050 long tons (2,083 t) (Submerged)
- Length: 249.4 ft (76.0 m)
- Beam: 22.3 ft (6.8 m)
- Draught: 27.0 ft (8.2 m); 26.7 ft (8.1 m)
- Installed power: 2 × Jeumont-Schneider alternators producing: 4,600 hp (3,400 kW).
- Propulsion: 2 × SEMT Pielstick 16 PA4 V 185 VG AIP MESMA: 3,600 hp (2,700 kW), 1 × shaft.
- Speed: 12.0 knots (22.2 km/h; 13.8 mph) (surface); 20.5 knots (38.0 km/h; 23.6 mph) (submerged)
- Range: 8,500 miles (13,700 km) at 9 knots (17 km/h; 10 mph)
- Endurance: 150 Days
- Test depth: 1,968.5 ft (600 m)
- Complement: 36 (7 officers, 29 enlisted)
- Sensors & processing systems: Towed array sonar
- Electronic warfare & decoys: ESM: Thomson-CSF DR-3000U; intercept.; Low-probability-of-intercept
- Armament: 4 × 533 mm (21 in) bow torpedo tubes Up to 16 F17P Mod 2 torpedoes; SSM: Exocet SM 39; SLCM: Babur–III; DM2A4 SeaHake mod 4; Stonefish naval mines

PNS/M Khalid (S-137) is a diesel-electric fast-attack submarine equipped with an air–independent propulsion system and the lead ship of her class active since her commissioning in the Navy in 1999.

Based on the Agosta 90Bravo/Khalid-class design, she was the first submarine that was first designed and constructed in Cherbourg in France by the French contractor, the DCNS for the Pakistan Navy, as part of contract for three Agosta–90B submarines signed on 21 September 1994. Khalid, according to the Pakistan Navy, is the forerunner of her class and capable for her long-range missions in the Indian Ocean.

== Construction and design development ==
After the series of complicated and lengthy negotiations between the governments of Pakistan and France, the Pakistan Navy placed an order for the submarine in September 1992 with confirmation being approved on 21 September 1994. She was designed and constructed by the French contractor, DCNS, in Cherbourg in France and was laid down on 15 July 1995.

Her launch took place on 18 December 1998 in Cherbourg, and underwent through several sea trials by the French Navy before being sent to Karachi, Sindh in Pakistan. The hull is made of 80 HLES high elasticity steel, a similar material used in Rubis-class nuclear submarines, allowing the submarine to give greater depth in sea. Furthermore, the automatic control system and automation further reduces the need of crew, restricted her military staff to 36 personnel.

On 6 September 1999, she was commissioned in the Navy with Chairman joint chiefs, General Pervez Musharraf, witnessing the commissioning ceremony and presented the submarine with her colors.

She was named after Khalid ibn al-Walid, one of the most respected and successful military commanders of Islam. About her commissioning, the Indian naval chief, Admiral Sushil Kumar, reportedly quoted that the "Khalid had given an edge over India."

The commissioning of the submarine was a watershed event in the country with the political elite giving credit to former Prime Minister Benazir Bhutto. Khalid was officially inducted in the Navy on 21 December 1999.

== Upgrades ==
In 2011, she underwent with overhauling, and retrofitted her propulsion system with the air-independent propulsion (AIP) systems by the technicians at the KSEW Ltd.

On 6 March 2018, the DCNS, its original builder, lost the bidding competition with the Turkish firm, STM, for its refitting and upgradation of her weapon system, combat control system, missile rooms, and periscope upgrades, and is slated to return to her active service in 2020 after returning from Turkey.

On 25 January 2023, upgrades on the submarine were completed and she was delivered to the Pakistan Navy.

== See also ==
- Nuclear submarine
- Scorpène-class submarine – a class of submarine that uses the similar technology to the Agosta 90B
