= List of beaches in Pakistan =

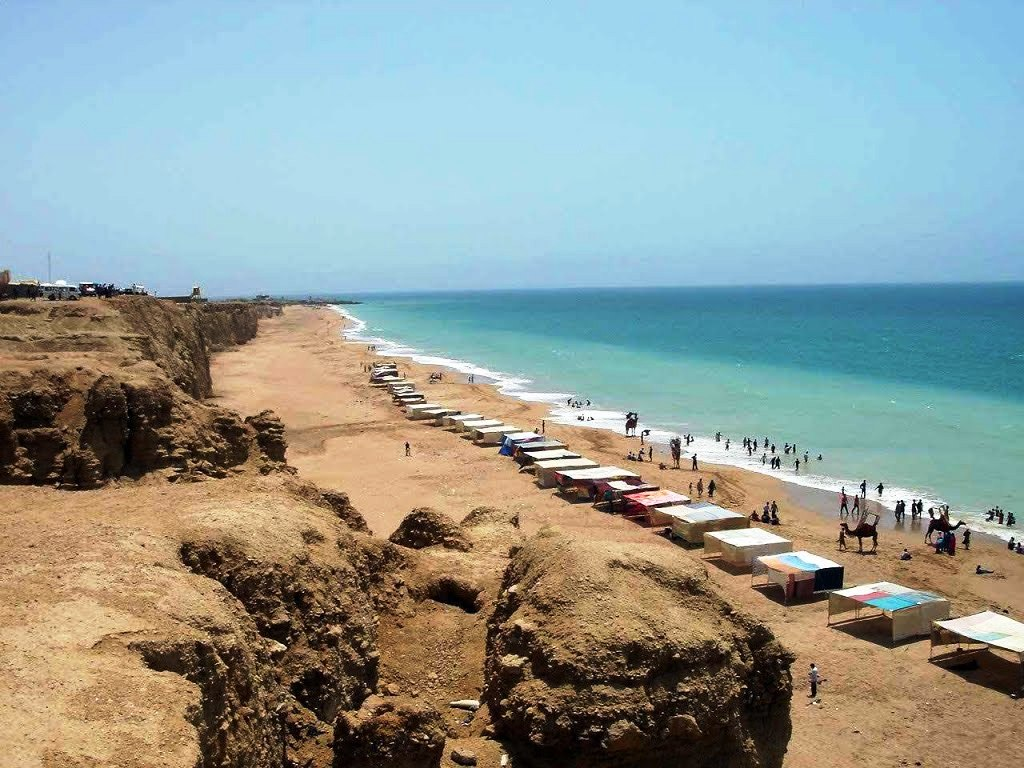
Hawke's Bay Beach in Sindh

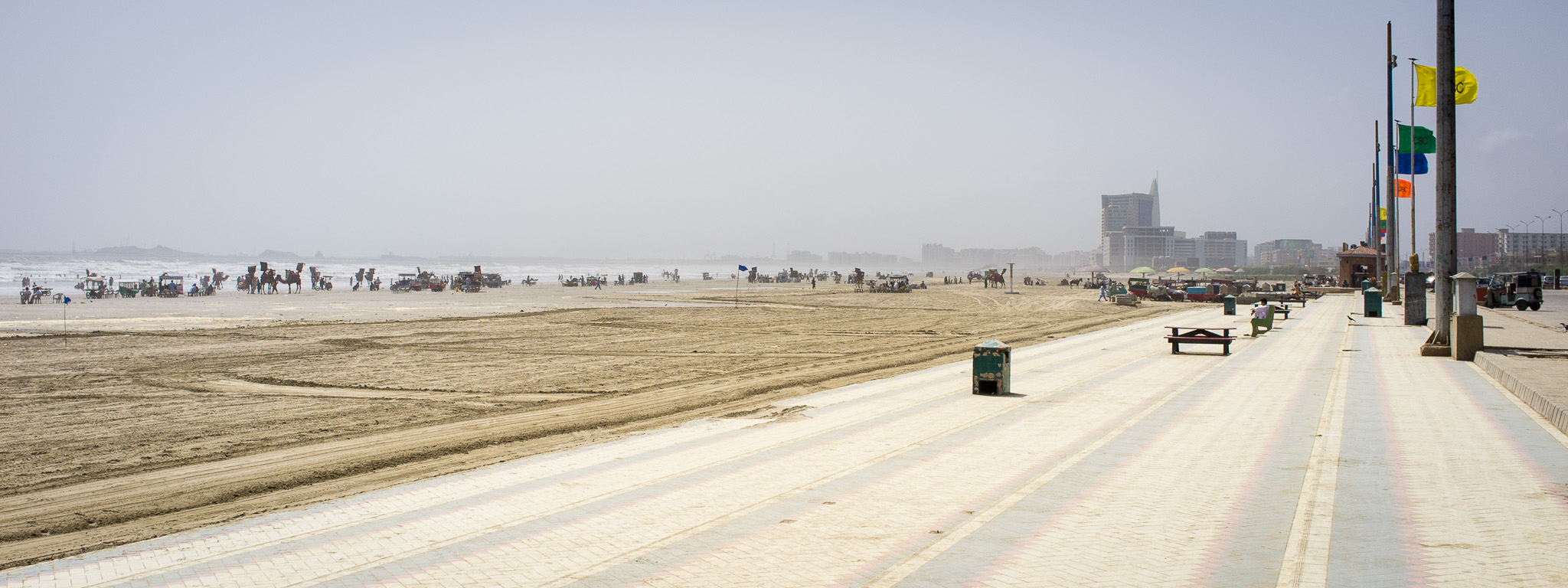
Clifton Beach in Sindh

This is a list of beaches in Pakistan (Urdu: پاکستان کے ساحل) which are notable. Pakistan's southern coastline meets the Arabian Sea, running along the provinces of Sindh and Balochistan.

== Sindh ==
Karachi

- Clifton Beach
- French Beach
- Hawke's Bay
- Ibrahim Hyderi
- Korangi Creek
- Mubarak Goth
- Nathia Gali Beach
- Paradise Point
- Russian Beach
- Sandspit Beach
- Turtle Beach
- Tushan Beach
- Cape Monze
- Sunhera Beach
- Devil's Point
- Manora Beach
- Blue Sea Resort

== Balochistan ==
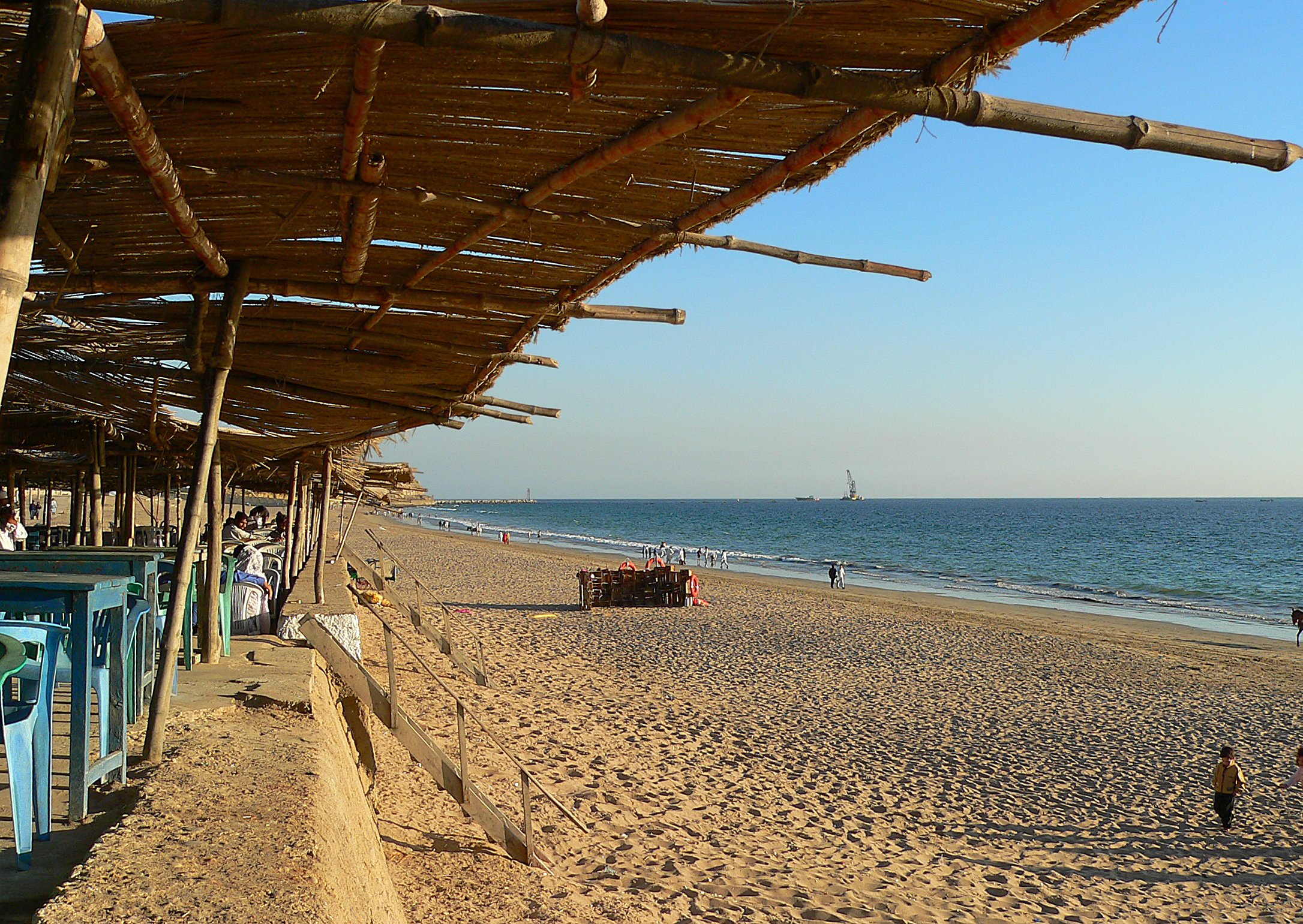
Manora Beach in Sindh

Gaddani

- Gadani Beach

Gwadar

- Gwadar East Bay beach
- Gwadar West Bay beach
- Pishukan beach
- Surbandar beach

Jiwani

- Ganz beach
- Jiwani beach

Ormara

- Ormara East Bay beach
- Ormara West Bay beach
- Ormara Turtle Beaches
- Kund Malir beach

Sonmiani

- Sonmiani Beach
