= Kund Malir =

Arabian sea beach in Balochistan, Pakistan

- Beach
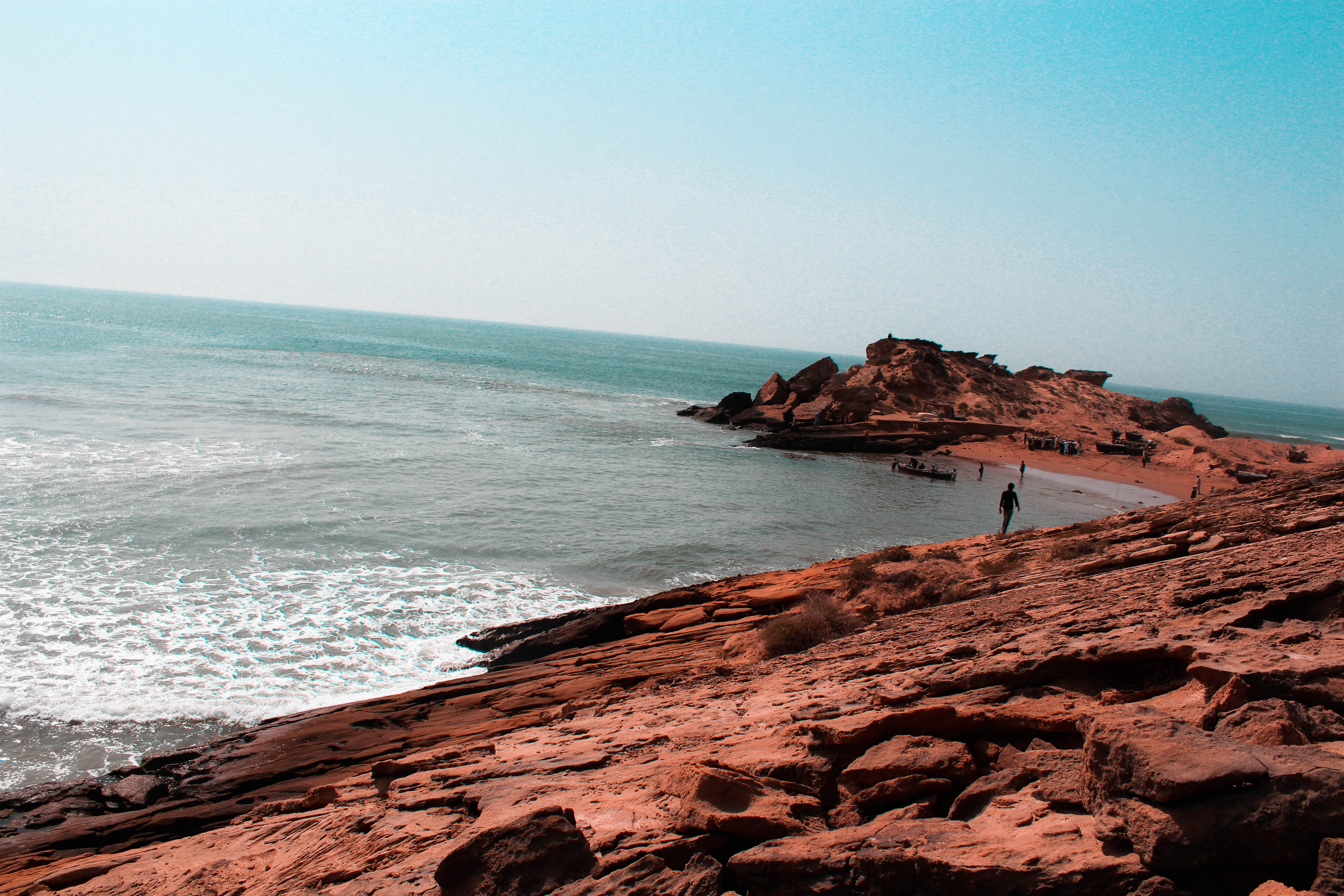
- View of Kund Malir Beach

- Location within Balochistan, Pakistan Location within Pakistan
- Coordinates: 25.3954°N 65.4657°E
- Location: Hingol National Park, Pakistan

Kund Malir is a beach in Balochistan, Pakistan located in Hingol National Park. It is located about 150 kilometres (93 mi) from Zero-Point on Makran Coastal Highway. Hingol National Park is one of the largest national parks in Pakistan. It is located 236.8 kilometres (147.1 mi) west of Karachi, the largest city of Pakistan. The drive between Kund Malir and Ormara is known for being scenic, and traverses a rural part of the country. There are estimated to be 11 active mud volcanoes in Kund Malir.

After passing Zero Point, there are no food or fuel facilities available along the route. Kund Malir is considered to be one of the most beautiful beaches in the world. The beach was added to the list of Asia's 50 Most Beautiful Beaches in 2018.

Due to increase in tourism, some of the mobile networks, including Ufone, have established service to provide coverage in this rural region. Several tour companies have expanded their services to help people access and explore this region. Kund Malir is a popular weekend picnic and daytrip destination for people from Karachi and interior Sindh. The site is unique and offers sweeping views of the mountains, ocean, and desert.

== Religious Significance ==
The prominent Hindu temple Hinglaj Mata Mandir is located in Kund Malir.

== Gallery ==
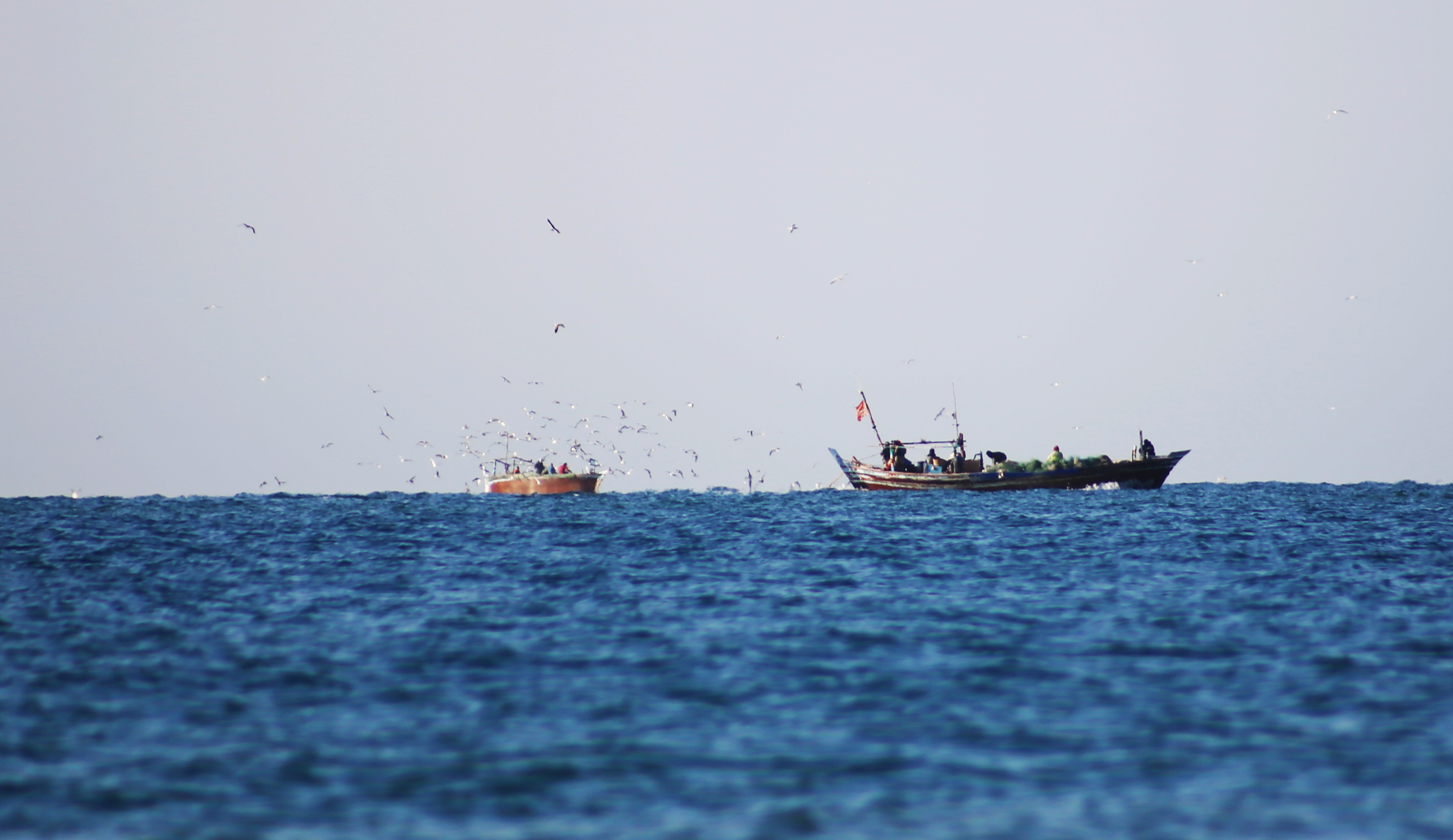
Fishing boat near Kund Malir Beach

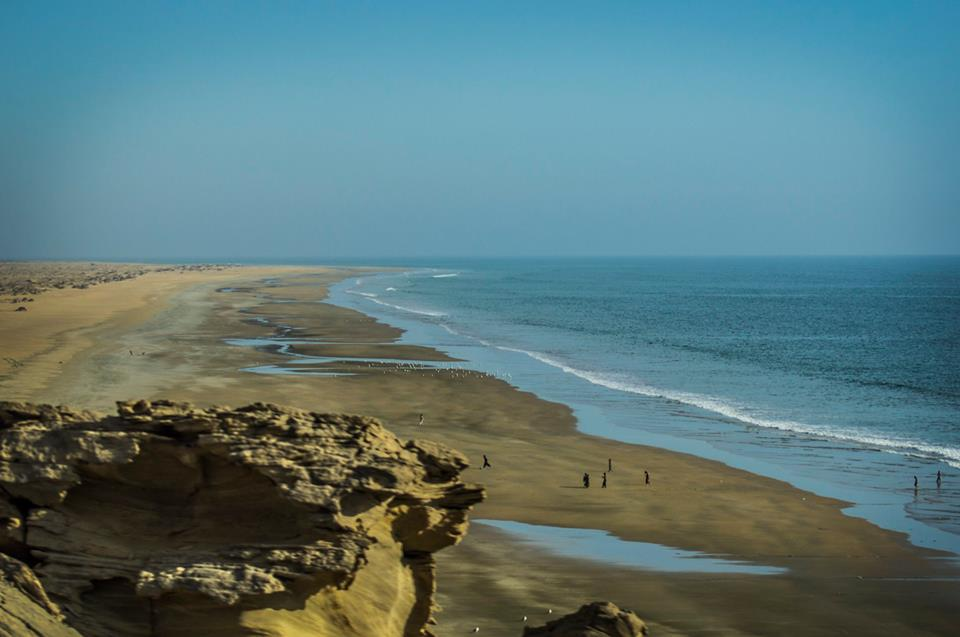
View of Kund Malir Beach

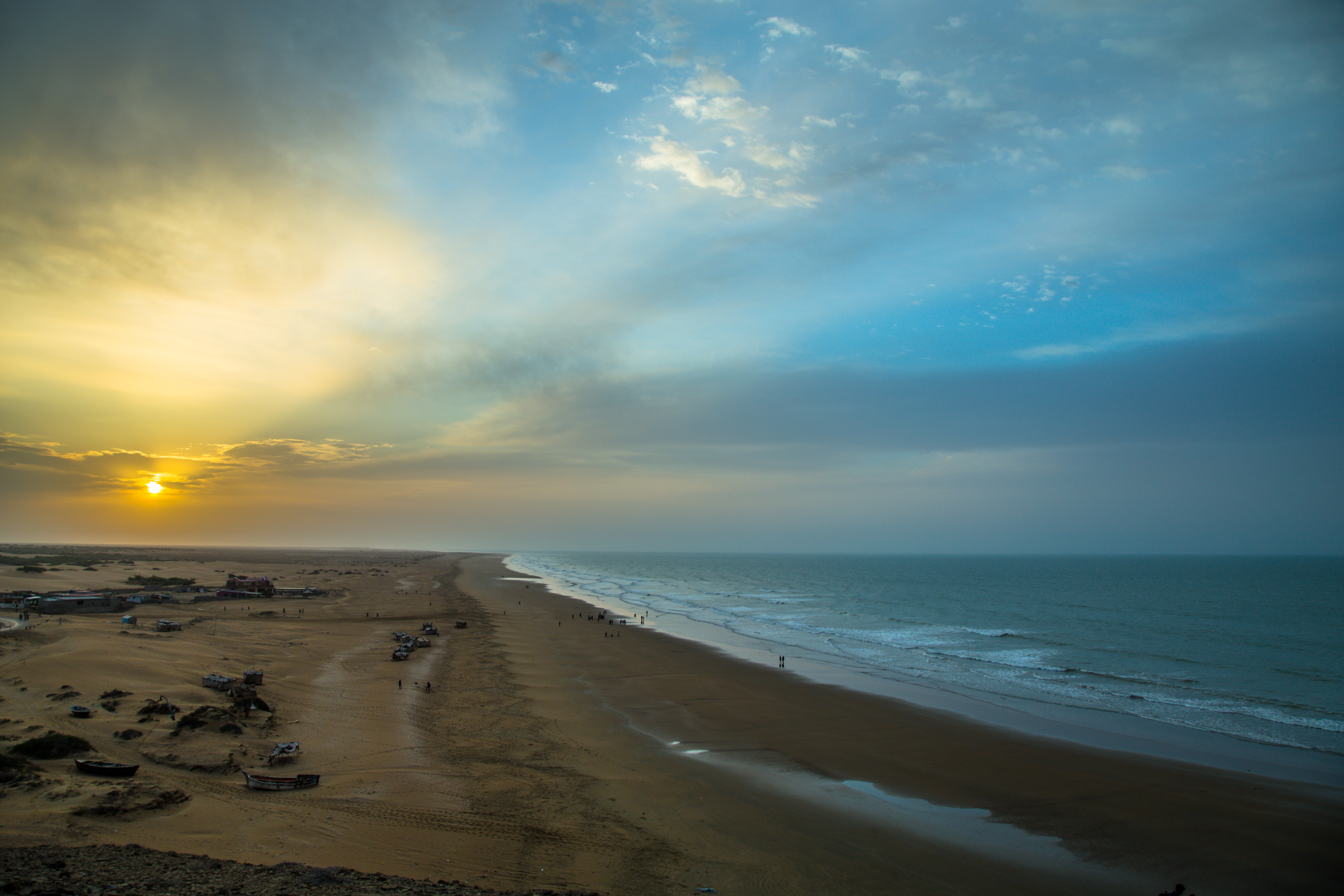
Scenic view of sunset at Kund Malir Beach

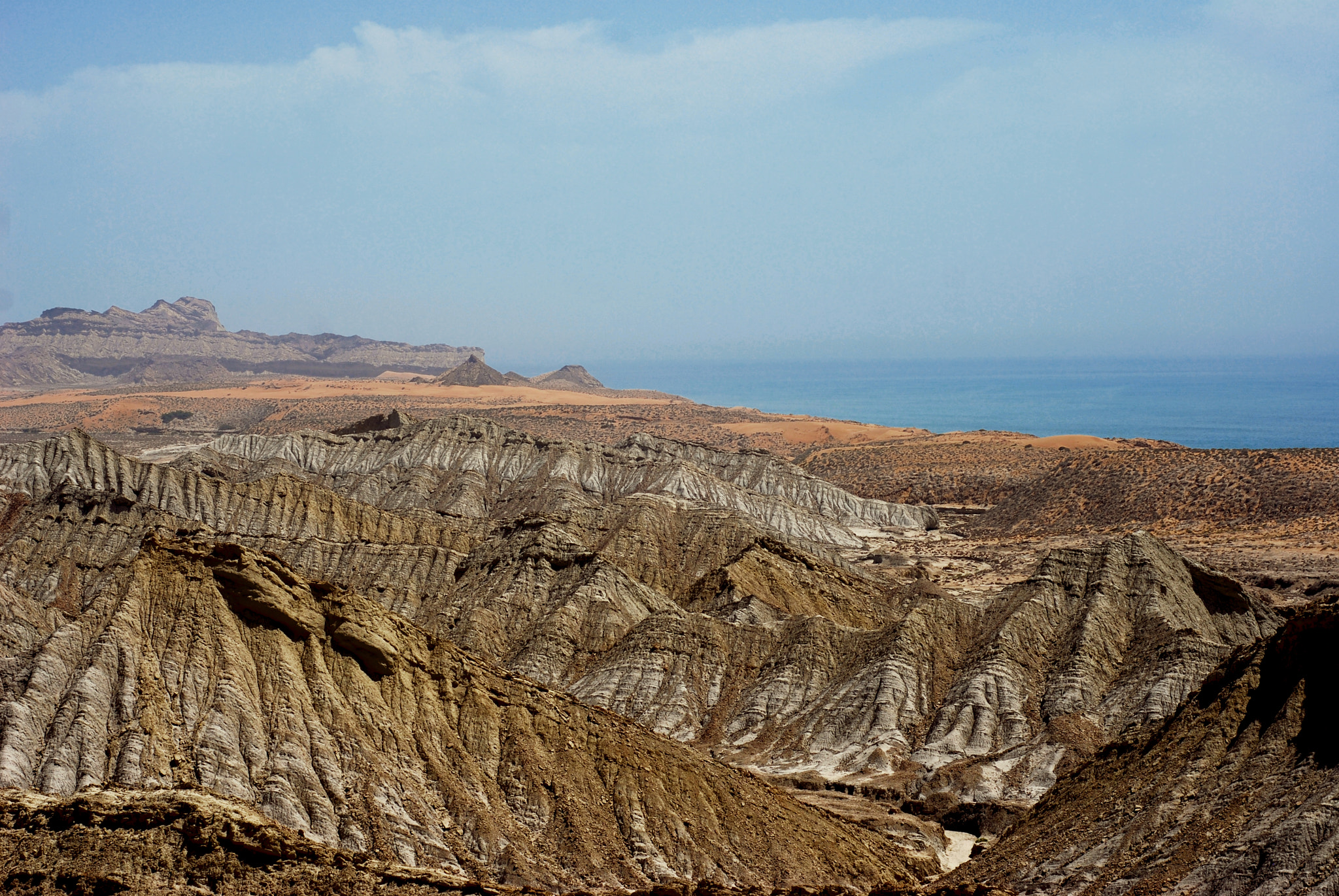
Dry mountains with adjoining Kund Malir Beach

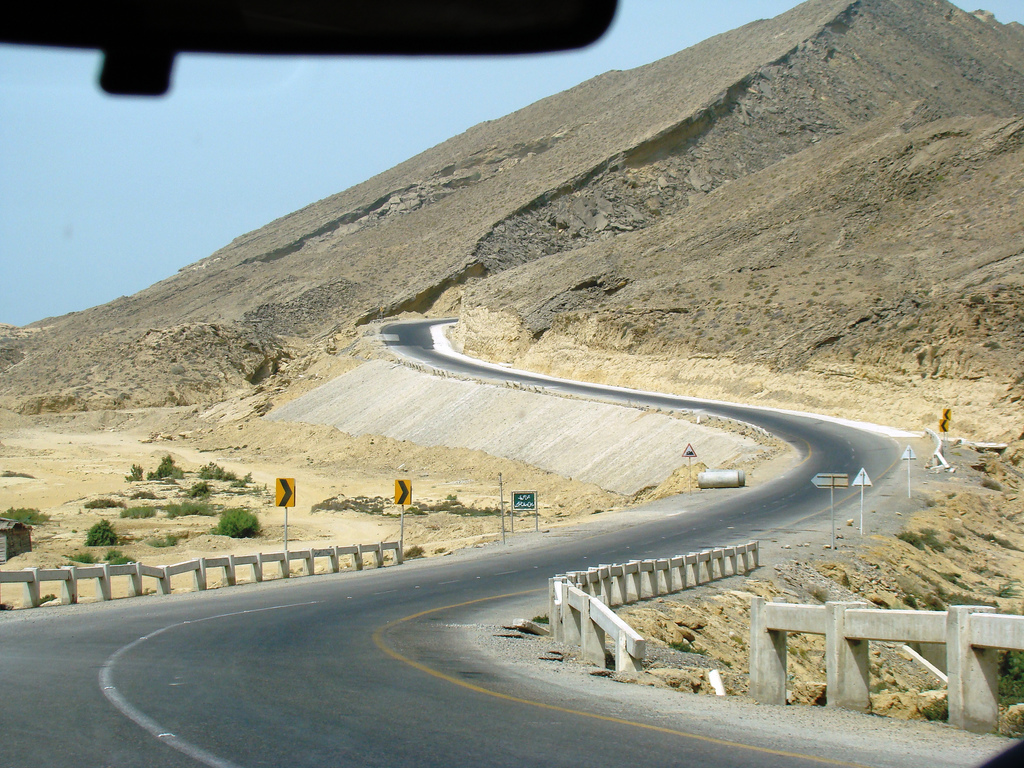
Makran Coastal Highway near Kund Malir beach

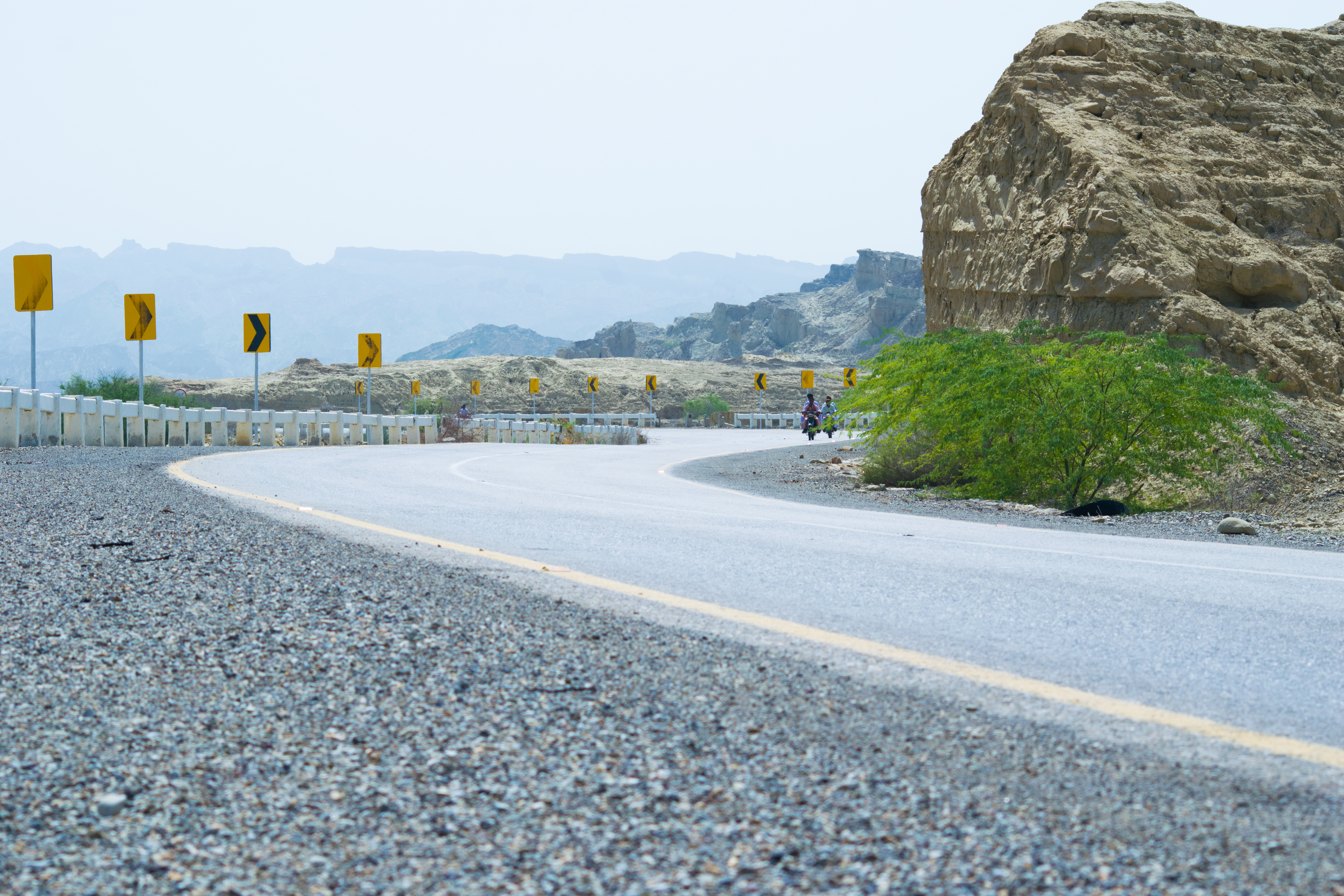
Makran Coastal Highway near Kund Malir beach

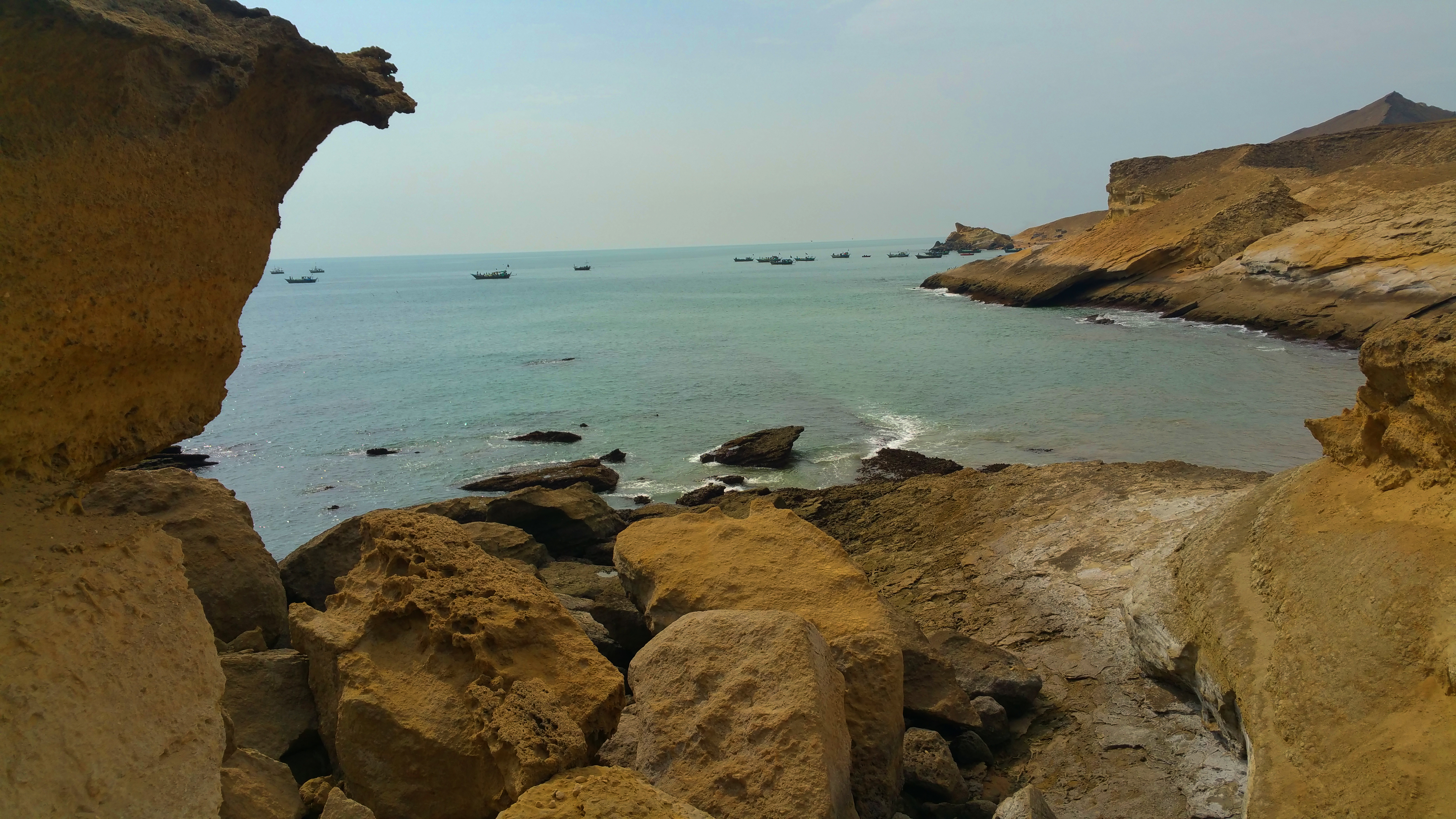
Big rocks at Kund Malir Beach

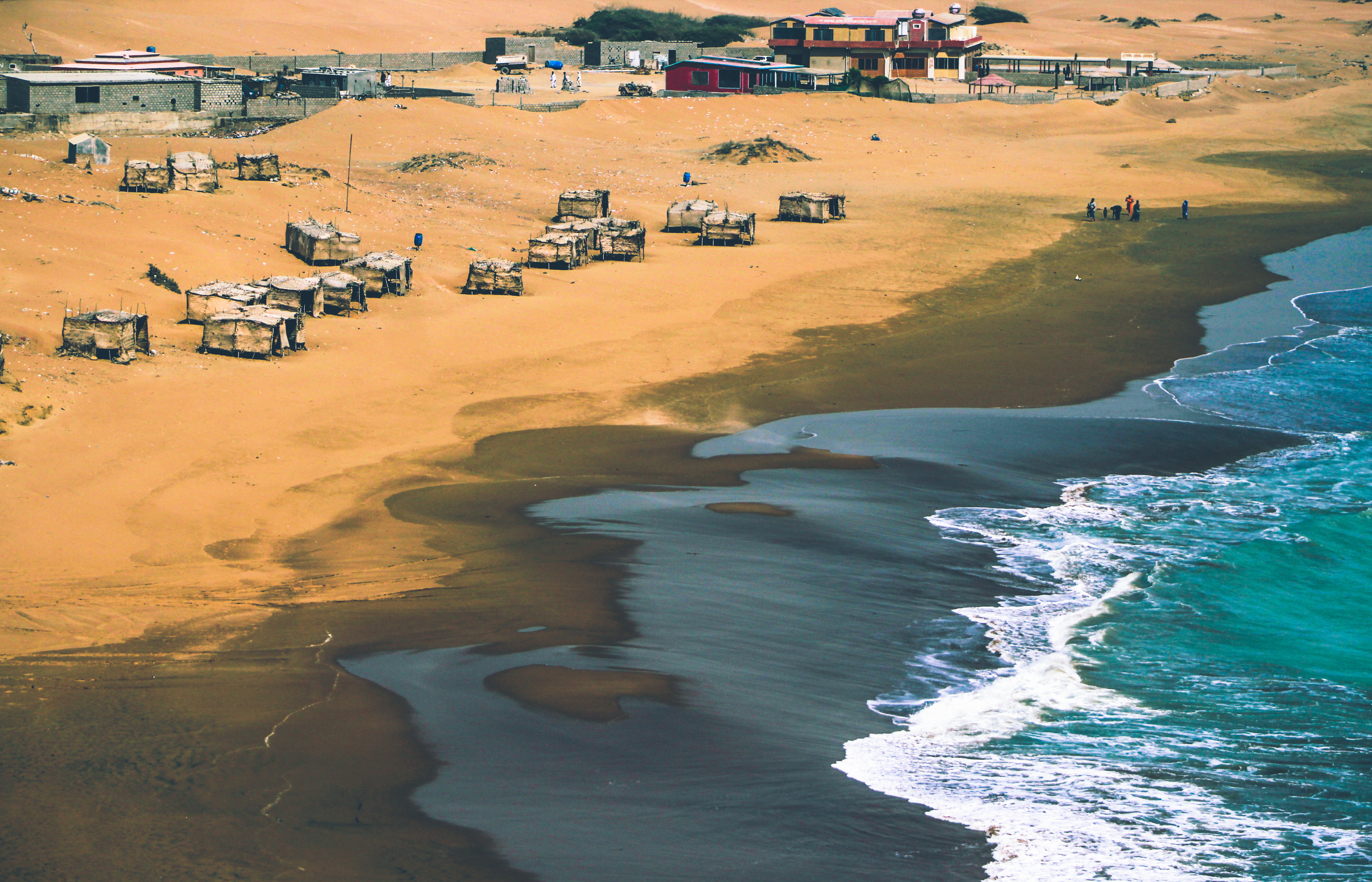
Farmhouses at Kund Malir Beach

== See also ==
- List of beaches in Pakistan
