= PNS Darmaan Jah Hospital =

Hospital in Balochistan, Pakistan

Pakistan Naval Station Darmaan Jah Hospital
- Pakistan Navy

Geography
- Location: Ormara, Balochistan Province, Pakistan
- Coordinates: 25.204007°N 64.636449°E

Organisation
- Type: Military hospital

Services
- Emergency department: 100-bed hospital

History
- Founded: September 12, 2011

Links
- Lists: Hospitals in Pakistan

The Pakistan Naval Station Darmaan Jah or PNS Darmaan Jah Hospital (meaning: place of Cure and Healing in Balochi) is a naval medical treatment facility and hospital located in Ormara, Balochistan Province.

It is the first ever hospital facility established at Ormara, inaugurated by Chief of Naval Staff, Admiral Noman Bashir on September 12, 2011. The PNS Darmaan Jah is a 100-bed hospital.

A new block was inaugurated at PNS Darmaan Jah on 16 April 2025.

== See also ==
- Pakistan Navy
