= Cadet College Ormara =

Military boarding school in Pakistan

Location
- Cadet College Ormara located about 360 km west of Karachi (approx 5 hrs drive). Gwadar Port City is another 230 km east of Ormara city.
- Coordinates: 25.261°N 64.614°E

Information
- Motto: Binding Nation Through Education
- Opened: 2012 at Ormara
- Area: over 700 acres
- Houses: 8
- Colour(s): Red, navy blue and sky blue
- Demonym: Ormarians
- Website: www.ccormara.edu.pk

Pakistan Navy Cadet College Ormara, commonly known as Cadet College Ormara, is a military boarding school in Gwadar District of the southern province of Balochistan in Pakistan; about 360 km from Karachi and 230 km from Gwadar which is under administration of Pakistan Navy.

== History ==
The college was founded in 2013 by Pakistan Navy.

In 2017, academic block of the college was established.
