= Sindh Coastal Highway =

Road in Sindh, Pakistan

Sindh Coastal Highway Highway

Major junctions
- West end: N5 between Dhabeji and Gharo
- East end: Keti Bunder

Location
- Country: Pakistan
- Regions: Sindh

Highway system
- Roads in Pakistan

The Sindh Coastal Highway (شاهراه ساحلی سند) is a road that links Karachi with coastal towns in Sindh. It begins at N5, between Dhabeji and Gharo, and finishes close to Keti Bunder. The highway was created to help farming, bring new life to the fishing industry in the delta area, and make it easier to transport clean drinking water to the people living in coastal villages.

== History ==
The Sindh Coastal Highway project was first planned in 2010 with the aim of helping farming, reviving the declining fishing industry, and making sure coastal villages have enough clean drinking water. The project faced delays because of severe floods, which put it on hold for a few years. Eventually, Phase-I of the project was finished, but Phase II couldn't start for many years.

== Route Description ==
The Phase-II of the Coastal Highway Project goes from Buhara to Keti Bundar and reaches the Arabian Sea. This coastal highway would allow emergency responders to quickly reach places during emergencies and would also significantly boost tourism in the area.

== See also ==
- Makran Coastal Highway
