= Oraea =

Oraea was the name of a sea port near the modern-day city of Ormara, Balochistan province of Pakistan, important in the Hellenistic era in Indian Ocean trade. It is mentioned briefly in the Periplus of the Erythraean Sea:

"Beyond the Ommanitic region there is a country also of the Parsidae, of another Kingdom, and the bay of Gedrosia [Casson: “Gulf of Terabdoi”], from the middle of which a cape juts out into the bay. Here there is a river affording an entrance for ships, with a little market-town at the mouth, called Oraea and back from the place an in-land city, distant a seven days' journey from the sea, in which also is the King's court; it is called ... (probably Rhambacia) [Casson notes the name was inadvertently admitted in the manuscript]. This country yields much wheat, wine, rice and dates; but along the coast there is nothing but bdellium." Periplus, Chap. 38

== See also ==
- Makran
- Gedrosia
- Periplus of the Erythraean Sea
