= Makran Coastal Highway =

Highway in Pakistan

Coordinates: 25°40′34″N 66°36′33″E

National Highway 10
- قومی شاہراہ ١٠
- قومی شاہراہ ۱۰
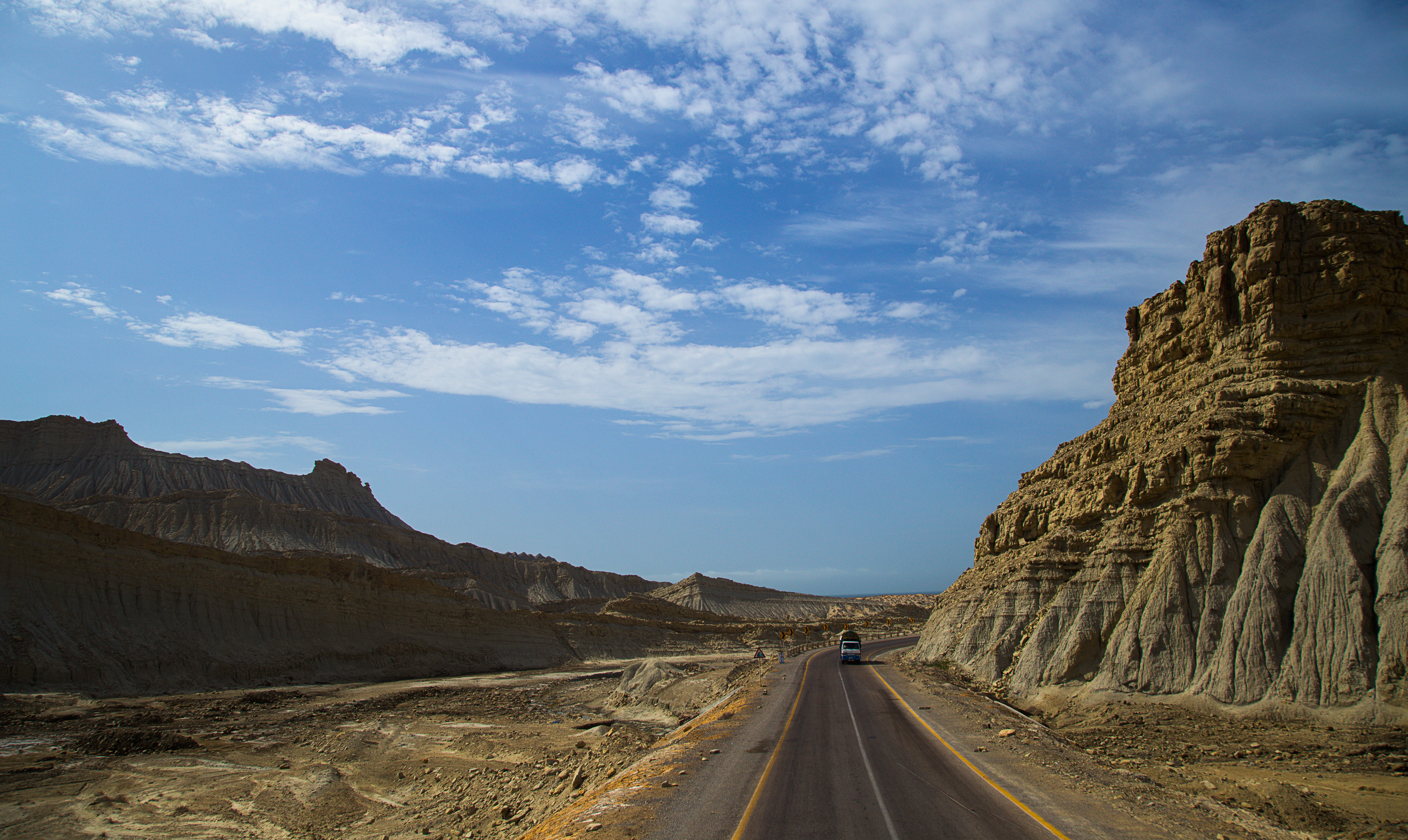
- Makran Coastal Highway (N10)

Route information
- Maintained by NHA
- Length: 653 km (406 mi)
- Existed: 2004–present
- History: Construction started in 2002 and was completed in 2004.

Major junctions
- East end: Karachi
- Kehinwari Gwadar
- West end: Kamp Tuh

Location
- Country: Pakistan
- Major cities: Karachi, Ormara, Pasni, Gwadar

Highway system
- Roads in Pakistan

The N-10 or National Highway 10 (Urdu: قومی شاہراہ ۱۰) is a 653 km national highway in Pakistan which extends along Arabian Sea coast from Karachi in Sindh province to Gwadar in Balochistan province. It passes the towns of Ormara and Pasni in Balochistan. Makran Coastal Highway is managed and maintained by National Highway Authority of Pakistan.

== Background ==
The decision to build a port in Gwadar was initially taken in the early 1990s when the hydrocarbon-laden and mineral-rich Central Asian Republics gained independence after the breakup of the Soviet Union. The construction of the Makran Coastal Highway was essential to the development of the port of Gwadar. Without the Highway, Gwadar would have been an island sitting without the bridges that connect it with Karachi in the south and the rest of Pakistan and beyond in the north and the west. It also provided a potential alternative to the vulnerable choke points in the Strait of Malacca for trade through China.

Prior to the construction of the Makran Coastal Highway in 2004, Karachi was linked to Gwadar via an uncarpeted "jeep" or "dirt" track. The journey between Karachi and Gwadar used to take at least two days and took a heavy toll on the "wear and tear" of vehicles. It was considered preferable to take the safer but longer route via Quetta. After completion of the Makran Coastal Highway, the average journey time between Karachi and Gwadar has been reduced to only 6 to 7 hours and transportation costs have also been reduced.

The Makran Coastal Highway was planned and built by the Government of Pakistan to develop infrastructure and boost economic activity in the areas along Pakistan's coastline, to improve the transportation and communications infrastructure in the province, to develop the coastal towns of Ormara, Pasni and Gwadar into major port cities and link them with the rest of Pakistan's national highways network, and to develop the seafood industry along Pakistan's coastline by reducing the time and costs involved in transporting fresh seafood from seafood catchment areas to major cities in Pakistan as well as export processing zones in Karachi and Gwadar.

== Construction ==
The construction contract for the Makran Coastal Highway was awarded to Pakistan's Frontier Works Organisation (FWO), which had previously built the Karakorum Highway. Construction work on the Makran Coastal Highway Project commenced in 2002 and was completed by 14 December 2004, in a period of three years.

== Gallery ==
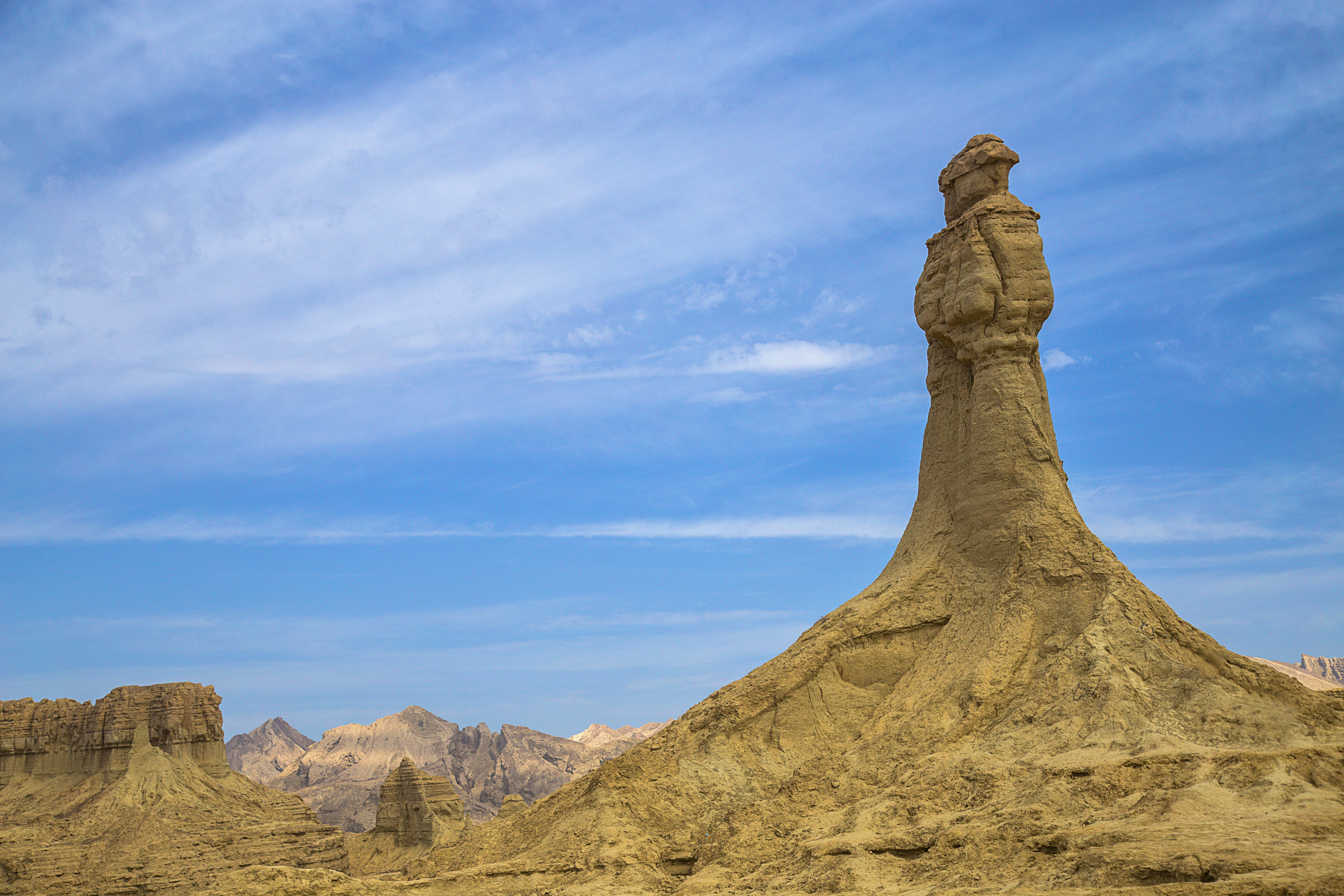
"Princess of Hope" along the N10

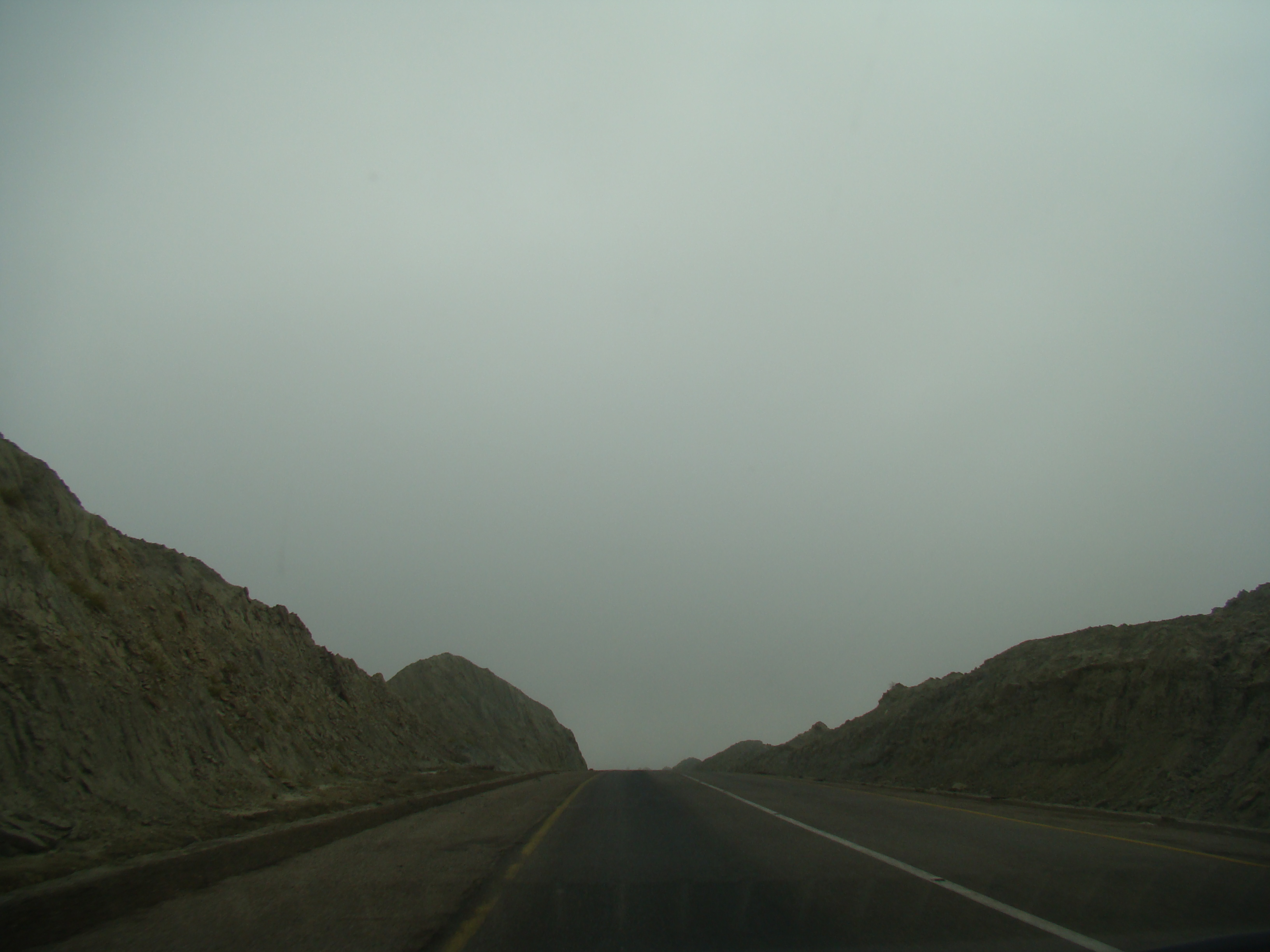
Makran Coastal Highway (N10)

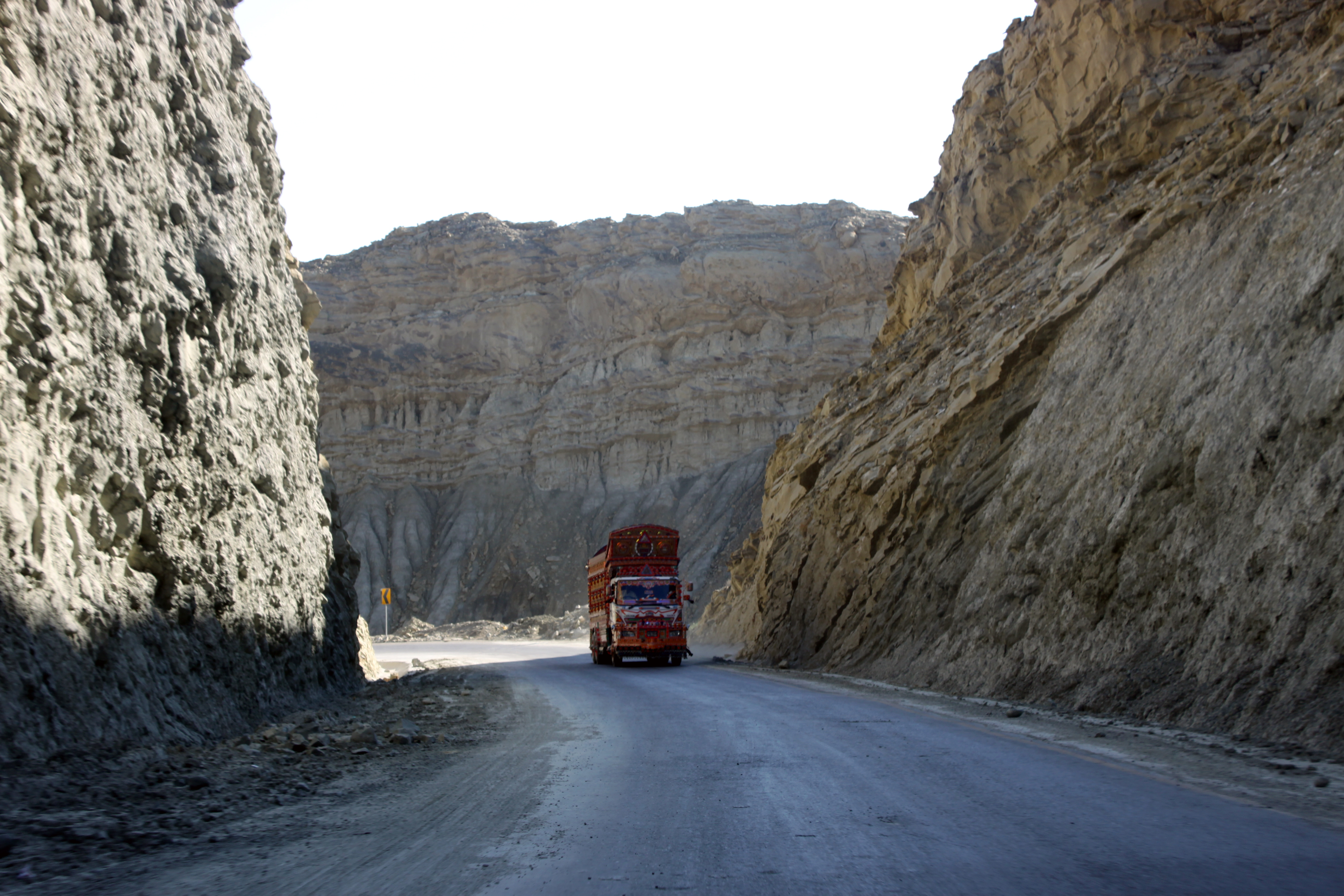
Truck on the N10

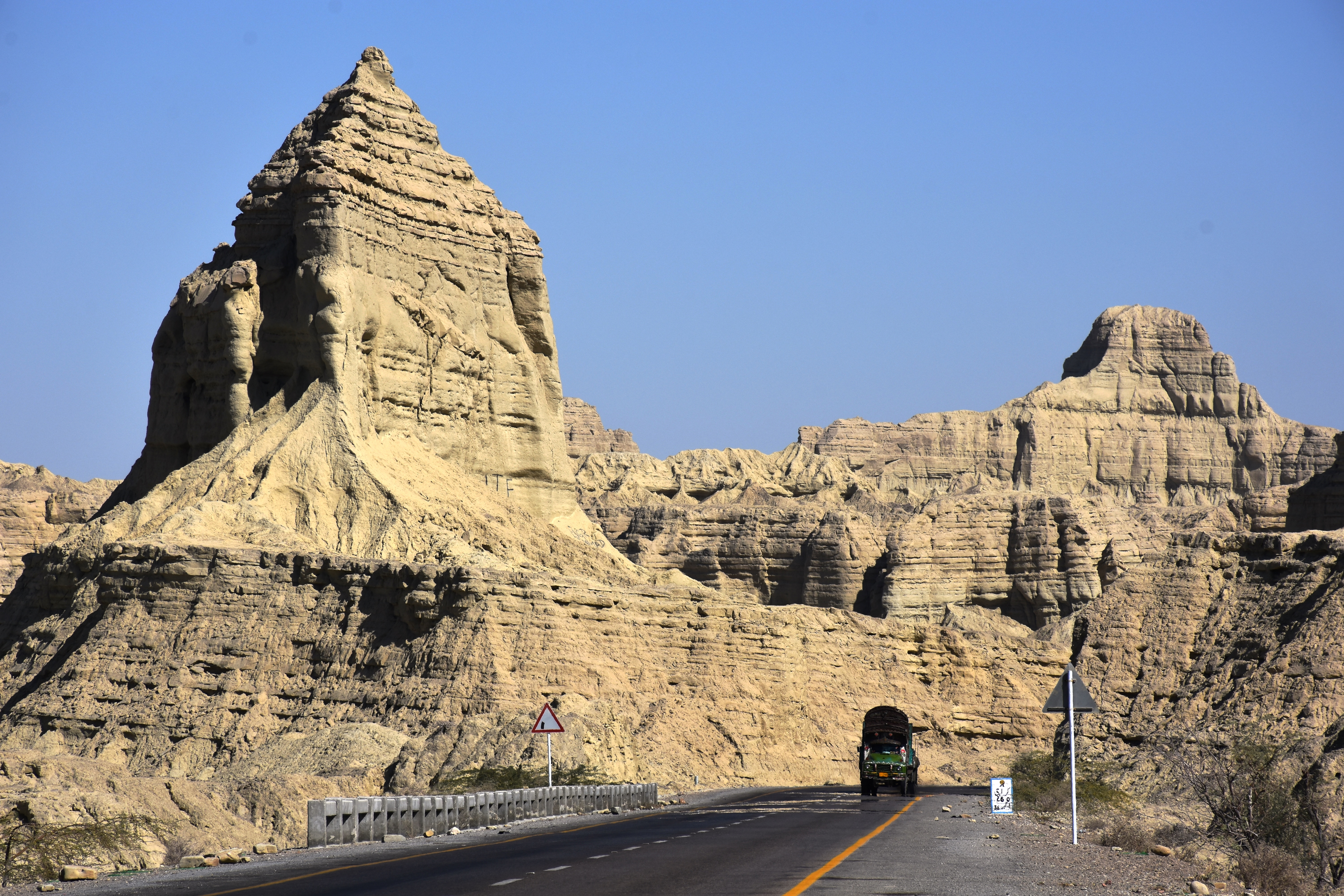
N10 through Hingol National Park

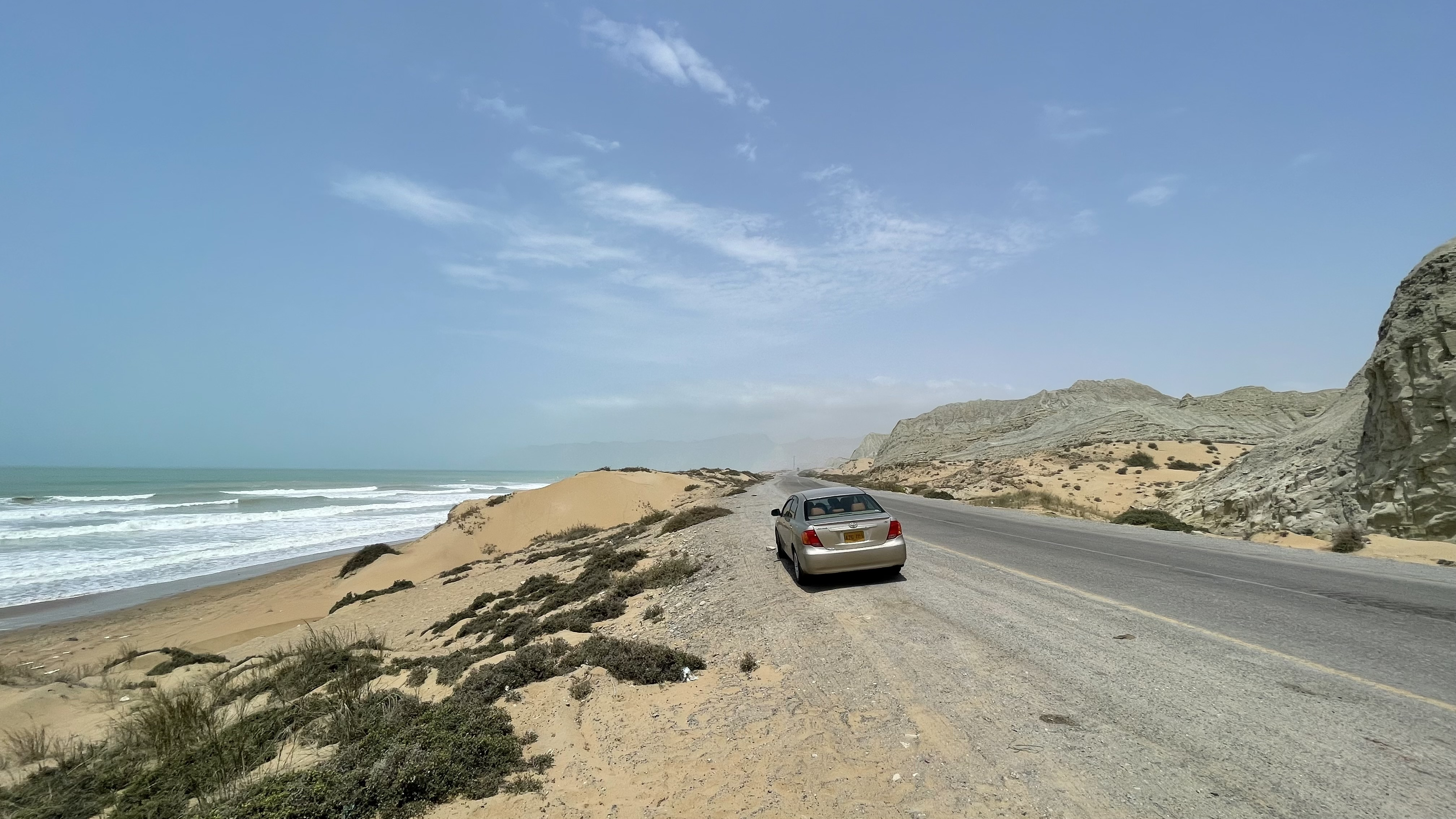
N10 on the Golden Beach

== See also ==
- Sindh Coastal Highway
- National Highways of Pakistan
- Motorways of Pakistan
- Transport in Pakistan
