= Ormara =

Ormara اورماڑا
- City
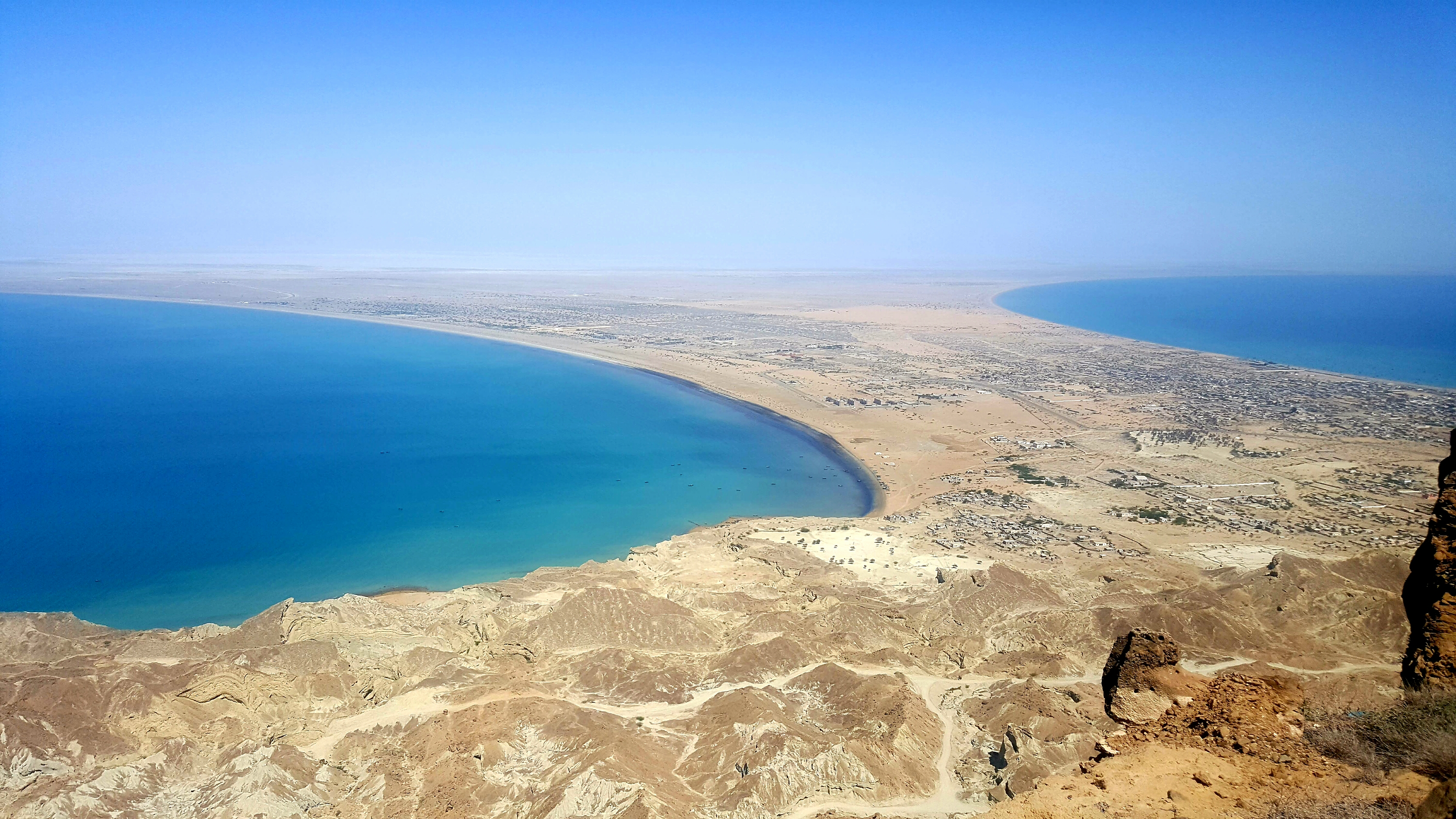
- A view of Ormara's "Double Crescents"

- Location of Ormara Ormara (Pakistan)
- Coordinates: 25°13′6″N 64°37′29″E
- Country: Pakistan
- Province: Balochistan
- District: Gwadar
- Tehsil: Ormara
- Elevation: 7 m (23 ft)

Population (2023 census)
  - Total: 16,573
- Time zone: UTC+5 (PST)
- Postal code: 91400
- Highways: N-10
- Ormara Lighthouse
- Coordinates: 25°11′21.4″N 64°41′22.1″E
- Constructed: 1970
- Foundation: concrete base
- Construction: metal skeletal tower
- Height: 10.7 m (35 ft)
- Shape: square pyramidal skeletal tower
- Markings: grey tower
- Power source: solar power
- Operator: Mercantile Marine Department
- Focal height: 223 m (732 ft)
- Lens: Type LASE-28/6
- Intensity: 28,900 cd
- Range: 16.7 nmi (30.9 km; 19.2 mi)
- Characteristic: Fl (2) W 20s.

Ormara (Balochi and Urdu: اورماڑا, Urdu pronunciation: [oːɾmɑːɽɑː]) is a town and tehsil in Gwadar District in the Balochistan province of Pakistan. It is a port in the Makran coastal region. It is located 360 kilometres (220 mi) west of Karachi and 230 kilometres (140 mi) east of Gwadar on the Arabian Sea. This port is also mentioned in Periplus of the Erythraean Sea as Oraea.

== History ==
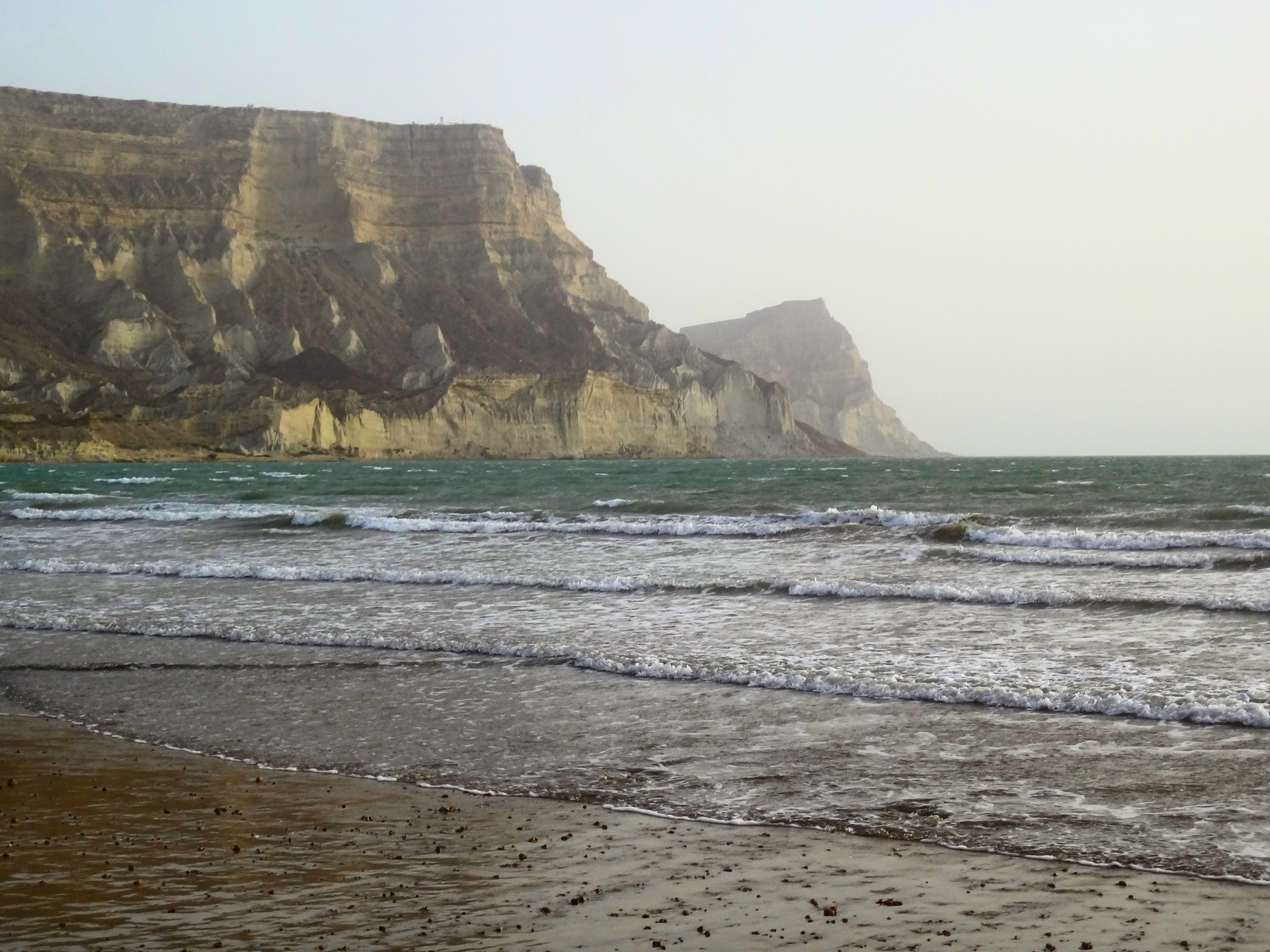
Ormara beach, west side of the city

Ormara is located on the Makran Coastal Highway, midway between Karachi and Gwadar. Its historical routes are linked with Alexander the Great, who stayed there with his army for a few days on his way back from the Indus region after conquering the lands of Sindh, Punjab and the Khyber Pakhtunkhwa regions of modern-day Pakistan in 400 BC. One of his generals, Ormoz, died there, and the present-day city was named after him.

For centuries, Ormara remained a battlefield between the Baloch Sardar (local feudal) and foreign aggressors. Before independence, it was part of the state of Las Bela and afterward in 1975, it became part of the Makran Division. Being an isolated town, it remained undeveloped; however, after the construction of the Makran Coastal Highway and Jinnah Naval Base, life has taken a positive change for the locals with the establishment of many local industries and the resultant increase in jobs available for the locals. This city with a population of about 40,000 still offers a glimpse of the traditional way of life of the people here. Most residents make their livelihood from fishing; a few of them also work in Middle Eastern countries. Ormara has witnessed considerable growth in recent years, especially with the foundation of the Makran Coastal Highway, which integrated the area more with the mainstream Pakistani economy and significant urban centres allowing for transport of goods, commerce and people.

== Demographics ==
=== Population ===
The population of city in 1981 was 8,265 but according to the 2023 Census of Pakistan, the population has risen to 16,573. In the Ormara tehsil, 27,832 people lived in 2023.

Historical population
Year	Pop.	±% p.a.
1951	...	—
1961	...	—
1972	...	—
1981	8,265	—
1998	11,521	+1.97%
2017	15,631	+1.62%
2023	16,573	+0.98%

== Proposed Upgrade District ==
The Government of Balochistan proposed to plan Ormara District or Ormara-Pasni District for better governance and focused development areas of strategic coastal areas of Balochistan. In Proposal Ormara or Ormara-Pasni District will be consist of Ormara tehsil, Pasni tehsil of Gwadar District and Kund Malir proposed new tehsil with the areas of Kund Malir, Aghore, Koh e Sapt nearly area of Lasbela District.

== Transport ==
Ormara has a port and fish harbour. The Jinnah Naval Base of the Pakistan Navy is located at Ormara. Ormara Airport (ORW) is a domestic airport with connections to the rest of Pakistan. The Makran Coastal Highway links Ormara with Karachi to the east and Gwadar to the west.

== Education ==
- Cadet College Ormara
- Bahria College Naval Village Ormara
- Govt Inter Boys College Ormara
- Govt Girls College Ormara
- Govt High School Gazi Lane
- Govt Girls High School Islamia Line
- Govt Middle School Punjag
- Govt Girls Middle School Juna Line
- Govt Primary School Syedabad
- Govt Primary School KohBon
- Govt Primary School Tak

== Military ==
- Ormara Cantonment
- Jinnah Naval Base
- Cadet College Ormara
- PNS Darmaan Jah Hospital

== See also ==
- Ormara Turtle Beaches
- List of lighthouses in Pakistan
- Oraea
