= List of serving admirals of the Pakistan Navy =

This is the list of serving Admirals of the Pakistan Navy. As of 2026, the Navy has 1 Admiral (Chief of the Naval Staff (CNS), 6 Vice Admirals, 26 Rear Admirals and 4 Local Rear Admirals.

== List of Active Admirals ==
Name and Branch	Photo	Position	Decorations	Date of Retirement
Naveed Ashraf, Ops		Chief of the Naval Staff (CNS) NHQ, Islamabad	Nishan-e-Imtiaz(Military); Hilal-e-Imtiaz (Military); Sitara-e-Imtiaz (Military); Tamgha-e-Imtiaz (Military); Tamgha-e-Basalat	7 October 2028

== List of active Vice Admirals ==
#	Name and Branch	Position	Decorations	Date of retirement
1	Abdul Samad, Ops	Commander Naval Strategic Forces Command (CDR NSFC), Islamabad	Hilal-e-Imtiaz (Military) Sitara-e-Imtiaz (Military) Tamgha-e-Imtiaz (Military)	5 July 2029
2	Raja Rab Nawaz, Ops	Chief of Staff, NHQ, Islamabad	Hilal-e-Imtiaz (Military) Sitara-e-Imtiaz (Military) Sitara-e-Basalat	5 July 2029
3	Muhammad Faisal Abbasi, Ops	Commander Karachi (COMKAR), Karachi	Hilal-e-Imtiaz (Military) Sitara-e-Imtiaz (Military)	5 July 2029
4	Khyber Zaman, Ops	Commander Pakistan Fleet (COMPAK), Karachi	Hilal-e-Imtiaz (Military) Sitara-e-Imtiaz (Military) Sitara-e-Basalat	10 January 2030
5	Syed Ahmed Salman, Supp	Deputy Chief of the Naval Staff, Supply (DCNS–S), NHQ, Islamabad	Hilal-e-Imtiaz (Military) Sitara-e-Imtiaz (Military) Tamgha-e-Imtiaz (Military)	10 January 2029
6	Faisal Amin, Ops	Commander Coastal Areas (COMCOAST), Karachi	Hilal-e-Imtiaz (Military) Sitara-e-Imtiaz (Military) Sitara-e-Basalat	10 January 2031

== List of active Rear Admirals ==
#	Name and Branch	Position	Decorations	
1	Salman Ilyas, Const (superseded)	Managing Director, Karachi Shipyard & Engineering Works (MD KS&EW), Karachi	Hilal-e-Imtiaz (Military) Sitara-e-Imtiaz (Military) Tamgha-e-Imtiaz (Military)	14 January 2028
2	Jawad Ahmed, Ops (superseded)	Deputy Chief of the Naval Staff, Projects (DCNS-P), NHQ, Islamabad	Hilal-e-Imtiaz (Military) Sitara-e-Imtiaz (Military) Tamgha-e-Imtiaz (Military)	1 April 2028
3	Shifaat Ali Khan, Ops	Deputy Chief of the Naval Staff, Operations (DCNS-O), NHQ, Islamabad	Sitara-e-Imtiaz (Military) Tamgha-e-Imtiaz (Military)	1 January 2029
4	Amir Mahmood, Ops	Additional Secretary III (AS-III), MOD, Rawalpindi	Sitara-e-Imtiaz (Military)	14 July 2029
5	Imtiaz Ali, Ops	Deputy Chief of the Naval Staff, Welfare and Housing (DCNS-W&H), NHQ, Islamabad	Hilal-e-Imtiaz(Military) Sitara-e-Imtiaz (Military) Tamgha-e-Basalat Tamgha-e-Basalat	14 July 2029
6	Muhammad Hussain Sial, Marine Engg	Director General (Technical), Port Qasim (DGT PQ), Karachi	Hilal-e-Imtiaz (Military) Sitara-e-Imtiaz (Military)	10 December 2029
7	Khyber Zaman, Ops	Flag Officer Sea Training (FOST), Karachi	Sitara-e-Imtiaz (Military)	17 February 2030
8	Shafquat Hussain Akhtar, Ops	Deputy President National Defence University, Islamabad	Sitara-e-Imtiaz (Military)	17 February 2030
9	Adnan Majeed, Ops	(Appointment unknown)	Hilal-e-Imtiaz (Military) Sitara-e-Imtiaz (Military)	5 July 2030
10	Mazhar Mahmood Malik, Marine Engg	Commander Logistics (COMLOG), Karachi	Sitara-e-Imtiaz (Military) Tamgha-e-Imtiaz (Military)	15 December 2030
11	Shahzad Hamid, Ops	Director General Naval Intelligence (DGNI), NHQ, Islamabad	Sitara-e-Imtiaz (Military) Tamgha-e-Basalat	15 December 2030
12	Azhar Mahmood, Ops	Director General Joint Warfare & Training (DG JW&T), Defence Services HQ, Rawalpindi	Sitara-e-Imtiaz (Military) Tamgha-e-Imtiaz (Military)	15 December 2030
13	Muhammad Khalid, Ops	Director General (Operations), Port Qasim Authority, Karachi	Sitara-e-Imtiaz (Military) Tamgha-e-Imtiaz (Military)	27 August 2031
14	Shahzad Iqbal, Ops	Director General, Pakistan Maritime Security Agency (DG PMSA), Karachi	Sitara-e-Imtiaz (Military) Tamgha-e-Imtiaz (Military)	21 October 2031
15	Ateeq ur Rehman Abid, Ops	General Manager, Operations (GM-O) at Karachi Port Trust (KPT), Karachi	Sitara-e-Imtiaz (Military) Tamgha-e-Imtiaz (Military)	22 November 2031
16	Kashif Munir, Marine Engg	General Manager-Engineering (GM-E), Karachi Port Trust, Karachi	Sitara-e-Imtiaz (Military) Tamgha-e-Imtiaz (Military)	10 March 2031
17	Kamran Ahmed, Const	Director General, Maritime Technology Complex (DG MTC), Islamabad	Sitara-e-Imtiaz (Military) Tamgha-e-Imtiaz (Military)	10 March 2031
18	Muhammad Shahnawaz Khan, Supp	Director General Munition Production (DGMP) at Ministry of Defence Production	Sitara-e-Imtiaz (Military) Tamgha-e-Imtiaz (Military)	23 October 2030
19	Asim Sohail Malik, Ops	DG C4I, NHQ, Islamabad	Sitara-e-Imtiaz (Military) Tamgha-e-Imtiaz (Military)	23 October 2030
20	Sohail Ahmed Azmie, Ops	Commander Central Punjab (COMCEP), Commandant Pakistan Navy War College, Lahore	Sitara-e-Imtiaz (Military) Tamgha-e-Imtiaz (Military)	23 October 2030
21	Javed Zia, Weapon Engg	Deputy Chief of the Naval Staff, Materials (DCNS-M), NHQ, Islamabad	Sitara-e-Imtiaz (Military) Tamgha-e-Imtiaz (Military)	4 February 2031
22	Armaghan Ahmad, Marine Engg	Managing Director PN Dockyard (MD Dockyard), Karachi	Sitara-e-Imtiaz (Military) Tamgha-e-Imtiaz (Military)	4 February 2031
23	Tasawar Iqbal, Ops	Commander West (COMWEST), Gwadar	Sitara-e-Imtiaz (Military) Tamgha-e-Imtiaz (Military)	29 July 2033
24	Muhammad Umair, Ops	Commandant Pakistan Naval Academy, PNS Rahbar, Karachi	Sitara-e-Imtiaz (Military)	29 July 2033
25	Shahid Wasif, Ops	DG FW&T,NHQ, Islamabad	Sitara-e-Imtiaz (Military) Tamgha-e-Imtiaz (Military) Imtiazi Sanad	29 July 2033
26	Rao Ahmed Imran Anwar, Ops	Naval Secretary, NHQ, Islamabad	Sitara-e-Imtiaz (Military) Tamgha-e-Imtiaz (Military) Tamgha-e-Basalat	29 July 2033

== List of designated and active Local Rear Admirals ==
Local rank: A higher rank awarded to a person temporarily when serving and restricted to service in a particular region or location. The seniority is never considered in this rank as they are not promoted officially and without the signed approval of Prime Minister of Pakistan thus remaining the most junior two star officers in service with the payscale of previous rank.

#	Name and Branch	Position	Decoration	Date of Retirement
1	Syed Rizwan Khalid, Ops	(Appointment unknown)	Sitara-e-Imtiaz (Military)	
2	Muhammad Nauman Rafique, Ops	Director General PN Concept and Doctrine Development Center (DG PNCDDC),Karachi	Sitara-e-Imtiaz (Military)	
3	Saqib Ilyas, Ops	Commander North (COMNOR),NHQ, Islamabad	Sitara-e-Imtiaz (Military)	
4	Ahmed Hussain, Ops	Director General Public Relations-Navy (DGPR Navy),NHQ,Islamabad	Sitara-e-Imtiaz (Military)	19 April 2028

== See also ==
- List of serving Generals of the Pakistan Army
- List of serving Air Marshals of the Pakistan Air Force
