= Imtiaz Ali (admiral) =

Rear Admiral

Rear Admiral Imtiaz Ali HI(M) SI(M) TBt & Bar
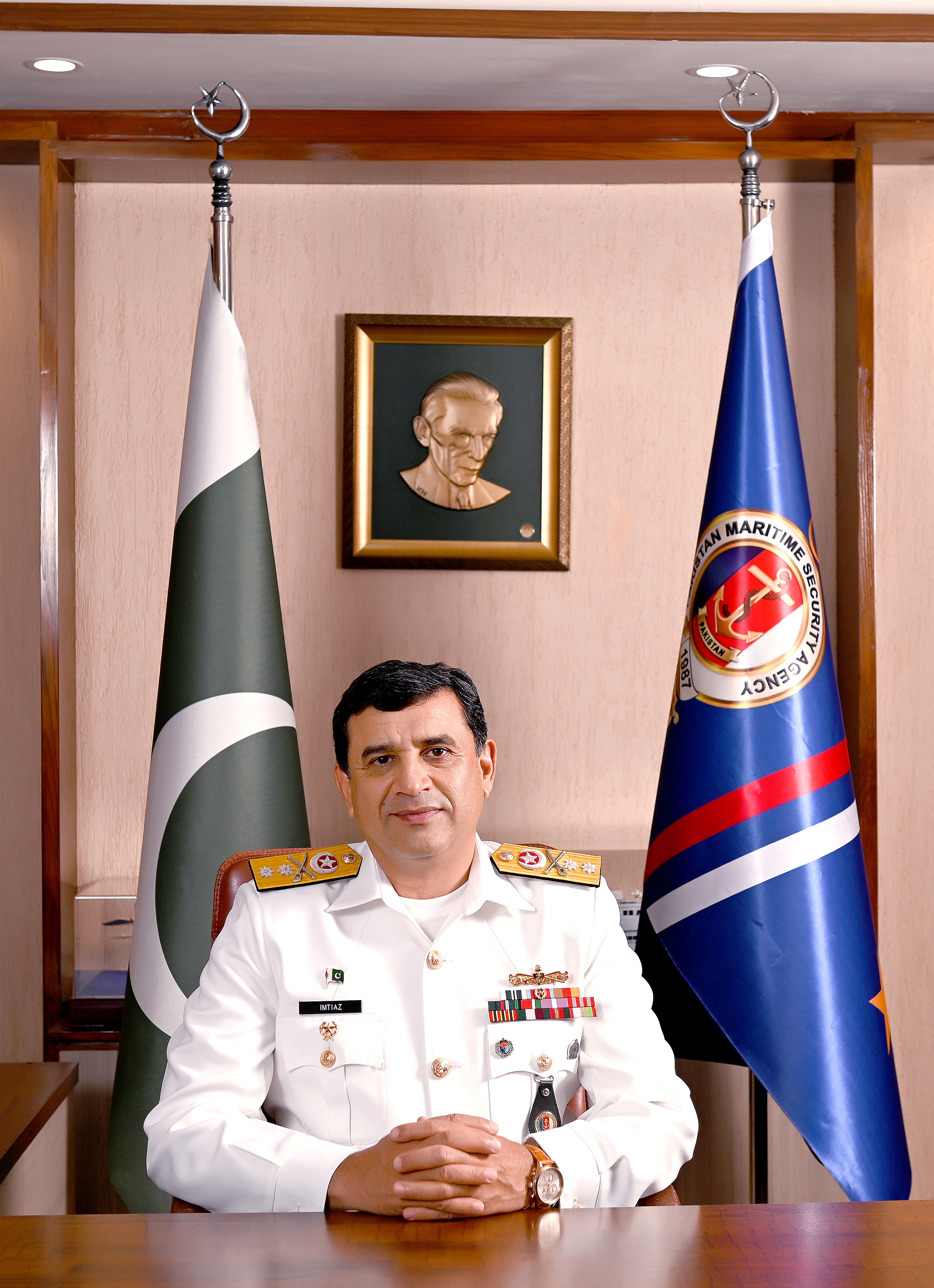
- Education: National Defence University; Pakistan Navy War College
- Military career
- Allegiance: Pakistan
- Branch: Pakistan Navy
- Service years: 1988-present
- Rank: Rear Admiral
- Commands: Director General Pakistan Maritime Security Agency; Commander West (COMWEST); Commander 25th Destroyer Squadron (COMDESRON-25); PNS ALAMGIR; PNS MUJAHID
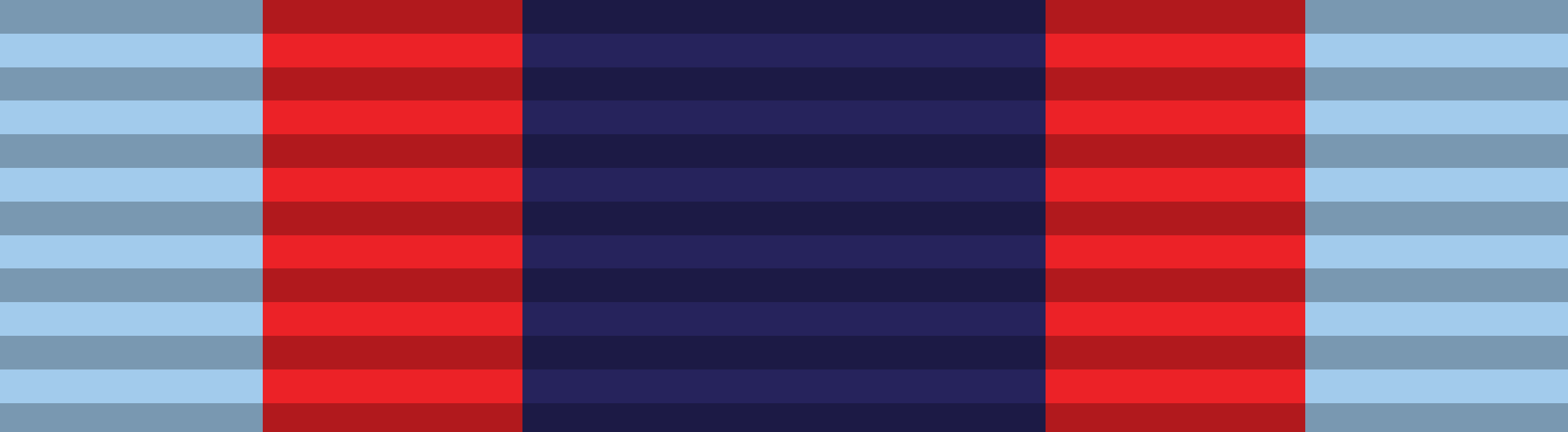
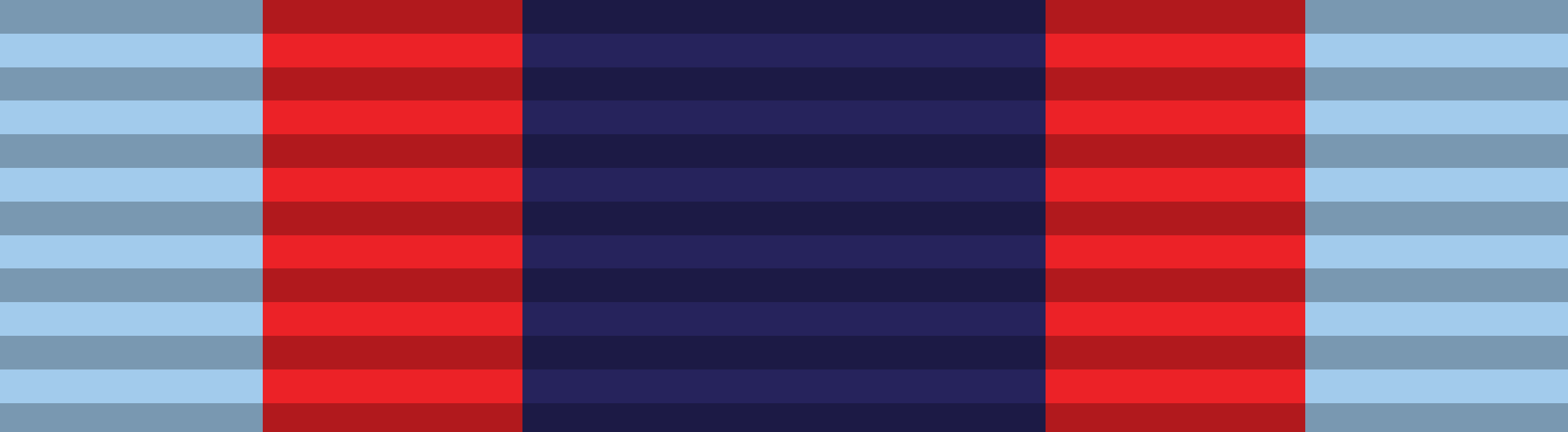
- Awards: Hilal-e-Imtiaz (Military); Sitara-e-Imtiaz (Military); Tamgha-e-Basalat; Tamgha-e-Basalat

Imtiaz Ali HI(M), TBt & Bar is a rear admiral of the Pakistan Navy, currently holding the position of Deputy Chief of the Naval Staff, Welfare and Housing (DCNS-W&H) at Naval Headquarters, Islamabad.

== Career ==
Imtiaz Ali studied at the National Defence University, Islamabad and Pakistan Navy War College, Lahore, and received his commission to the Operations Branch of Pakistan Navy in 1993.

Ali is the commissioning Executive Officer of only OHP Class Frigate, PNS ALAMGIR (ex USS McInerney) in service in Pakistan Navy. He has served as the Director General Pakistan Maritime Security Agency (DG PMSA), Commander West (COMWEST), Commander Standing Task Group - 1, Commander 25th Destroyer Squadron and as Commanding Officer of PNS ALAMGIR, and PNS MUJAHID. In staff positions, Rear Admiral Ali has served as the Naval Seceratary at Naval Headquarters, Chief Naval Overseer for the 1st OPV Mission in Romania, Director of the Pakistan Navy Tactical School, Naval Liaison Officer at US NAVCENT Bahrain, and Assistant Principal Staff Officer to the Chairman Joint Chiefs of Staff Committee at JSHQ.

In November 2023, he engaged in a bilateral meeting with the Iranian Border Police Commander, Brigadier General Ahmad-Ali Goudarzi. The discussions were aimed to enhance border control measures between the two countries through collaborative efforts, including joint patrols and maneuvers. The primary objectives include the prevention of drug trafficking and illegal fishing, as well as ensuring the safety of fishermen at sea.

== Awards and decorations ==
Rear Admiral Imtiaz Ali is a recipient of Sitara-e-Imtiaz (Military). He has also been conferred upon Tamgha-e-Basalat twice.

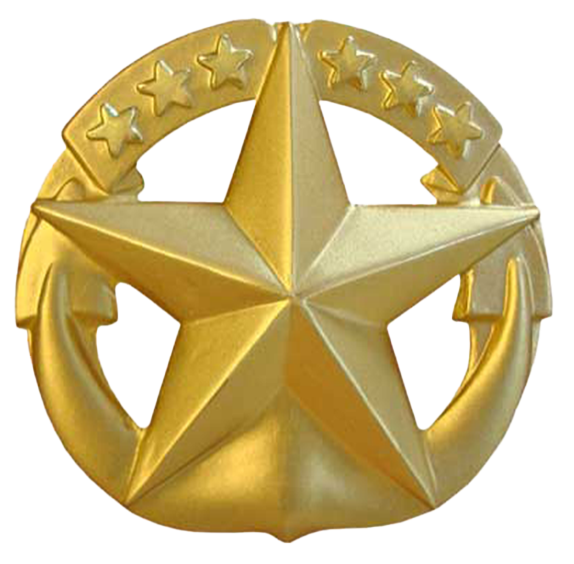

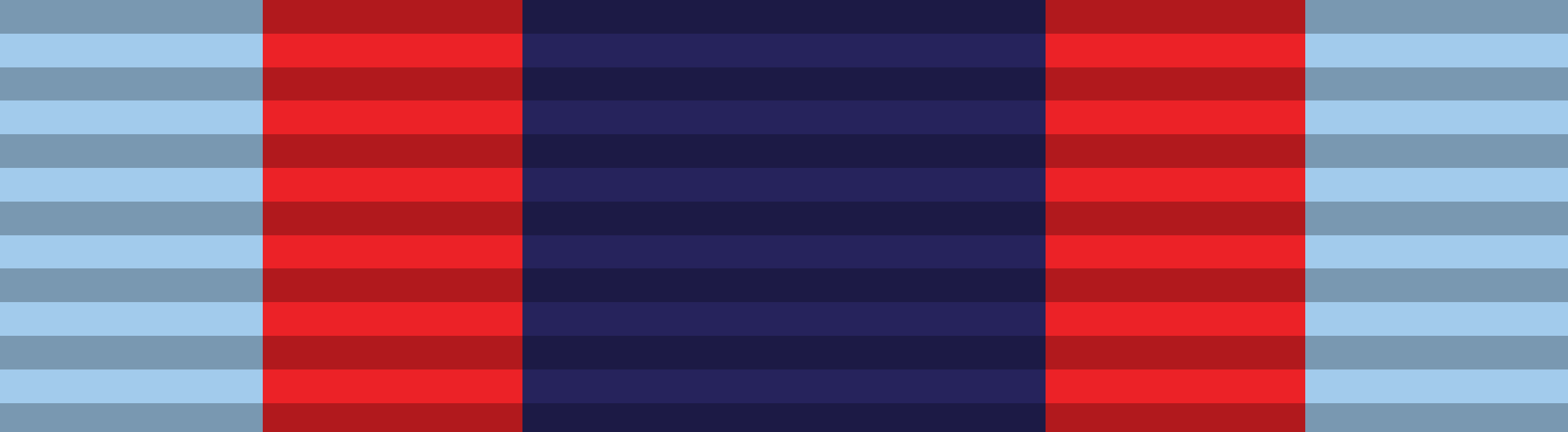

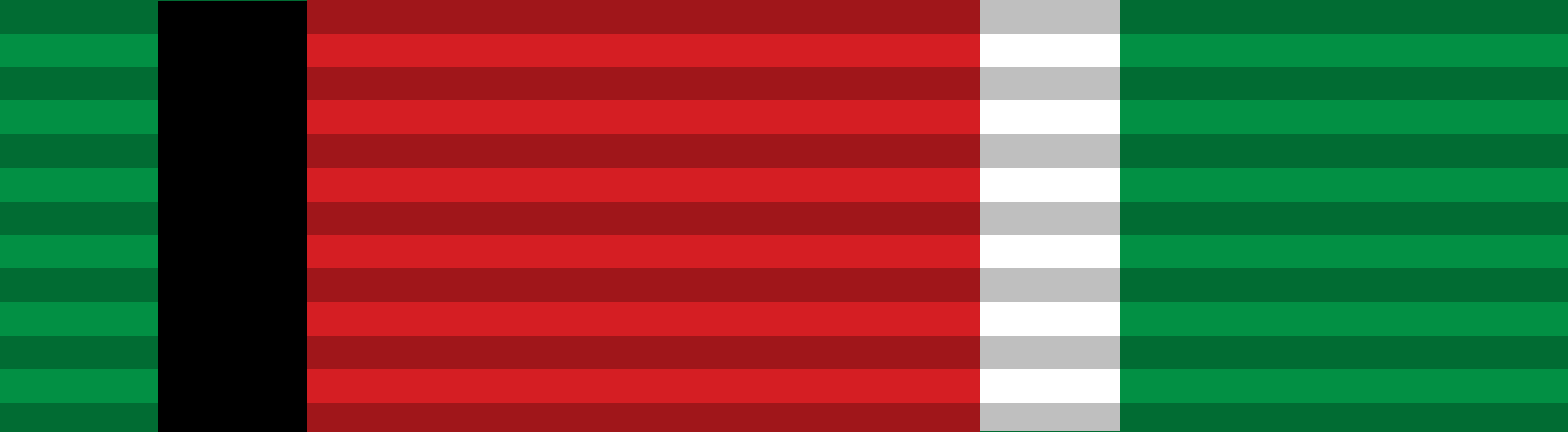

Pakistan Navy Operations Branch Badge
Command at Sea insignia
Sitara-e-Imtiaz (Military) (Star of Excellence)	Tamgha-i-Basalat (Medal of Good Conduct)	Tamgha-e-Baqa (Nuclear Test Medal) 1998	
Tamgha-e-Istaqlal Pakistan (Escalation with India Medal) 2002	Tamgha-e-Azm (Medal of Conviction) (2018)	10 Years Service Medal	20 Years Service Medal
30 Years Service Medal	Jamhuriat Tamgha (Democracy Medal) 1988	Qarardad-e-Pakistan Tamgha (Resolution Day Golden Jubilee Medal) 1990	Tamgha-e-Salgirah Pakistan (Independence Day Golden Jubilee Medal) 1997
