= Azhar Mahmood (rear admiral) =

Rear Admiral

Rear Admiral Azhar Mahmood SI(M) TI(M)
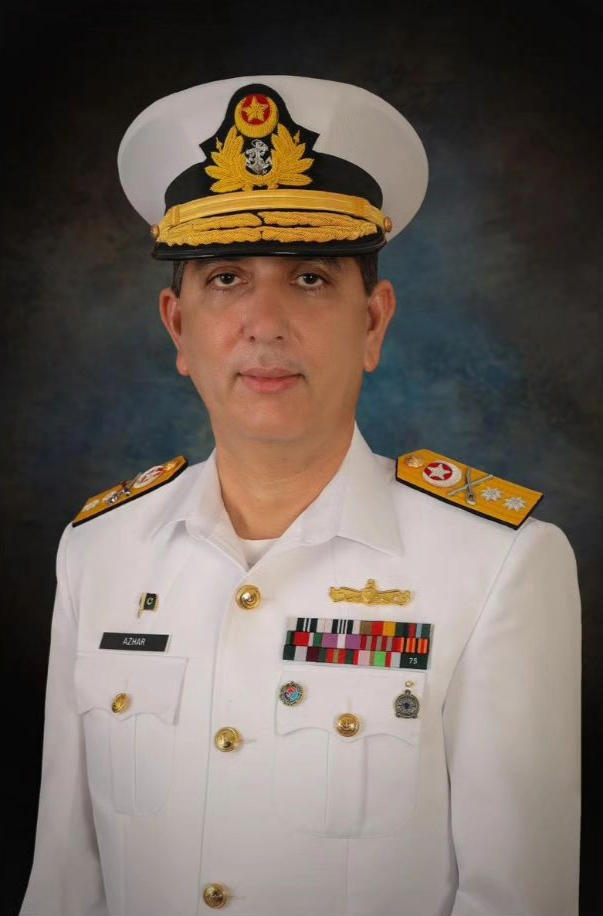
- Education: National Defence University; Pakistan Navy War College
- Military career
- Allegiance: Pakistan
- Branch: Pakistan Navy
- Service years: 1989-present
- Rank: Rear Admiral
- Commands: Commander Central Punjab (COMCEP); Pakistan Navy War College; Commander 9th Auxiliary and Mine Warfare Squadron (COMAUXMIN-9); Commander 25th Destroyer Squadron (COMDESRON-25); PMSS Kashmir; PNS TARIQ; PMSS Barkat
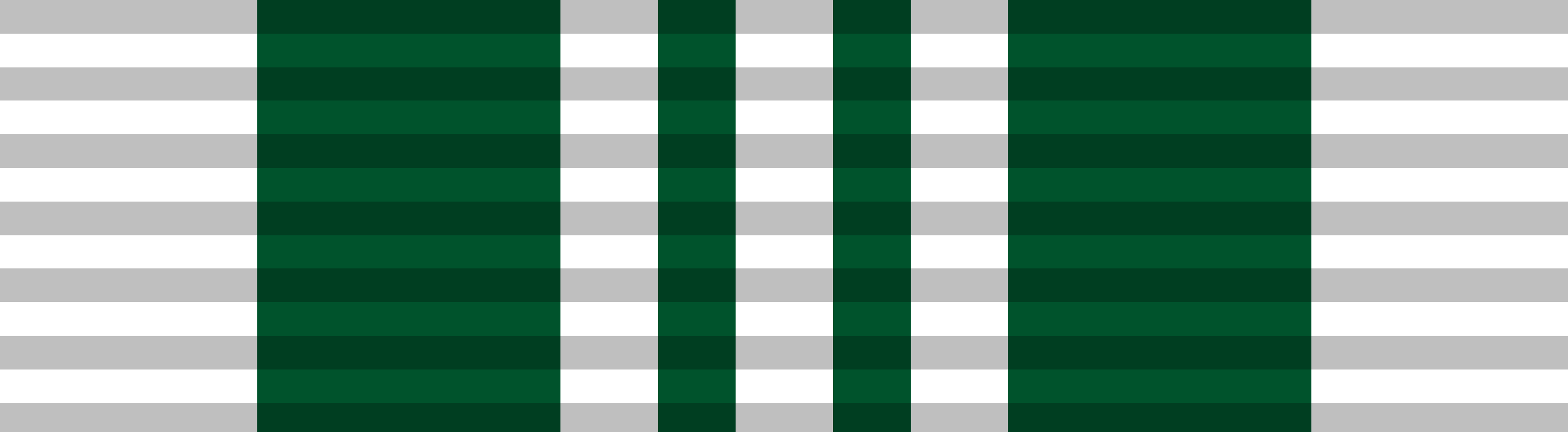
- Awards: Sitara-e-Imtiaz (Military); Tamgha-e-Imtiaz (Military)

Azhar Mahmood SI(M) is a rear admiral of the Pakistan Navy, presently holding the position of Director General Joint Warfare & Training (DG JW&T) at Defence Services HQ, Rawalpindi.

== Education ==
Mahmood is a graduate of the Pakistan Navy War College Lahore, Defence Services Command and Staff College Bangladesh, and the National Defence University Islamabad.

== Career ==
Mahmood was commissioned into the Operations Branch of the Pakistan Navy in 1993. Throughout his career, Mahmood has held various command and staff appointments. His command roles include Commanding Officer of PMSS Barkat, PMSS Kashmir, PNS Tariq; Commander of the 9th Auxiliary and Mine Warfare Squadron; and Commander of the 25th Destroyer Squadron, Commander Central Punjab (COMCEP), and Commandant Pakistan Navy War College, Lahore. He has also served in international capacities, as chief of staff to the Commander Combined Task Force-150 at HQ NAVCENT Bahrain, and in key positions such as Director Studies at the National Defence University Islamabad and Director of Foreign Military Collaboration at Naval Headquarters.

Mahmood was the Mission Commander during the Pakistan Navy Ship ALAMGIR’s overseas deployment around Africa and aligned with the Engage Africa Policy of the Government of Pakistan. This diplomatic mission included visit of the ship to Egypt, Turkey, Algeria, Senegal, Nigeria, Tanzania, and Kenya, during which free medical camps were established. These camps, staffed by a team of senior doctors, offered free consultations and medicines to citizens of these nations, reflecting both diplomatic engagement and humanitarian efforts of Pakistan Navy.

In January 2024, Mahmood headed a delegation consisting of faculty members and participants from the PN Staff Course of Pakistan Navy War College on an Inland Study Tour (IST) to Karachi. The delegation visited a range of military and civilian organizations, including the Governor House and the Chief Minister House.

== Awards and decorations ==
In recognition of his service, Mahmood has been conferred upon the Sitara-e-Imtiaz (Military) and Tamgha-e-Imtiaz (Military).

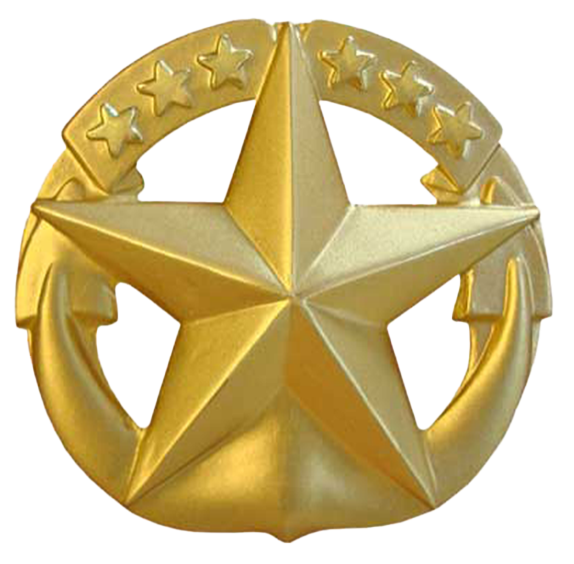

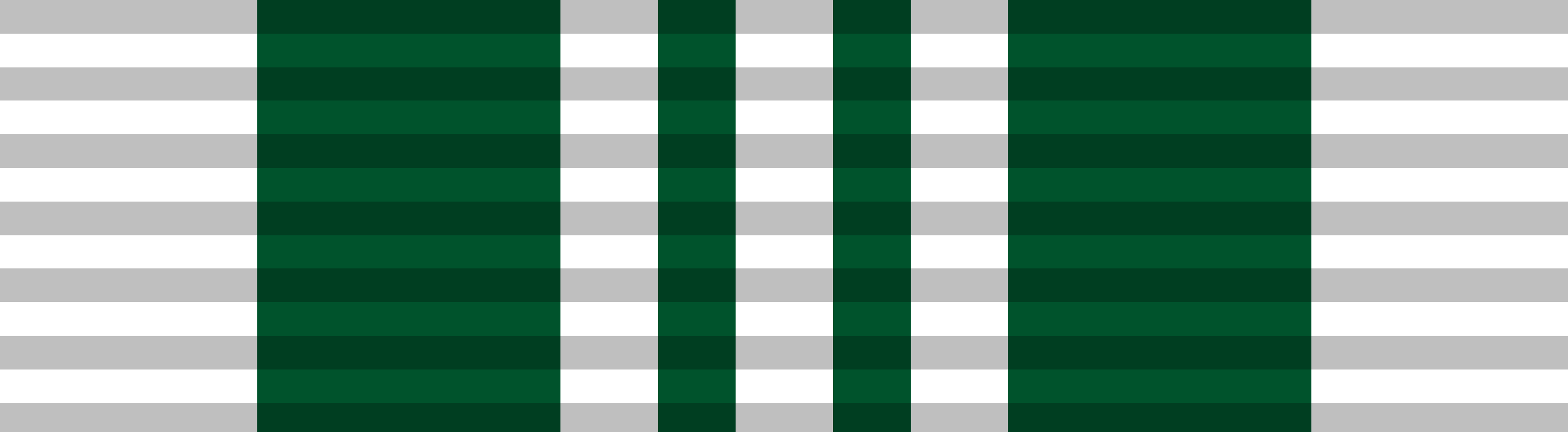

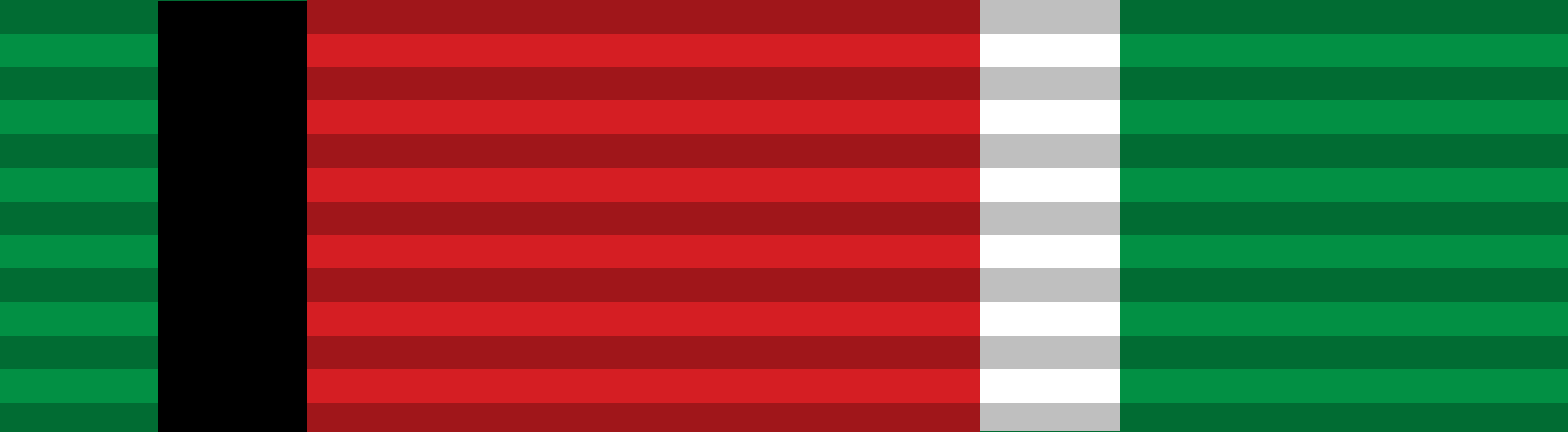

Pakistan Navy Operations Branch Badge
Command at Sea insignia
Sitara-e-Imtiaz (Military) (Star of Excellence)	Tamgha-e-Imtiaz (Military) (Medal of Excellence)	Tamgha-e-Baqa (Nuclear Test Medal) 1998	
Tamgha-e-Istaqlal Pakistan (Escalation with India Medal) 2002	Tamgha-e-Azm (Medal of Conviction) (2018)	10 Years Service Medal	20 Years Service Medal
30 Years Service Medal	Jamhuriat Tamgha (Democracy Medal) 1988	Qarardad-e-Pakistan Tamgha (Resolution Day Golden Jubilee Medal) 1990	Tamgha-e-Salgirah Pakistan (Independence Day Golden Jubilee Medal) 1997
