= List of serving air marshals of the Pakistan Air Force =

In the Pakistan Air Force, Air Marshals are equivalent to general officers of the army. At present, the Air Force has 1 Air Chief Marshal (ACM), 10 Air Marshals (AM) and 36 Air Vice Marshals (AVM).

== List of active air chief marshals ==
Name	Branch	Position	Decorations	Date of Retirement
Zaheer Ahmed Baber Sidhu	GD(P)	Chief of the Air Staff (CAS), AHQ, Islamabad	Nishan-e-Imtiaz (Military); Hilal-e-Jurat; Hilal-e-Imtiaz (Military); Sitara-e-Imtiaz (Military); Tamgha-e-Imtiaz (Military); Turkish Legion of Merit; Order of King Abdulaziz	18 March 2028

== List of active air marshals ==
#	Name	Branch	Position	Decorations	Year of Retirement
1	Zaffar Aslam	GD(P)	Vice Chief of the Air Staff, (VCAS)	Hilal-e-Imtiaz (Military) Sitara-e-Imtiaz (Military); Sitara-e-Basalat; Tamgha-e-Imtiaz (Military)	2028
2	S Fauad Masud Hatmi	GD(P)	Deputy Chief of the Air Staff, Inspection & Evaluation (DCAS-I & E), AHQ, Islamabad	Hilal-e-Imtiaz (Military) Sitara-e-Imtiaz (Military); Tamgha-e-Basalat	2028
3	Muhammad Sarfraz	GD(P)	Deputy Chief of the Air Staff, Air Defence (DCAS-AD), AHQ, Islamabad	Hilal-e-Imtiaz (Military) Sitara-e-Imtiaz (Military); Tamgha-e-Basalat	2028
4	Kazim Hammad	GD(P)	Deputy Chief of the Air Staff, Administration (DCAS-A), AHQ, Islamabad	Hilal-e-Imtiaz (Military) Sitara-e-Imtiaz (Military); Tamgha-e-Imtiaz (Military)	2028
5	Shakil Ghazanfar	GD(P)	Deputy Chief of the Air Staff, Personnel (DCAS-P), AHQ, Islamabad	Hilal-e-Imtiaz (Military); Sitara-e-Imtiaz (Military); Tamgha-e-Imtiaz (Military)	2028
6	Kashif Qamar	GD(P)	Deputy President, NASTP Advisory Board, AHQ, Islamabad	Hilal-e-Imtiaz (Military) Sitara-e-Imtiaz (Military); Tamgha-e-Imtiaz (Military)	2029
7	Aamir Shahzad	GD(P)	Deputy Chief of the Air Staff, Training (DCAS-T), AHQ, Islamabad	Hilal-e-Imtiaz (Military) Sitara-e-Imtiaz (Military); Sitara-e-Basalat	2029
8	Muhammad Ehsan Ul Haq	GD(P)	Deputy Chief of the Air Staff, Operations (DCAS-Ops), AHQ, Islamabad	Sitara-e-Imtiaz (Military)	2029
9	Zaeem Afzal	GD(P)	Deputy Chief of the Air Staff, PFX (DCAS-PFX), AHQ, Islamabad	Sitara-e-Imtiaz (Military); Tamgha-e-Imtiaz (Military)	2029
10	Imran Qadir	GD (P)	Deputy Chief of the Air Staff, Support (DCAS-Supp), AHQ, Islamabad	Sitara-e-Imtiaz (Military)	2029

== List of active air vice marshals ==
#	Name	Branch	Position	Decoration	Year of Retirement
5	Shakeel Safdar	Engg	Director General, Pakistan Air Force Airworthiness Certification Authority (DG PACA), AHQ, Islamabad	Hilal-e-Imtiaz (Military) Sitara-e-Imtiaz (Military)	2025
8	Tahir Mehmood	AD	Air Officer Commanding, Air Defence Command (AOC ADC), Rawalpindi	Hilal-e-Imtiaz (Military) Sitara-e-Imtiaz (Military); Tamgha-e-Imtiaz (Military) Tamgha-e-Basalat	2026
9	Mohsin Mahmood	Engg	Director General, Development, National Aerospace Science and Technology Park (DG Development, NASTP), Rawalpindi	Sitara-e-Imtiaz (Military)	2026
10	Nasir Jamal Khattak	GD(P)	Director General, Security (DG Security), AHQ, Islamabad	Sitara-e-Imtiaz (Military); Tamgha-e-Imtiaz (Military)	2028
11	Aurangzeb Ahmed	GD(P)	Commander, Air Force Strategic Command (Comdr. AFSC), AHQ, Islamabad	Sitara-e-Imtiaz (Military); Tamgha-e-Imtiaz (Military)	2026
12	Taimur Iqbal	GD(P)	Air Officer Commanding, Northern Air Command (AOC NAC), Peshawar	Sitara-e-Imtiaz (Military); Tamgha-e-Imtiaz (Military)	2026
13	Hakim Raza	GD(P)	Chairman, Pakistan Aeronautical Complex Board (Chairman PACB), Kamra	Sitara-e-Imtiaz (Military); Tamgha-e-Imtiaz (Military)	2026
14	Tariq Mahmood Ghazi	GD(P)	Director General, Training (DG Trg), AHQ, Islamabad	Sitara-e-Imtiaz (Military)	2026
16	Shahryar Khan	GD (P)	Air Officer Commanding, Pakistan Air Force Academy Asghar Khan (AOC PAF Academy Asghar Khan), Risalpur	Sitara-e-Imtiaz (Military); Tamgha-e-Imtiaz (Military)	2027
17	Mehr Yar Saqib Niazi	Engg	Director, Precision Engineering Complex (Dir. PEC), PIA, Karachi	Sitara-e-Imtiaz (Military); Tamgha-e-Imtiaz (Military)	2027
18	Muhammad Asif Aslam	Engg	Director General, NUTECH Office of Research, Industrialization, Internationalization and Commercialization (DG NORIIC), Islamabad	Sitara-e-Imtiaz (Military); Tamgha-e-Imtiaz (Military)	2027
19	Ghulam Shabbir	Engg	Director General, Air Weapon Complex (DG AWC), Wah	Sitara-e-Imtiaz (Military); Tamgha-e-Imtiaz (Military)	2027
20	Liaquat Ullah Iqbal	GD (P)	Chief Project Director & Chief Executive Officer, National Aerospace Science & Technology Park (CPD & CEO NASTP), Rawalpindi	Sitara-e-Imtiaz (Military)	2027
21	Farhan Akhtar	AD	Director General, Defence Purchase, Ministry of Defence Production (DG DP, MoDP), Rawalpindi	Sitara-e-Imtiaz (Military); Tamgha-e-Imtiaz (Military)	2028
22	Ijaz Yousaf	AD		Sitara-e-Imtiaz (Military); Tamgha-e-Imtiaz (Military)	2028
23	Rashid Habib	GD(P)	President, Air War College Institute (President AWCI), Karachi	Sitara-e-Imtiaz (Military); Tamgha-e-Imtiaz (Military)	2028
24	Imran Saddozai	GD(P)	Air Officer Commanding, Southern Air Command (AOC SAC), Karachi	Sitara-e-Imtiaz (Military)	2028
25	Taimur Yousaf	GD(P)	Director General, Command, Control, Communications, Computers and Intelligence (DG C4I), AHQ, Islamabad	Sitara-e-Imtiaz (Military); Tamgha-e-Imtiaz (Military)	2028
26	Aamir Munir	GD(P)	Chief Instructor, Allied Officers Division (CI AOD), National Defence University (NDU), Islamabad	Sitara-e-Imtiaz (Military)	2028
27	Ahmad Juniad	Engg	Director General, Aerospace Engineering, (DG AE), AHQ Islamabad	Sitara-e-Imtiaz (Military); Tamgha-e-Imtiaz (Military)	2028
28	Usman Riaz	Engg	Director General, Electronics, National Aerospace Science and Technology Park (DG Electronics, NASTP), Rawalpindi	Sitara-e-Imtiaz (Military)	2028
29	Burhan Aziz	Engg	Advisor (Technical) to Chief of the Air Staff, AHQ, Islamabad	Sitara-e-Imtiaz (Military)	2028
30	Sajjad Noori	GD(P)	Director General, Air Operations (DG AO), AHQ, Islamabad	Sitara-e-Imtiaz (Military); Tamgha-e-Imtiaz (Military)	2028
31	Asim Rana	GD(P)	Air Officer Commanding, Central Air Command (AOC CAC), Lahore	Sitara-e-Imtiaz (Military); Tamgha-e-Imtiaz (Military)	2028
32	Syed Inam Ullah	GD(P)	Director General, Welfare & Rehabilitation (DG W & R), AHQ, Islamabad	Sitara-e-Imtiaz (Military); Tamgha-e-Imtiaz (Military)	2028
33	Zeeshan Saeed	GD(P)	Director General, Pakistan Airports Authority (DG PAA), Karachi	Sitara-e-Imtiaz (Military); Tamgha-e-Imtiaz (Military)	2028
34	Ahsan Yousaf	GD(P)	Director General Air Intelligence (DG AI), AHQ, Islamabad	Sitara-e-Imtiaz (Military); Tamgha-e-Imtiaz (Military)	2028
35	---	GD (P)	Additional Secretary-II (Air Force), Ministry of Defence, (AS-II MoD), Rawalpindi	Sitara-e-Imtiaz (Military); Tamgha-e-Imtiaz (Military)	2028
36	Muhammad Owais Akram	Engg	Deputy Chairman Pakistan Aeronautical Complex, PAC Kamra	Sitara-e-Imtiaz (Military)	2028

== See also ==
- Federal Secretary
- Grade 22
- List of serving Generals of the Pakistan Army
- List of serving Admirals of the Pakistan Navy
