= Moazzam Ilyas =

Rear Admiral Moazzam Ilyas HI(M) SI(M)
- محمد معظم الياس
- Born: 10 May 1965 (age 61); Lahore, Pakistan
- Military career
- Allegiance: Pakistan
- Branch: Pakistan Navy
- Service years: 1984 - 2021
- Rank: Rear Admiral
- Unit: Naval Operations Branch
- Commands: Director General Joint Warfare & Training, JSHQ; Commander, Coastal Areas (COMCOAST); Commander, Central Punjab (COMCEP); Commander, Northern Areas (COMNOR); Commandant Pakistan Naval War College (CO PNWC); Commander CTF-150; Chairman of Port Qasim Authority(PQA)
- Conflicts: 2001-2002 India-Pakistan standoff 2016 India-Pakistan military confrontation India–Pakistan border skirmishes (2019)
- Awards: Hilal-e-Imtiaz (Military); Sitara-e-Imtiaz (Military)

Muhammad Moazzam Ilyas HI(M) SI(M) (Urdu: محمد معظم الياس; b. 10 May 1965) is a retired rear admiral of the Pakistan Navy. His last appointment was Director General Joint Warfare and Training (DG JW&T) at Joint Staff Headquarters (JSHQ). He is currently the Chairman of Port Qasim Authority (PQA).

== Biography ==
Moazzam Ilyas joined the Pakistan and got commission in operations branch (communication) in 1984. He is a graduate of Joint Command and Staff College Shrivenham, UK. He has master's degrees in Defence Studies from King's College London, and Strategic Studies from Quaid-e-Azam University, Islamabad.

== Commands and Military Life ==
His command appointments include commands of two Destroyers PNS Badr & PNS Babur as well as three missile boats named PNS Jalalat, Himmat and Haibat. He has also served as Naval and Air Attache at Tehran, Iran from 2006 to 2009. From there, he was promoted to Commodore in 2009.

Ashore he has served as Assistant Chief of Naval Staff Operations (ACNS-Ops), Chief Staff Officer to Commander Pakistan Fleet (CSO to COMPAK), as well as Assistant Chief of Naval Staff Plans (ACNS-P). Afterwards, he was appointed to Commander North (COMNOR), from where he was promoted to rear admiral.

Rear Admiral Moazzam took over command of Combined Task Force 150 from August 2015 to January 2016.

He went to become Chief Instructor, Allied Officers Division at the NDU (CI-AOD). He was made Deputy Chief of Naval Staff Training and Evaluation (DCNS T&E) in 2016 and then served as Commandant of the PNWC and Commander Central Punjab (COMCEP) in Lahore.

He was appointed Commander Coastal Areas (COMCOAST) from 1 November 2017.

He was shifted to Joint Staff Headquarters (JSHQ) on 20 January 2019 as Director General Joint Warfare & Training (DG JW&T). He is also a member of Joint Chiefs of Staff Committee. He was also President, Services Sports Control Board at Joint Staff Headquarters.

== Public Service ==
He has voiced his point on view on various occasions of maritime and naval affairs on public television.

He was appointed the Chairman of Port Qasim Authority (PQA) since 21 November 2024.

== Awards and decorations ==

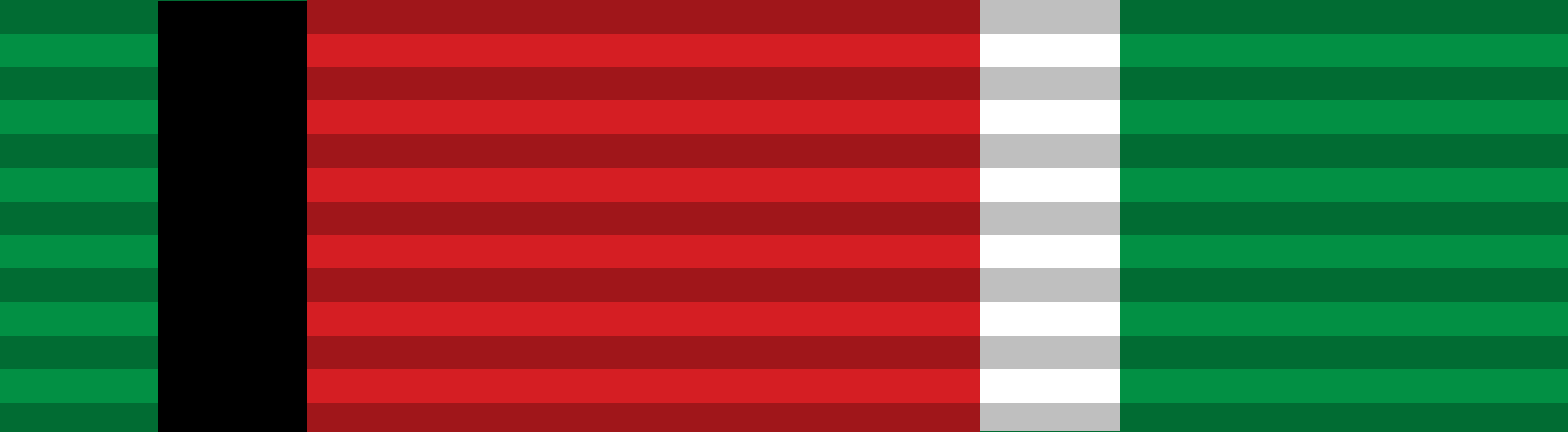

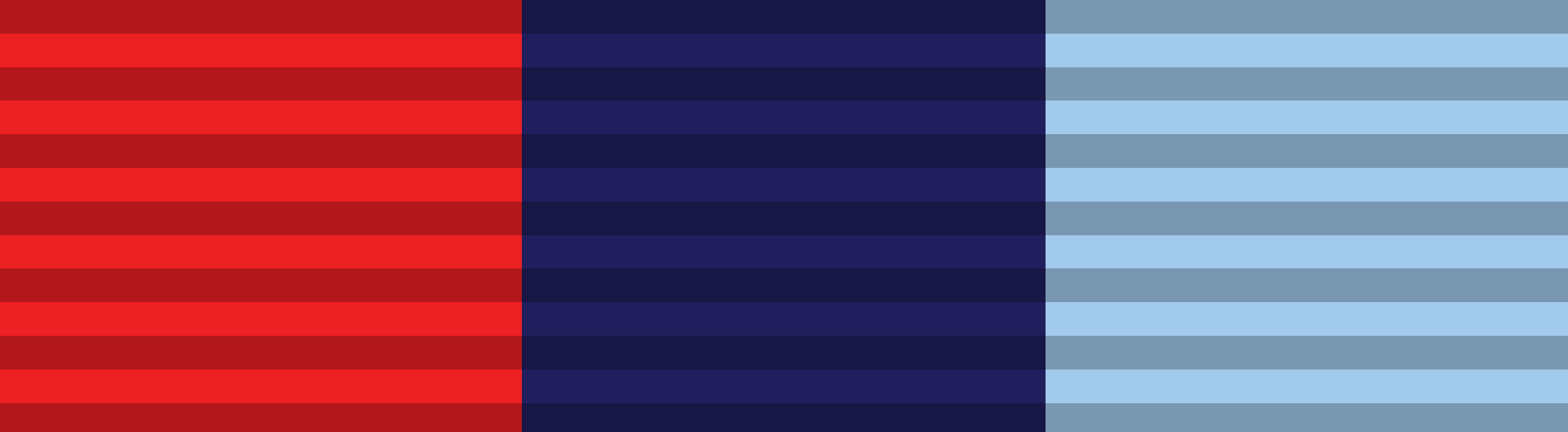

| Hilal-e-Imtiaz (Military) (Crescent of Excellence) | | Sitara-e-Imtiaz (Military) (Star of Excellence) | |
| Tamgha-e-Baqa (Nuclear Test Medal) 1998 | Tamgha-e-Istaqlal Pakistan (Escalation with India Medal) 2002 | Tamgha-e-Azm (Medal of Conviction) (2018) | 10 Years Service Medal |
| 20 Years Service Medal | 30 Years Service Medal | 35 Years Service Medal | 40 Years Service Medal |
| Hijri Tamgha (Hijri Medal) 1979 | Jamhuriat Tamgha (Democracy Medal) 1988 | Qarardad-e-Pakistan Tamgha (Resolution Day Golden Jubilee Medal) 1990 | Tamgha-e-Salgirah Pakistan (Independence Day Golden Jubilee Medal) 1997 |
