= Port Qasim =

Deep-water seaport in Karachi, Pakistan

Port Muhammad Bin Qasim
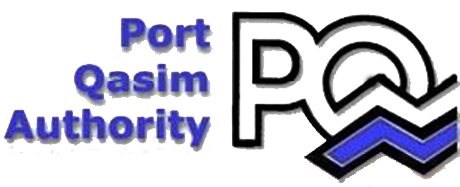

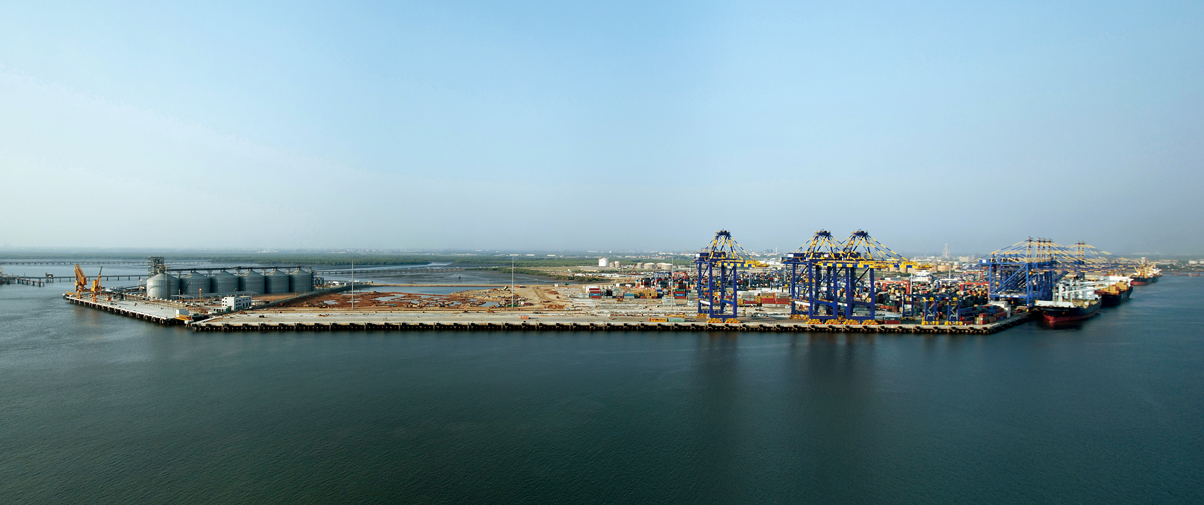
- Port Qasim
- Interactive map of Port Muhammad Bin Qasim
- Location within Pakistan

Location
- Country: Pakistan
- Location: Karachi-75020, Sindh
- Coordinates: 24°46′N 67°20′E
- UN/LOCODE: PKBQM

Details
- Opened: September 1980
- Operated by: Port Qasim Authority
- Owned by: Ministry of Ports and Shipping and Government of Pakistan
- Type of Harbor: Artificial
- Land area: 4937.1 hectares
- No. of berths: 15
- Employees: 2,000 (1,576 Staff and 279 Officers)
- Chairman: Rear Admiral (R) Moazzam Ilyas

Statistics
- Vessel arrivals: 1709 (FY 2020-21)
- Annual cargo tonnage: 58 million metric revenue tons including 21.62 million MT of dry cargo and 19.968 million MT of liquid cargo (FY 2020-21)
- Annual container volume: 1,258,000 [TEU]s with tonnage of 16.405 million MT (FY 2020-21)
- Tidal Variation: 0.5 to 3.5m (at channel mouth and port)
- Deadweight Tonnage: 75,000 DWT
- Ranking: 121st busiest container port (TEU Container Traffic) in 2007
- Website www.pqa.gov.pk

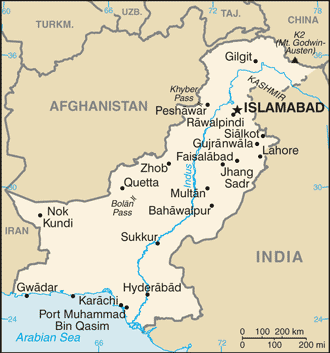
Map of Pakistan, showing Port Qasim and its sister ports of Karachi and Gwadar.

The Port Muhammad Bin Qasim (Urdu: محمد بن قاسم بندرگاہ Bandar-gāh Muhammad bin Qāsim), or Qasim Port Authority (Urdu: مقتدرہ قاسم بندرگاہ), also known as Port Qasim, is a deep-water seaport in Karachi, Sindh, Pakistan. It is located on the coastline of the Arabian Sea, and falls under the administrative control of the Maritime Secretary. It is Pakistan's second-busiest port, handling about 35% of the nation's cargo (17 million tons per annum). Port Qasim and the Port of Karachi, the busiest port of the country, together handle almost 90% of all external trade of Pakistan. The remaining maritime trade is routed through the Gwadar Port.

The port encompasses a total area of 49 square kilometres (12,000 acres) wherein many industrial zones operate. In addition to the Pakistan Steel Mills (PSM) and the KESC Bin Qasim Power Plant, around 80% of the Pakistan's automotive industry is located at Port Qasim. The port also provides direct waterfront access to two major nearby industrial areas – Export Processing Zone (Landhi) and Korangi Industrial Area. Approximately 60% of country's export and import is originated from these areas.

Port Qasim is managed by the Port Qasim Authority, a semi-autonomous government body.

== History ==
In the 1970s, as a part of Pakistani Prime Minister Zulfikar Ali Bhutto's program for economic reforms and establishment of heavy industries. The country's first steel mill, Pakistan Steel Mills, was established in the southern city of Karachi. A purpose-built specialised port facility was also decided to be established for bulk handling of the massive imports of raw materials, including iron ore and coal, for steel production by the Steel Mill. In addition to the future economic demands and strategic needs, this port was also meant to relieve congestion at the only seaport (Port of Karachi) of the country. This port was named as Port Muhammad bin Qasim (also known as Port Qasim), after the Arab invader Muhammad bin Qasim who conquered Debal and the coastal areas of Sindh in around 712 CE.

== Location ==
Port Qasim is located, adjacent to the Bin Qasim, in the southern part of the Malir District, in Karachi Division, in Sindh. It is located in an old channel of the Indus River at a distance of 35 kilometres east of Karachi city center.

The geographic position of the Port Qasim places it in close proximity to major shipping routes. The approach to the port is along a 45-kilometre long Navigation Channel which provides safe navigation for vessels up to 75,000 tonnes deadweight (DWT).

Location of the Port Qasim makes it very well connected to the transportation infrastructure of the country. It is at distance of only 15 km from the national highway, providing direct access to the hinterland through road. A further 14 km of railway track inside the terminal links it to the national railway network through 6 railway tracks. Jinnah International Airport is also very near, at a distance of 22 km.

Port Qasim's residential area is a neighbourhood of Bin Qasim of Karachi.

== Land allocation for port and industrial zones ==
The total area of the port comprises 14.2 km^{2} with an adjacent 35 km^{2} industrial estate. Port Qasim has been divided into three main zones as following:

Zone	Total Area (hectares)	Area Reserved for Port Services (hectares)	Area Reserved for Industrial Use (hectares)
North Western Industrial Zone (NWIZ)	1181.6	365.8	815.8
South Western Industrial Zone (SWIZ)	404.6	50.7	353.8
Eastern Industrial Zone (EIZ)	3358.8	1007.6	2351.2
Total	4945.2	1424.2	3520.7

Map of southeastern coastal strip of Karachi, showing Port Qasim and mangrove forests

== Terminal facilities ==
Currently Port Qasim is offering following facilities:

Facility	Berths	Berth Length	Owned by	Deadweight tonnage DWT
Multipurpose Terminal	4	200 m	PQA	35,000
Dirty Bulk Terminal		460 m	Pakistan International Bulk Terminal Limited (PIBT)	
Container Terminal	3 (Terminal 1) + 2 (Terminal 2)	712 m (Terminal) + 615 m (Terminal 2)	Qasim International Container Terminal	45,000
Liquid Chemical Terminal	1	TBC	Engro Vopak Terminal Limited	75,000
Oil Terminal	1	TBC	Fotco Oil Terminal	75,000

Night navigation facilities are available at the port, handling up to vessels of LOA 202 meters during night.

== Expansion projects ==
Port Qasim has planned for a major expansion in coming years with FDI of US$1.22 billion approximately. Major expansion projects of the port are as following:

Project	Capacity	Budget	Completion Year
Liquid Cargo terminal	4 million MT/year	US$15 million	2009
2nd Container Terminal	1.175 million TEUs/year	US$250 million	2011
GasPort LNG Floating Terminal	3 million MT/year	US$160 million	2010
Grain & Fertilizer Terminal	4 million MT/year	US$100 million	2011
Coal, Clinker & Cement Terminal	8 million MT/year	US$180 million	2011
Granada LNG Terminal	3.5 million MT/year	US$274 million	2012
2nd Oil Terminal	9 million MT/year	US$51.4 million	2012
2nd Steel Jetty	8 million MT/year	US$150 million	TBC
Deepening & Widening of navigation Channel		US$150 million	TBC
Construction of a fly over and dual carriage way		Rs. 2 billion	TBC
Infrastructure Development works in Eastern Industrial Zone		Rs. 8.8 billion	TBC
Textile City with Power Plant & Waste Water Treatment Plant		Rs. 8.7 billion	TBC

== Integrated cargo container control (IC3) facility ==
The country's first Integrated Cargo Container Control (IC3) facility is being constructed at Port Qasim with a joint investment over US$8 million by Pakistan Customs and the US Customs and Border Protection.

The purpose of the IC3 programme is to enhance international maritime trade security considering post 9/11 security issues. The IC3 programme envisages joint screening of US-bound containerised cargo from Pakistan via live video link by the customs authorities of Pakistan and the US. The US Customs will not subject the screened cargo to re-examination on arrival at US ports. This facility will support trade in terms of reduced time and cost of shipments.

== Environmental issues ==
=== Mangrove forest ===
Port Qasim is located on the northwest edge of the Indus Delta system. The system is characterised by long and narrow creeks, mud flats and the Indus River Delta-Arabian Sea mangroves, one of the largest mangrove forest ecosystems found in an arid climate. In 1972 eight species of mangrove trees were recorded from Pakistan, however, only four continue to thrive. Several species of reptiles, birds, and terrestrial mammals inhabit the project area, wherever suitable habitats are found. These are constantly under threat due to increased shipping and industrial activities in the area.

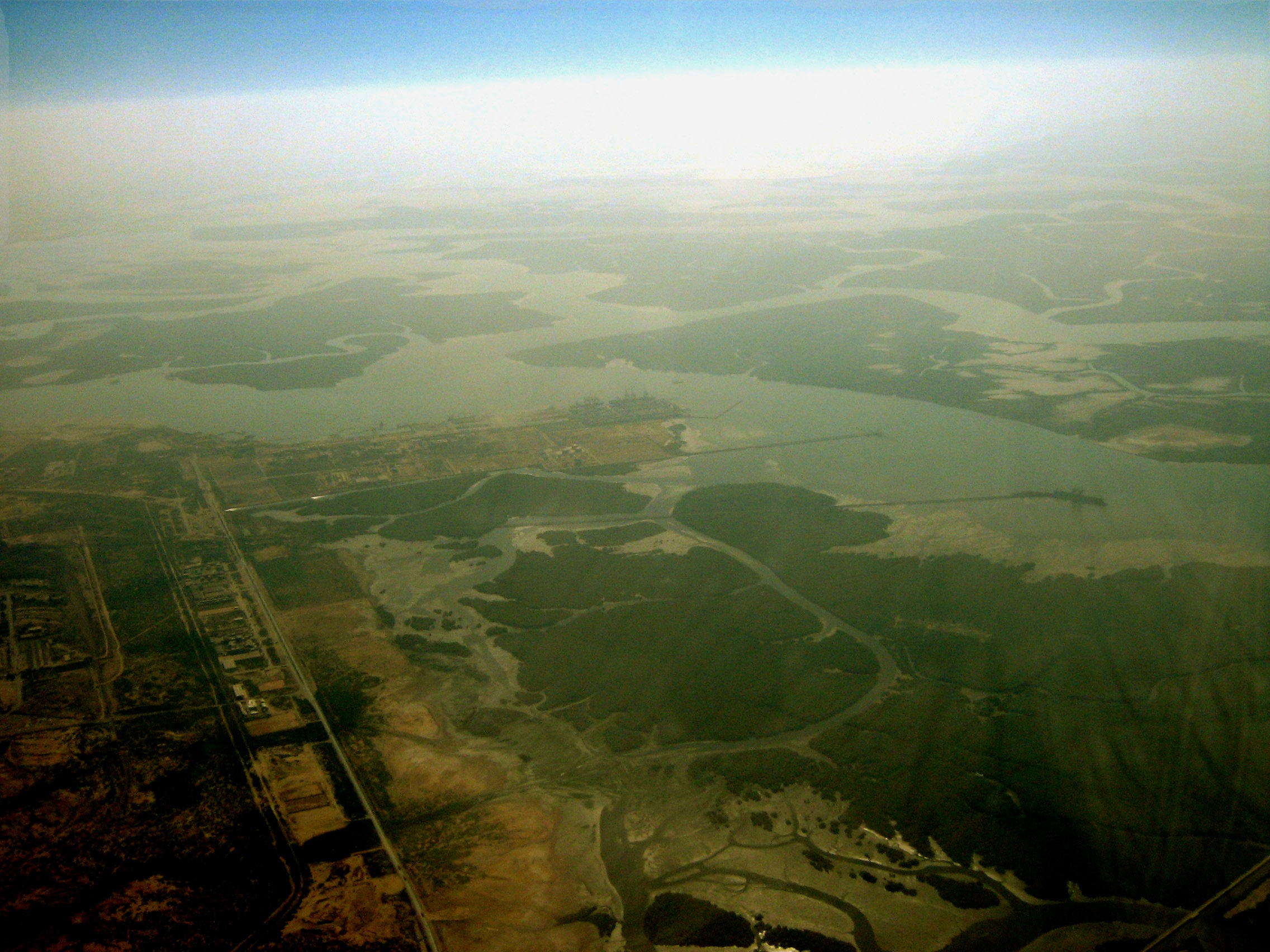
Aerial picture of Port Qasim, with surrounding Mangrove forests.

WWF Pakistan has taken a mangrove conservation initiative recognising the social, ecological and economic significance of the mangrove forests in the coastal areas of Sindh and Balochistan. As a part of this, initiative has been taken on conservation of the mangrove ecosystem in the Korangi – Phitti Creek system, in the Indus Delta (including Port Qasim area). The project aims to conserve selected degraded mangrove forests in the Korangi – Phitti creek area through involvement of community, local schoolchildren and other stakeholders like Port Qasim Authority and the Government Forest Department.

=== Tasman oil spill 2003 at Karachi Beach ===
In August 2003, the beach immediately west of the Port Qasim navigation channel was the scene of a major oil spillage when the Greek-registered Tasman Spirit ran aground. The environmental impact included large numbers of dead fish and turtles and a key mangrove forest, as well as dozens of people suffering nausea. At that time, it was feared that this incident will harm the coastal life in the Port Qasim area, however no major impact was observed near the Phitti Creek (waterway entrance to Port Qasim).

=== Pollution-free terminal ===
Recently Port Qasim Authority (PQA) has announced that an implementation agreement is being signed for the development of a 'pollution-free' Coal, Cement and Clinker Terminal (CCCT) worth $175 million with a handling capacity of up to eight million tons per year at port. This step would save the environment from irreparable damages and the health of the port workforce and nearby populations from serious respiratory diseases which would have been a serious threat if the powdery coal was handled in open/bulk on berths at port.

== See also ==
- List of ports in Pakistan
- Port of Karachi
- Port of Gwadar
- Keti Bandar
- List of seaports
- Bin Qasim
- Buddo Island
- Bundal Island
- Port Qasim Authority
- Port Qasim Authority cricket team
- Ministry of Maritime Affairs
