= Shifaat Ali Khan =

Pakistan Navy rear admiral

Rear Admiral Shifaat Ali Khan HI(M) SI(M) TI(M)
- Education: National Defence University; Naval War College; Pakistan Navy War College
- Military career
- Allegiance: Pakistan
- Branch: Pakistan Navy
- Service years: 1988-present
- Rank: Rear Admiral
- Commands: Flag Officer Sea Training (FOST); Commander Central Punjab (COMCEP); Pakistan Navy War College; Commander 10th Patrol Craft Squadron (COMPATRON-10); PNS SHAHJAHAN; PNS MUNSIF
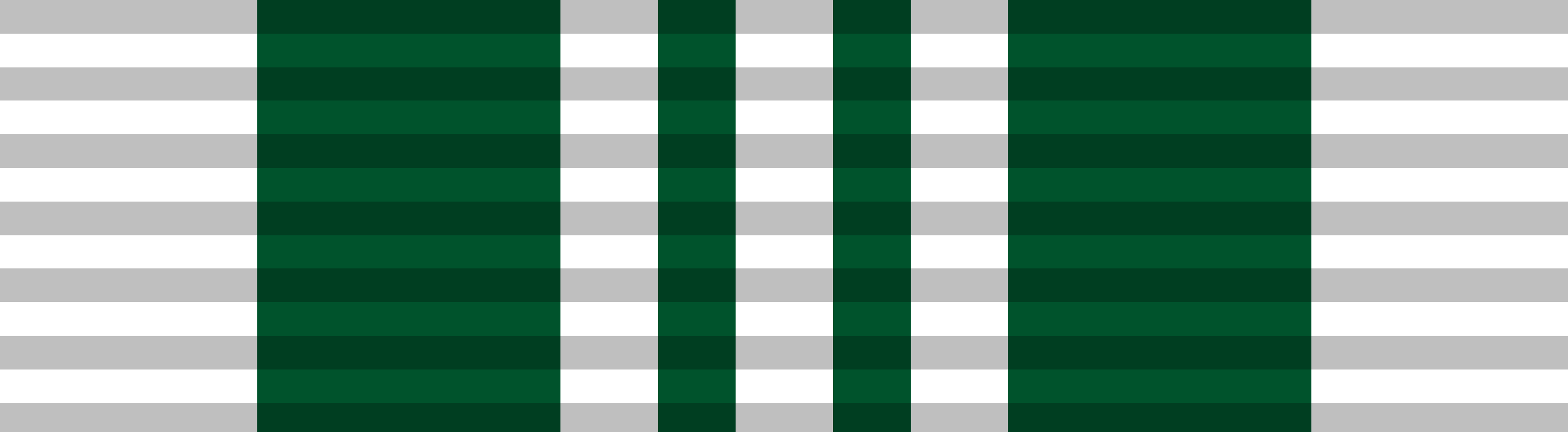
- Awards: Hilal-e-Imtiaz (Military); Sitara-e-Imtiaz (Military); Tamgha-e-Imtiaz (Military)

Shifaat Ali Khan HI(M) is a vice admiral of the Pakistan Navy, currently serving as the Deputy Chief of the Naval Staff, Operations (DCNS-O).

== Education ==
Shifaat is an alumnus of the Pakistan Navy War College Lahore, the National Defence University Islamabad, and the Naval War College in the United States.

== Career ==
Commissioned into the Operations Branch of the Pakistan Navy in January 1993, Shifaat has acquired extensive experience through various Command and Staff appointments. His command roles include serving as the Commanding Officer of PNS MUNSIF, PNS SHAHJAHAN, Commander of the 10th Patrol Craft Squadron, Commandant of the PN War College, the Commander Central Punjab (COMCEP) and the Flag Officer Sea Training (FOST). In staff positions, he has served as Staff Officer (Operations) to the Commander 25th Destroyer Squadron, Fleet Operation Officer to Commander Pakistan Fleet, Staff Officer Operation at HQ NAVCENT Bahrain, Officer Incharge of PN Operations School, and Naval Attaché in Beijing, China.

== Awards and decorations ==
In recognition of his meritorious services, Rear Admiral Shifaat Ali Khan has been honored with the Hilal-e-Imtiaz (Military) and Sitara-e-Imtiaz (Military).

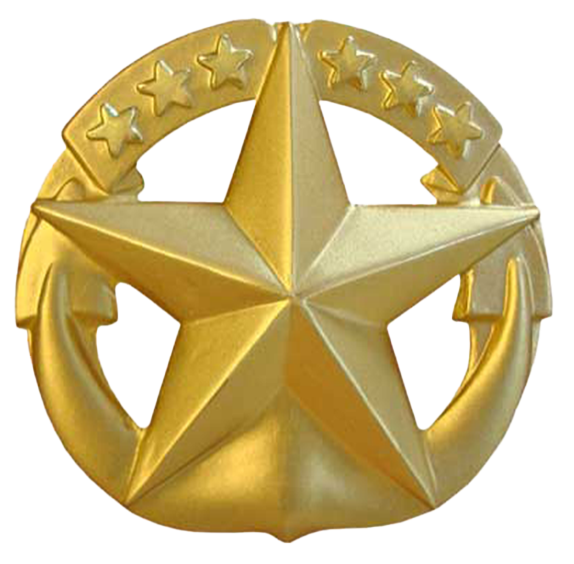

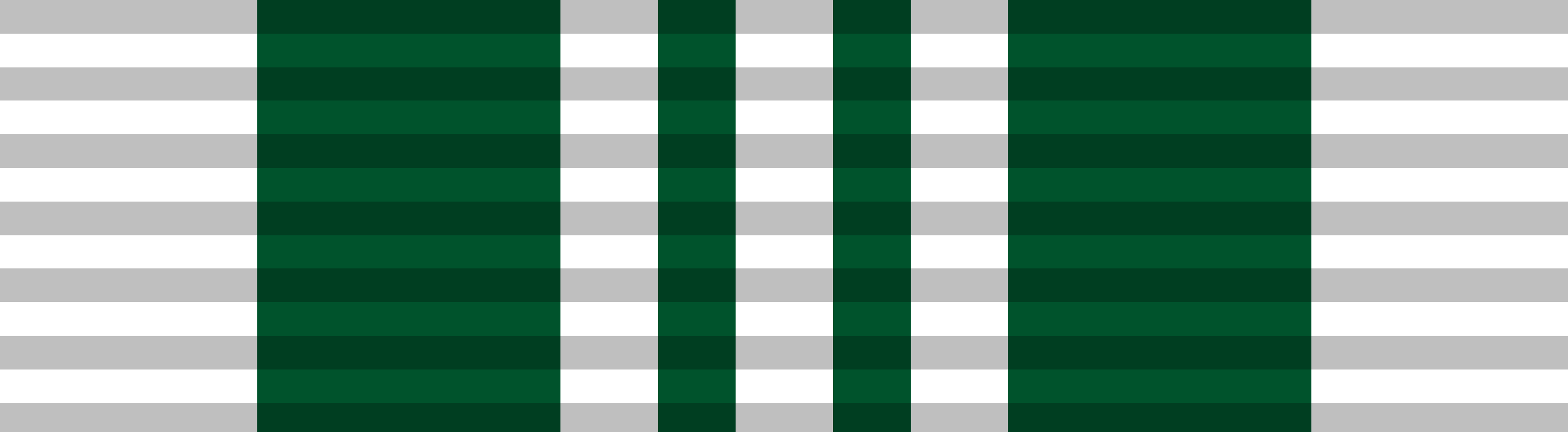

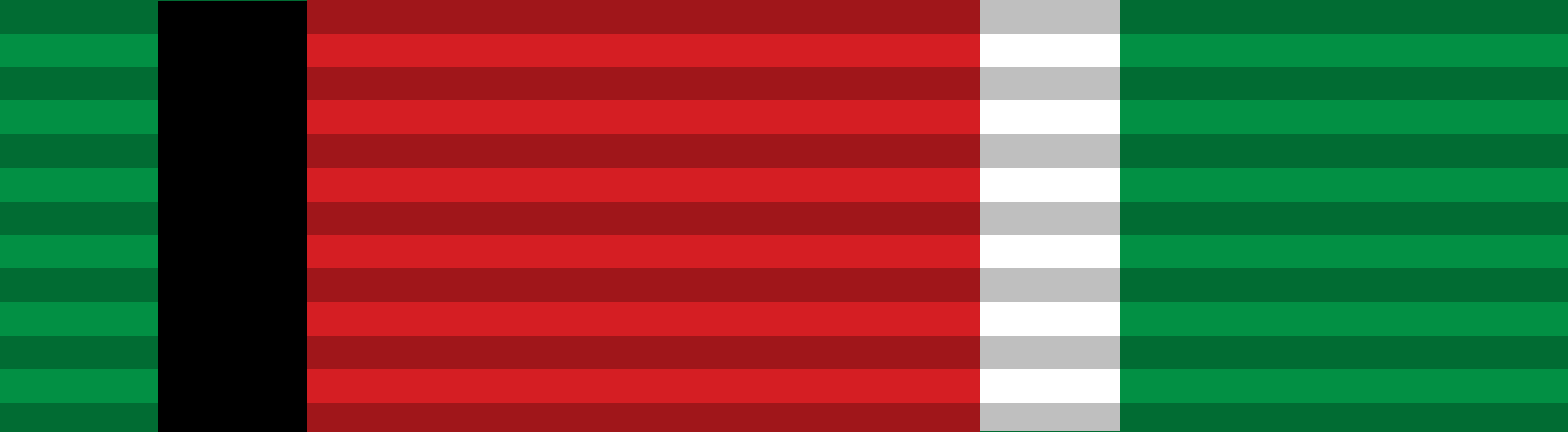

Pakistan Navy Operations Branch Badge
Command at Sea insignia
Hilal-e-Imtiaz (Military) (Crescent of Excellence)	Sitara-e-Imtiaz (Military) (Star of Excellence)	Tamgha-e-Imtiaz (Military) (Medal of Excellence)	Tamgha-e-Baqa (Nuclear Test Medal) 1998
Tamgha-e-Istaqlal Pakistan (Escalation with India Medal) 2002	Tamgha-e-Azm (Medal of Conviction) (2018)	10 Years Service Medal	20 Years Service Medal
30 Years Service Medal	Jamhuriat Tamgha (Democracy Medal) 1988	Qarardad-e-Pakistan Tamgha (Resolution Day Golden Jubilee Medal) 1990	Tamgha-e-Salgirah Pakistan (Independence Day Golden Jubilee Medal) 1997
