= S Fauad Masud Hatmi =

Pakistani military officer

- Allegiance: Pakistan
- Branch: Pakistan Air Force
- Rank: Air Marshal
- Commands: Base Commander PAF Base Mushaf; Commander Northern Air Command; DCAS ( I&E) Pakistan Air Force
- Awards: Hilal-e-Imtiaz (Military) Sitara-e-Imtiaz (Military) Tamgha-e-Basalat
- Alma mater: Pakistan Air Force Academy

S. Fauad Masud Hatmi is a serving senior officer in the Pakistan Air Force who is holding appointment of DCAS(Inspection & Evaluation) at Air Headquarters, Islamabad.

== Military career ==
Hatmi was commissioned into the General Duties (Pilot) Branch of the Pakistan Air Force.

Hatmi served at the No. 11 Squadron PAF. He was sent to abroad as foreign deputation, serving as Air Attache at Paris. During Operation Swift Retort, he was the base commander of the PAF Base Mushaf. In July 2020, he was promoted from Air Commodore to the rank of Air Vice Marshal. He served as Air Officer Commanding of the Southern Air Command. He commanded the Northern Air Command as well.

In 2022, he was promoted to the rank of Air Marshal.

Hatmi has been awarded numerous awards throughout his career, including Hilal-i-Imtiaz, Sitara-i-Imtiaz and the Tamgha-i-Basalat.
