= Pakistan Maritime Security Agency =

Pakistan Navy's Law Enforcement Agency

Pakistan Maritime Security Agency پاکستان بحری سلامتی ایجنسی
- Pakistan Maritime Security Agency racing stripes

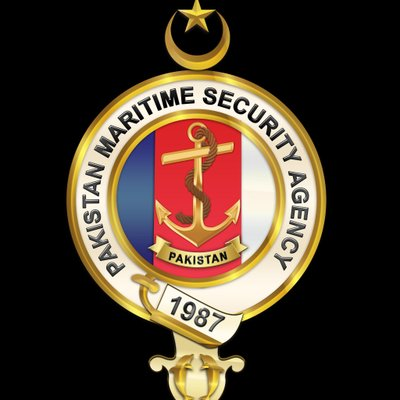
- Emblem of PMSA
- Abbreviation: PMSA
- Motto: Indeed ALLAH is with us

Agency overview
- Formed: 1 January 1987; 39 years ago
- Employees: 2,000 active duty personnel

Jurisdictional structure
- Operations jurisdiction: Pakistan
- Constituting instrument: Maritime Security Agency Act, 1994.
- Specialist jurisdiction: Coastal patrol, marine border protection, marine search and rescue

Operational structure
- Headquarters: HQs Pakistan Maritime Security Agency,Plot No 34-A, Dockyard Road, Karachi, Sindh, Pakistan
- Agency executives: Adm Naveed Ashraf, Chief of Naval staff; R/Adm Shahzad Iqbal HI(M), Director-General
- Parent agency: Pakistan Navy

Facilities
- Vessels: 23 vessels
- Aircraft: 3 aircraft

Notables
- Significant Battle: See list; Indo-Pakistani wars and conflicts; Kargil War in 1999; Indo-Pakistani standoff in 2001; Indo-Pakistani standoff in 2008; Indo-Pakistani skirmishes in 2014 War on terror; War in Afghanistan; NATO logistics in the Afghan War; Piracy off the coast of Somalia; Piracy in the Persian Gulf
- Anniversary: 1 January

Website
- www.pmsa.gov.pk

The Pakistan Maritime Security Agency (reporting name: PMSA) (Urdu: پاکستان بحری سلامتی ایجنسی) is a branch of the Pakistan Navy. It is a Navy-managed and Navy-controlled Marine law enforcement agency whose mission is to provide protection to Pakistan's maritime interests and enforcement of maritime law with jurisdiction over the domestic and international waters of Pakistan including the exclusive economic zone. The Pakistan Maritime Security Agency is distinct from Pakistan Coast Guards, which is a Civil Armed Force under the Ministry of Interior.

Created on 1 January 1987 in compliance with the UN Convention on Law of the Sea of 1982, the PMSA functions as a federal regulatory agency under the Ministry of Defence (MoD) whose command level leadership and personnel comes directly from the Pakistan Navy. Apart from enforcing maritime law, the PMSA assists in operations against human trafficking, smuggling, and deep sea search and rescue.

The leadership of the agency comes from the external billets appointment approved by the Pakistan Navy and its executive officer is designated as the Director-General who usually at the two-star rank admiral a senior flag officer of Rear Admiral rank in the Navy. The current director of the agency is Rear Admiral Shahzad Iqbal who took the directorship of the agency in 2024.

Since 2014, the mission objectives and area of responsibility of the PMSA has expanded substantially like to provide maritime protection to the China-Pakistan Economic Corridor.

== Mission ==
The mission of Pakistan Maritime Security Agency states:

"To assert and enforce national jurisdiction and sovereignty in all Maritime zones of Pakistan and to protect Pakistan's Maritime interests"

— Pakistan Maritime Security Agency,

== History ==
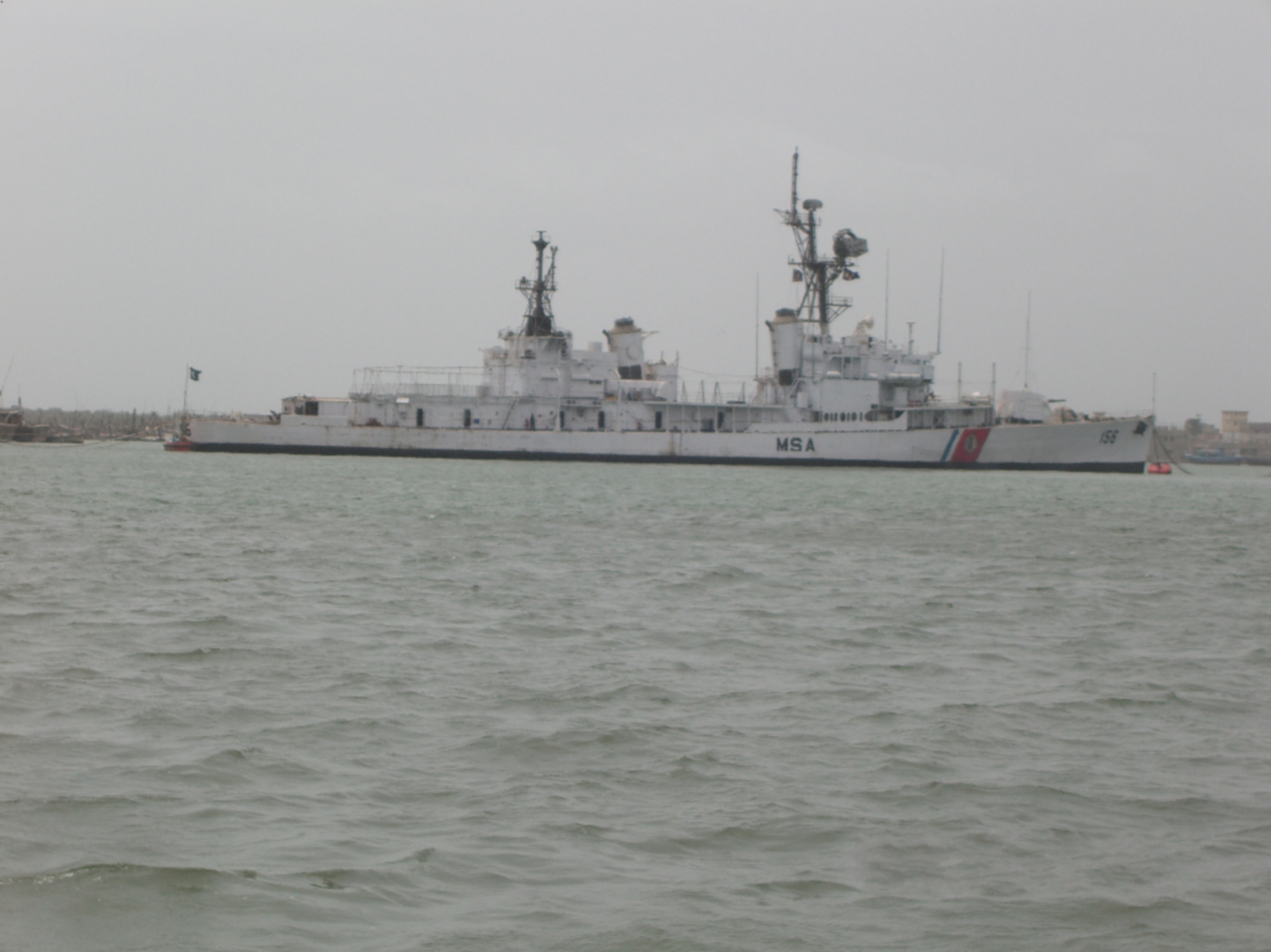
The PMSS Nazim 156, the former PNS Nazim destroyer, anchored at the Karachi dockyard in 1999, now serves as an "on sea" headquarters and is now considered non-operational and hasn't been moved in years.

In 1971, the Ministry of Defence (MoD) had established the Pakistan Coast Guard but the Coast Guards were under the command of the Pakistan Army and were unable to perform the deep sea search and rescue operations or enforce maritime law to protect Pakistan's maritime interests. The void had been filled by the Indian Navy and the Indian Coast Guard that had been very active in the Indian Ocean. The Navy had to perform the coast guard duties apart from the combat service and had to deploy its assets to guard the maritime interests of the country.

After the United Nations' Convention on the Law of the Sea was signed in 1982, the Government of Pakistan established the Maritime Security Agency (PMSA) after acquiring the Exclusive Economic Zone (EEZ) of about 240,000 square miles (620,000 km^{2}). The MoD established the Maritime Affairs Wing in 1986 to lay the framework of the agency as the Pakistan Navy undertook the task by establishing the agency from its manpower and provided the leadership with Rear-Admiral S.R. Hussain becoming its first Director-General on 1 August 1986.

On 1 January 1987, the Pakistan Maritime Security Agency (PMSA) was established for law enforcement and protecting the maritime interests of the country, and a parliamentary act that was passed in 1994 to provide the legal jurisdiction to the agency to perform its operations and task. In 1997, the MSA gained its constitutional mandate after ratification of the Convention on the Law of the Sea.

The Maritime Security Agency conducts exercises with the other coast guards of the world. In May 2005, the PMSA agreed to establish liaison links with the Indian Coast Guard.

== Roles and functions ==
Pakistan Maritime Security Agency has roles in maritime homeland security, national and international maritime law enforcement (MLE), search and rescue (SAR), marine environmental protection (MEP), and the maintenance of intracoastal and offshore aids to navigation (ATON). The agency is mandate to protect the fishing vessels and crew against any threat within the Maritime Zones (MZ). The PMSA also captures ships smuggling illegal products and drugs.

The agency performs military operations authorized by the Ministry of Defence to protect the economic and maritime interests of Pakistan. The agency also provides security and assists governmental agencies, international organizations and the Pakistan Navy in petroleum and other mineral exploration in Pakistan's naval zones. The agency coordinates the oceanographic research and other scientific activities of the Navy Hydrographic Department.

== BARRACUDA exercises ==
BARRACUDA series of exercises are undertaken by Pakistan Maritime Security Agency to counter marine pollution of Pakistani waters. The exercises involve multiple stakeholders including Pakistan Navy, Pakistan Air Force, Karachi Port Trust, Port Qasim Authority, Gwadar Port Authority and other stakeholders.

=== BARRACUDA-XIII ===
BARRACUDA-XIII was held from December 9–11, 2025. The exercise demonstrated preparedness around oil spill containment, counter-piracy, and search and rescue (SAR) operations. The exercise deployed air and sea assets of Pakistan Maritime Security Agency, Pakistan Navy, and Pakistan Airforce. Other national stakeholders including port authorities and oil companies were also involved. The exercise was witnessed by foreign observers including naval personnel from friendly countries.

== Organizational headquarters ==
The Pakistan Maritime Security Agency (PMSA) is a branch within the Navy, and is headquartered near the vicinity of the Karachi Fish Harbour and the KSEW Ltd. in Karachi, Sindh, Pakistan. Since it was established in 1987, the PMSA was headquartered in different hired commercial buildings, most notably, the Karachi Port Trust Building until the new headquarters were constructed and inaugurated on 15 January 2011.

Leadership and the personnel are directly appointed from the Navy and the agency consists of a Director-General and it is commanded by a two-star rank, a Rear Admiral seconded from Pakistan Navy. The headquarters of the agency and personnel are placed under the command of Commander of Coastal Areas (COMCOAST), who usually supervise the operations for the Ministry of Defence.

=== Commissioned officers and enlisted rank ===
The Maritime Security Agency is an agency within the Navy, therefore, it uses the same ranks and insignia as the Pakistan Navy as all of its members are active-duty personnel of the Navy.

Rank group	General/flag officers		Senior officers			Junior officers
Pakistan Maritime Security Agency
Pakistan Maritime Security Agency	Rear admiral بحریہ کا امیر	Commodore کموڈور	Captain کپتان	Commander کمانڈر	Lieutenant commander لیفٹیننٹ کمانڈر	Lieutenant لیفٹیننٹ	Sub-lieutenant سب لیفٹیننٹ۔	Midshipman مڈ شپ مین

Rank group	Junior commissioned officers			Non commissioned officer		Enlisted
Pakistan Maritime Security Agency							No insignia
Pakistan Maritime Security Agency	Master Chief Petty Officer ماسٹر چیف پیٹی آفیسر۔	Fleet Chief Petty Officer فلیٹ چیف پیٹی آفیسر۔	Chief Petty Officer چیف پیٹی آفیسر۔	Petty Officer چھوٹا افسر۔	Leading Seaman معروف سی مین۔	Able Tech-I قابل ٹیک- I۔	Ordinary Tech-II عام ٹیک II۔

== Equipment ==
=== Uniform ===
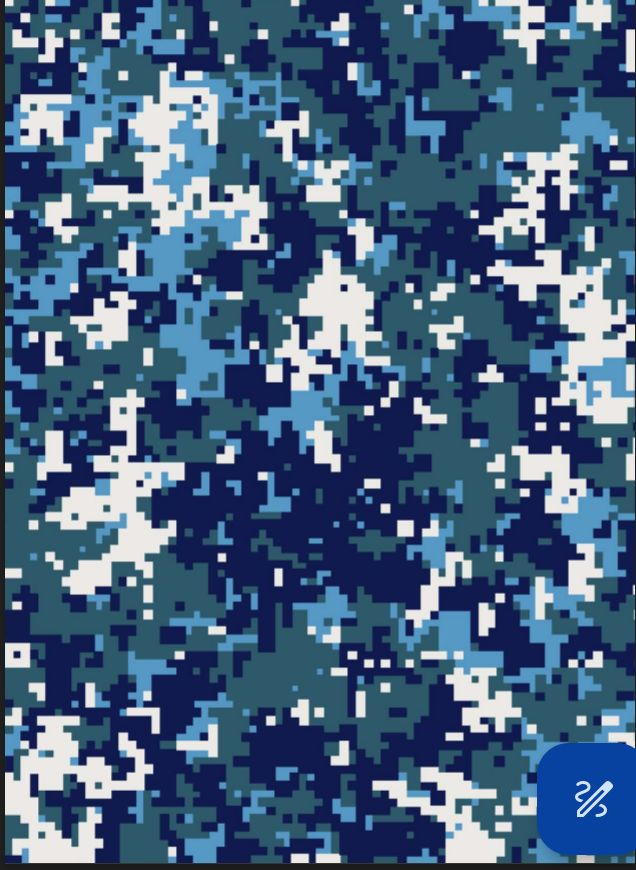
PMSA Camouflage

Pakistan Maritime Security Agency adopted its distinctive uniform on 11 July 2024.The uniform's design is listed at the page.

=== Vessels ===
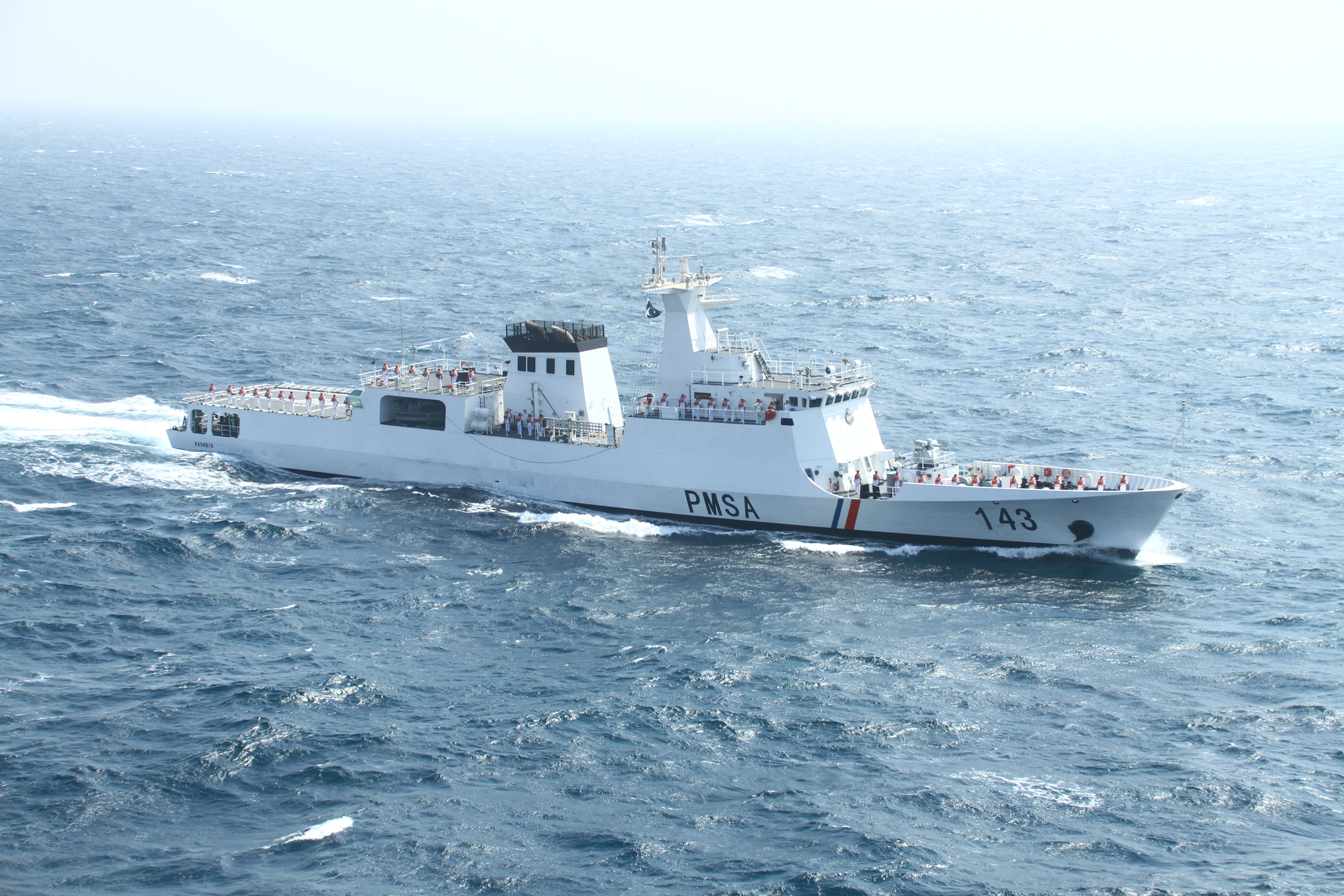
PMSS Kashmir (P-143)

Pakistan Maritime Security Agency operates several vessels built locally at KSEW Ltd. and in China's Huangpu and Xijiang shipyards The Pakistani PMSA operates under the Pakistan navy and operates in Pakistan naval stations and Pakistan naval officers . It also has some vessels transferred from the United States Coast Guard . PMSA currently operates three squadrons as listed below:

Squadron	Callsign	Vessels	Notes
22nd Offshore Patrol Squadron	COMOSRON 22	Hingol Class Corvettes, Barkat Class Corvettes, Kashmir Class Corvettes, Rafaqat Class Boats, PMSS Kashmir was laid on 16 August 2016 in Haungpu Shipyard and commissioned on 20 July 2018.; PMSS Zhob was built in Karachi Shipyard and Engineering Works (KS&EW) and commissioned on 9 August 2018.; PMSS Kolachi was built locally by KS&EW with assistance from China State Shipbuilding Corporation (CSSC) as part of a technology transfer agreement.; PMSS Hingol, Basol and Dasht were constructed at Xijiang Shipyard and subsequently commissioned between years 2016-2017.	
23rd Offshore Patrol Squadron	COMOSRON 23	9 × Defender-class Fast Response Boats; 2 × Zodiac Hurricane Boats	Inducted into PMSA after transferred by the United States to Pakistan.
Western Marine Wing	COMWMR	PMSS Nazim	Acquired from Pakistan Navy as "PNS Tariq". In U.S. service it was called "USS Wiltsie". Decommissioned as of 6 October 2010. The Nazim is an "on sea" headquarters and is now considered non-operational and hasn't been moved in years.

=== Aircraft ===
The Pakistan Maritime Security Agency operates one aircraft squadron known as Squadron 93 PMSA. The squadron was inaugurated on 23 June 1988 with the induction of a Fokker F27 Friendship an interim measure, for sea surveillance. The aircraft was stationed at Jinnah Terminal for the purpose of logistics support. In 1993, the PMSA acquired the Britten-Norman Defender stationed at Mehran Naval Air Station.

Squadron	Callsign	Aircraft	Notes
93rd PMSA Squadron	CO 93 SQN	3 × Britten-Norman Defender	Stationed in Naval Air Station Mehran

=== Bases ===
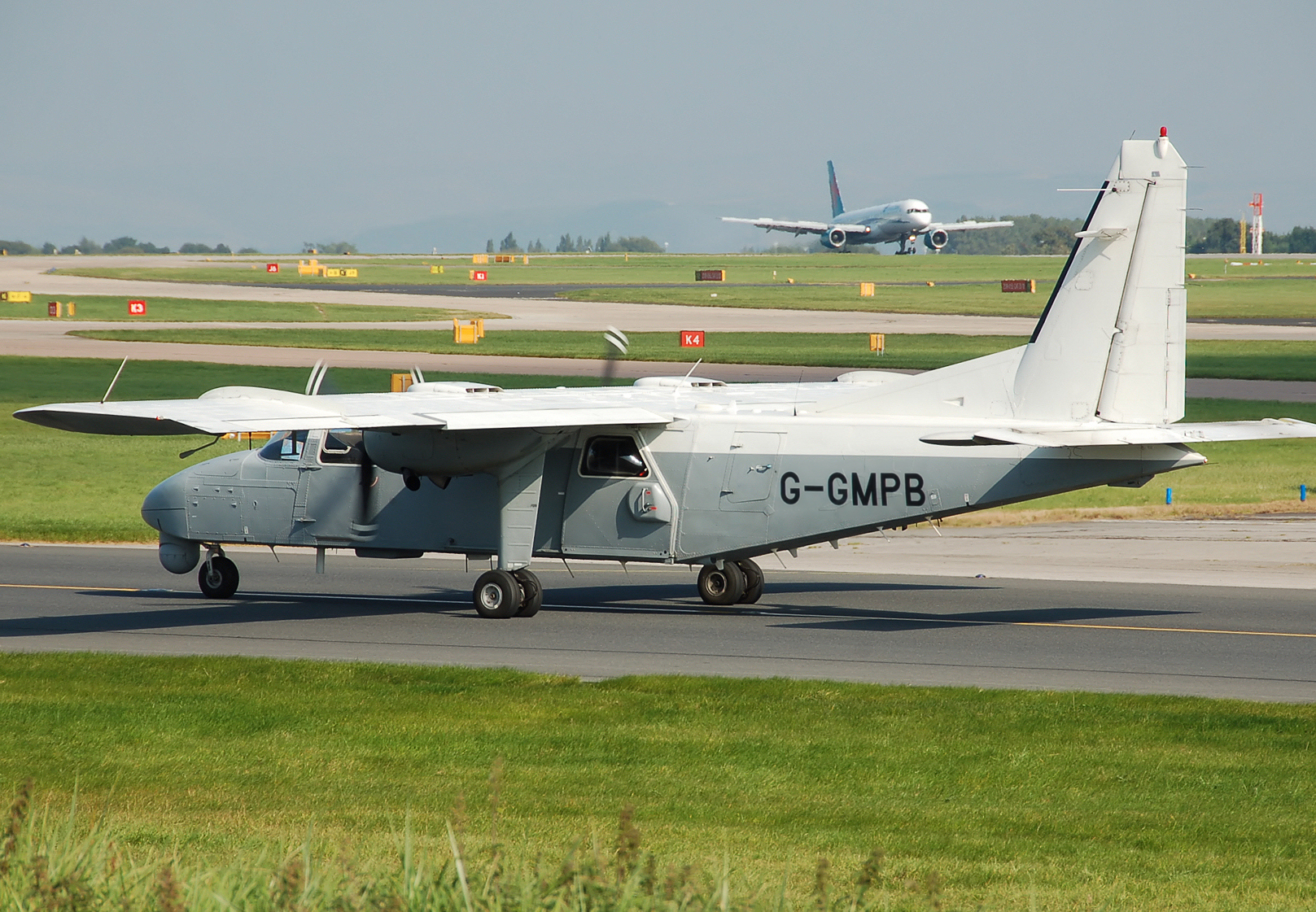
The PMSA operates three Defender aircraft similar to the one above in this photo.

PMSA currently operates from multiple bases namely:

- Headquarter PMSA Karachi Pakistan Navy dockyard
- Logistic Unit PMSA Indus
- PMSA Base Nazim ( floating ship base based in PN dockyard)
- PMSA Base Sadaqat (Korangi Fish Harbor)
- PMSA Base PNS Akram ( Gwader )
- PMSA Base Ormara ( Jinnah naval base )
- PMSA Base Rishad (Pasni)
- PMSA Base Keti Bandar
- Mehran Naval Air Station
