= Port Qasim Authority =

Government organization

- اداره بندر قاسم
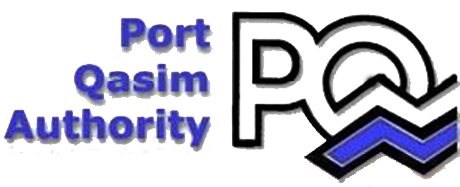
- Abbreviation: PQA
- Formation: 1973; 53 years ago
- Founder: Government of Pakistan
- Founded at: Pakistan
- Type: Government Authority
- Chairman: Rear Admiral Moazzam Ilyas
- Website: www.pqa.gov.pk

The Port Qasim Authority (PQA) is an authority in Pakistan established in 1973, responsible for managing Port Qasim, which is the second busiest port in the country.

== Establishment and legislation ==
The Port Qasim Authority was formed through the Port Qasim Authority Act, 1973 (Act No. XLIII of 1973). This legislation outlines the creation and operations of the Port Qasim Authority, detailing its roles, authority, internal structure, and regulations concerning the management and navigation within maritime and inland waterway ports.

In 2019, the cabinet has approved the delegation of authority to the Prime Minister for the appointment of the Port Qasim Authority's board of directors and oversight of board proceedings.

== Achievements and initiatives ==
=== Revenue ===
The Port Qasim Authority demonstrated robust financial performance in the past few years. During the fiscal year 2020–2021, the Authority experienced significant revenue growth of 29%, resulting in a net profit of 19.76 billion rupees.

=== Collaborations and partnerships ===
In 2018, the Port Qasim Authority entered into a significant Fuel Supply Agreement with Pakistan State Oil (PSO). This agreement outlined that PSO would fulfill all of PQA's fuel needs by providing Action Plus Diesel (HSD) and Altron Premium (PMG) for a period of three years.

The Port Qasim Authority has engaged in various collaborations and partnerships to enhance its operations. In 2023, the authority has discussed different avenues of collaboration with the National Logistics Cell (NLC).

== Controversies and challenges ==
=== Land Disputes and resolutions ===
In 2023, a disagreement arose between a party and the Pakistan Navy regarding a 1,217 hectare land located in Mirpur Sakro, Thatta. The matter was taken to the Sindh High Court, which instructed for a clear delineation of the land to address the dispute.

The Port Qasim Authority encountered difficulties regarding taxation, specifically regarding the general sales tax (GST) imposed by the Sindh government on the channel development cess (CDC) collected from vessels transporting liquefied natural gas (LNG). The Authority contemplated challenging this taxation issue.

== Chairmen ==
List of Office Holders
No.	Name	Term of office
1	Commodore Mahmoodul Hasan	29 June 1973 – 14 February 1974
2	Ardeshir Cowasjee	15 February 1974 – 1 September 1974
3	Commodore I.H. Malik	2 September 1974 – 26 June 1978
4	Vice Admiral S. M. Ahsan	27 June 1978 – 9 June 1980
5	Rear Admiral A. Waliulla	9 June 1980 – 20 August 1988
6	Rear Admiral Akbar H. Khan	21 August 1988 – 20 August 1991
7	Rear Admiral S. Wasi Haider	28 November 1991 – 1 September 1992
8	Syed Sardar Ahmed	28 April 1993 – 2 October 1993
9	M. Nawaz Tiwana	4 October 1993 – 2 April 1996
10	Muhammad Kaleem	19 August 1996 – 27 October 1997
11	Nazar Abbas Siddiqui	2 May 1998 – 13 August 1998
12	Nazar Mohammad Shaikh	22 October 1998 – 20 July 2000
13	M. Asad Arif	7 August 2000 – 13 November 2001
14	Rear Admiral Sikandar Viqar Naqvi	14 November 2001 – 25 November 2002
15	Vice Admiral Taj Muhammad Khatta	26 November 2002 – 4 November 2004
16	Rear Admiral Saleem Ahmed Mennai	5 November 2004 – 3 January 2006
17	Vice Admiral M. Asad Qureshi	14 January 2006 – 1 November 2007
18	Rear Admiral Syed Afzal	2 November 2007 – 7 August 2008
19	Mir Afsar Din Talpur	8 August 2008 – 27 May 2009
20	Vice Admiral (R) M. Asad Qureshi	28 May 2009 – 12 July 2010
21	Vice Admiral (R) Muhammad Shafi	12 July 2010 – 26 February 2013
22	Brigadier (Retd) Saeed Ahmed Khan	27 February 2013 – 10 July 2013
23	Agha Jan Akhtar	16 July 2013 – 28 December 2017
24	Najaf Quli Mirza	17 January 2018 – 16 April 2018
25	Asad Rafi Chandna	16 April 2018 – 12 July 2019
26	Rear Admiral (R) Syed Hasan Nasir Shah	2019–2024
27	Rear Admiral (R) Moazzam Ilyas	2024–present
