= Pakistan Coast Guards =

Pakistani maritime law enforcement agency

Pakistan Coast Guards ساحلی محافظان پاکستان
- Coat of arms of Pakistan Coast Guards

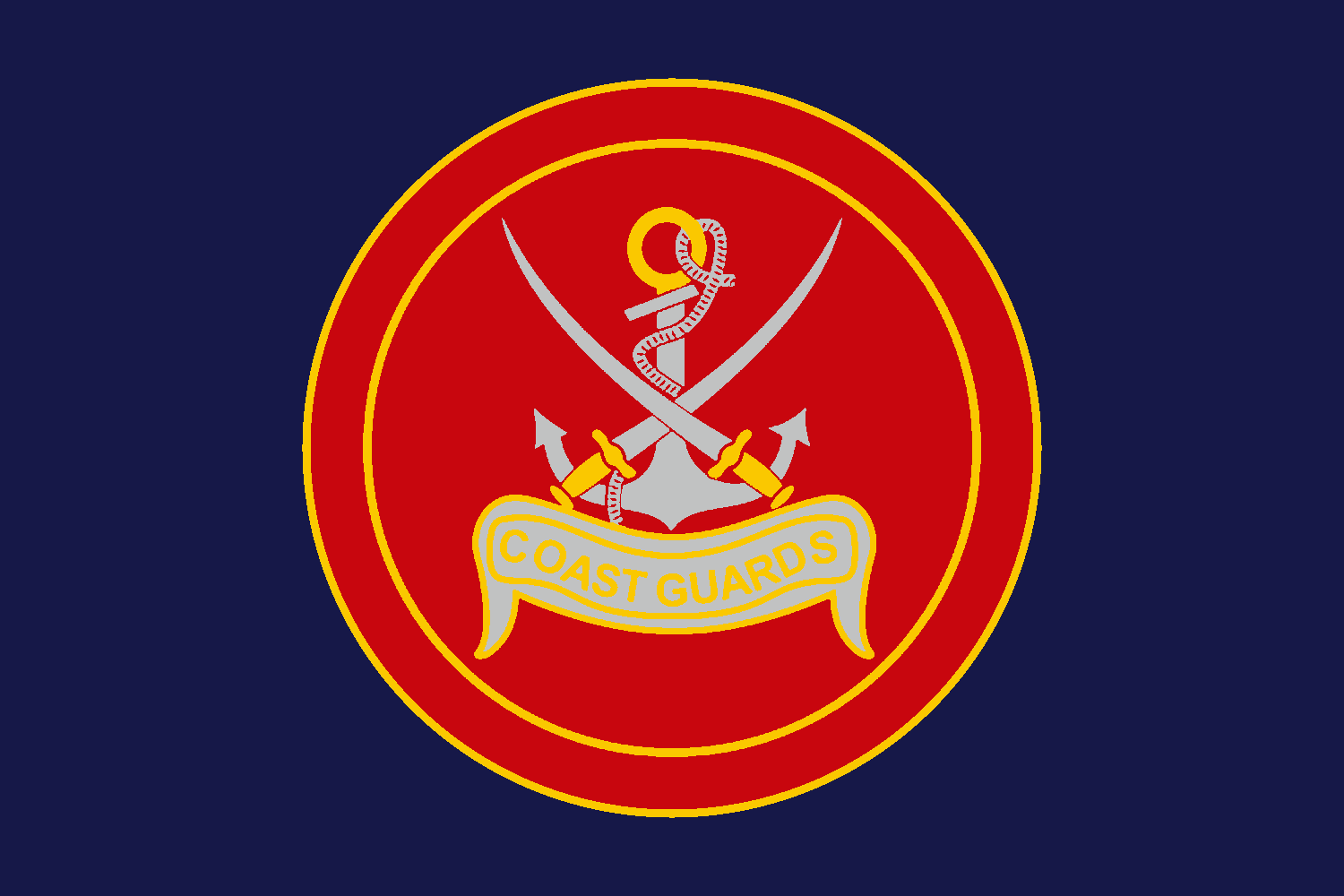
- Flag
- Motto: Defending and Protecting what is Rightfully Ours

Agency overview
- Formed: 1971; 55 years ago
- Employees: 15,000 active-duty personnel (outdated)
- Volunteers: All (except commissioned officers)

Jurisdictional structure
- Federal agency: Pakistan
- Operations jurisdiction: Pakistan
- Governing body: Ministry of Interior
- Constituting instrument: Pakistan Coast Guard Act, 1973
- General nature: Federal law enforcement
- Specialist jurisdictions: Coastal patrol, marine border protection, marine search and rescue; Paramilitary law enforcement, counter insurgency, riot control

Operational structure
- Overseen by: Ministry of Interior
- Headquarters: Saddar, Karachi, Sindh
- Agency executives: Brdg Aamir Fareed Khan, of Coast Guards
- Parent agency: Civil Armed Forces
- Services provided by: Pakistan Army
- Uniformed as: Pakistan Coast Guards

Facilities
- Vessels: 75 patrol boats; 18 Hovercraft
- Helicopters: Bell 206

Notables
- Significant Conflicts: Insurgency in Balochistan Insurgency in Sindh MQM Militancy Red Sea crisis

Website
- www.pakistancoastguards.gov.pk

The Pakistan Coast Guards (abbreviation: PCG) (Urdu: ساحلی محافظان پاکستان) is a maritime law enforcement agency of the Civil Armed Forces of Pakistan. It is managed and controlled by the Pakistani Ministry of Interior and its weapons and commissioned officers are provided by the Pakistan Army and jointly by the Pakistan Navy (Marine Wing PCG), with a mission of riverine operations and coastal operations including conducting anti-narcotics missions, anti-human trafficking, illegal immigration through the coastal areas, and anti-smuggling initiatives. It is also involved in counterinsurgency to a smaller degree due to its federal paramilitary status and law enforcement responsibilities.

The Coast Guards should not be confused with the Pakistan Maritime Security Agency (PMSA), which is a Marine law enforcement agency managed and controlled by the Pakistan Navy. The PMSA conducts search and rescue operations at sea and helps to defend the coastal areas while conducting military operations for maritime law enforcement in national and international waters.

== History ==
From 1947–60s, the Pakistan Customs had the law enforcement responsibility for the defense of land and sea based frontiers of Pakistan with the objective to prevent smuggling of contraband items into and from Pakistan. In 1971, the headquarters of the Coast Guard was established in Karachi with Pakistan Army's Brigadier Sajjad Husain becoming its first director-general.

Its constitutional status was granted through the Parliamentary procedures in 1972 and became a federal law enforcement agency in 1973 while remaining a branch with the Army. The Pakistan Coast Guards are responsible for maintaining the constitutional law at the Pakistan's beaches and patrolling the riverine platforms while the combat sea-based search and rescue missions, enforcement of admiralty law in the international waters, and preventing the armed piracy falls under the responsibility of the Maritime Security Agency (MSA).

Since then, it has upgraded its facilities and fleet to bolster its capabilities of littoral patrolling of the coast line. As per the old structure of the Coast Guard, the Coast Guard was headed by an appointed Army Major General or Senior Brigadier who was formally known as Director General with a Deputy Director General who was either a junior Brigadier or Full Colonel from the Army. The officers of the Force were seconded from the Army for a period of one to three years, while the troops were permanent. Each battalion was led by a Commanding officer who was a Lieutenant Colonel from the Army and his deputy was an OIC who was a Major from the Army.

The exact number of personnel and equipment held with Coast Guards remains classified. Estimates for its individual battalions ranges from 500 to 1,200 personnel per battalion. The Pakistan Coast Guards works under administrative control of Ministry of Interior in peace time whereas it will come under operational control of Pakistan Army in wartime situations.

== Organization ==
=== Higher command ===
The Coast Guard is headed by an appointed Major General from the Army who is formally known as Director General with two sector commanders who are Brigadier from the Army. Each sector commander has a few full Colonels (also from the Army) who help them manage their respective sectors. The officers of the Force are seconded from the Army for a period of one to three years, while the troops are permanent. Each battalion is led by a Commanding officer who is a Lieutenant Colonel from the Army and his deputy is an OIC who is a Major from the Army.

All Commissioned Officers of the Pakistan Coast Guard (from regular Lieutenant onwards till Major-General) come from the Pakistan Army. Despite this they fall under Ministry of Interior rather than the Ministry of Defence, except during wartime.

=== Headquarters and Battalions ===
The Headquarters with its complements and PCG Hospital.

PCG Battalions are led by commandants with the rank of lieutenant colonel, appointment coming from the Army. These battalions are divided into two sectors.

Sector East (headquartered in Korangi, Sindh):

- 5th Battalion, Gharo
- 2nd Battalion, Korangi
- PCG Marine Wing, Karachi

Sector West (headquartered in Gwader, Balochistan):

- 3rd Battalion, Gwadar
- 4th Battalion, Pasni
- 1st Battalion, Windar
- 6th Battalion, Ormara

The PCG's Field Intelligence Unit is based in both sectors.

The battalions are each subdivided into 3-4 companies (commanded by majors, captains, and lieutenants seconded from the Army).

Interior Ministry support:

- Helicopters (Bell 206 Jet Ranger) from 50 Aviation Squadron.

In addition to land based troops, the Coast Guards also maintains a small fleet of patrol boats to perform its sea-borne duties, although the operations in deep water and dangerous undertaking are conducted by its counterpart Maritime Security Agency (MSA) of Pakistan Navy.

=== Marine Wing ===
Pakistan Coast Guards as a whole is spread all over to safeguard coastal belt of 1050 km as well as up to 12 NM Territorial Waters of Pakistan. Marine Wing of PCG is entrusted with the responsibility of 12 NM of territorial waters. The Marine Wing is based at Karachi and commanded by a commander of operation branch, seconded from Pakistan Navy. MW is equipped with Fast Patrol Crafts, lethal Interceptor Boats and other Utility Boats with latest equipment on board. MW has full facility to train its men in the relevant fields and able to conduct general and technical cadres. Marine Wing PCG has also established Search and Rescue Centre to safe the precious life in distress and to prevent property loss or damage.

=== Mounted Infantry Troop ===
AT Coy is based in Korangi with a Training Wing and is responsible for maintaining horses, camels and cattle for use in the field, as well as a dog section. It is commanded by a seconded captain from the Remount, Veterinary and Farm Corps (RV&FC) of the Army. The PCG battalions also have their own fleets of boats and of technicals.

=== Ranks ===
Rank group	General/flag officers		Senior officers			Junior officers
Pakistan Coast Guards
Pakistan Coast Guards	Major general میجر جنرل	Brigadier بریگیڈیئر	Colonel کرنل	Lieutenant colonel لیفٹیننٹ کرنل	Major میجر	Captain کیپٹن	Lieutenant لیفٹنینٹ	Second lieutenant سیکنڈ لیفٹیننٹ

Rank group	Junior commissioned officers			Non commissioned officer	Enlisted
Pakistan Coast Guards							No insignia
Pakistan Coast Guards	Subedar-Major صوبیدار میجر	Subedar صوبیدار	Naib Subedar نائب صوبیدار	Havildar حوالدار۔	Naik نائیک۔	Lance Naik لانس نائیک۔	Sepoy سپاہی۔

== Roles of PCG ==
=== Anti-smuggling ===
To keep a check on smugglers and stop their activities of smuggling (inbound as well as outbound) through the sea routes. PCG Battalions have special check posts all along the coastal belt and also pickets the threatened areas randomly. In addition, The Intelligence Wing has a network of agents and informers and establish pickets in consultation with Commandants of the PCG Battalions when a potential smuggling activity is reported to take place. PCG has been equipped with modern communication and surveillance equipment; including radars, to perform this task.

=== Human Trafficking ===
The Pakistan Coast Guard has in recent years, undertaken greater operations against drug & weapon and even human trafficking/smuggler networks operating in the coastal waters.

=== Counter Narcotics ===
PCG is responsible for narcotics control along Pakistan's coastline.

== Fleet ==
- Fast Defender-class Patrol Boats (FPB)s - including Rigid inflatable boats
- Interceptor Boats (IB)s
- Speed Boats (SB)s
- Light Hovercraft (ACV)
- Undisclosed number of Bell 206 helicopters.

== Director-Generals ==
List of former Director-Generals of PCG
Name	From	To
Brigadier Firzok Attaullah	2004	2007
Brigadier Muhammad Javed Iqbal	2009	2012
Brigadier Sherheryar Khan	2012	2016
Brigadier Ateeq-ur-Rehman	2019	2021
Brigadier Saqib Qamar	Sept 2019	Sept 2021
Major General Amjad Hanif	Sept 2021	August 2022
Brigadier Ghulam Abbas	August 2022	December 2024
Major General Jawad Riaz	December 2024	Sept 2026
Major General Ateeq Rafiq	Sept 2026	Incumbent

== See also ==
- Pakistan Maritime Security Agency
- Law enforcement in Pakistan
