= Syed Ahmed Salman =

Pakistani admiral

- Born: Syed Ahmed Salman
- Alma mater: National Defence University; Pakistan Naval War College
- Military career
- Allegiance: Pakistan
- Branch/Service: Pakistan Navy
- Service years: 1991–present
- Rank: Vice Admiral
- Unit: Naval Headquarters
- Commands: Deputy Chief of the Naval Staff, Administration; Assistant Chief of the Naval Staff, Supply; Director of Procurement (Navy); Director Inventory Control Point, Karachi
- Conflicts: 2001–2002 India–Pakistan standoff; 2016 India-Pakistan military confrontation; 2019 India–Pakistan border skirmishes
- Awards: Hilal-i-Imtiaz (Military); Sitara-e-Imtiaz (Military); Tamgha-e-Imtiaz (Military)

Syed Ahmed Salman is a Vice Admiral and a flag officer in the Pakistan Navy currently serving as the Deputy Chief of the Naval Staff (Supply), DCNS-S at Naval Headquarters in Islamabad. Before this he has also served as DCNS (Administration) where he took the office as Head of Administration branch of Pakistan Navy back in November 2021. Before this he has also served in a type commander post of Director of Procurement, Navy (DP NAVY) in Islamabad.

== Biography ==
Syed Ahmed Salman joined the Pakistan Navy in 1987 and was commissioned into the Supply Branch in 1991.
