= Agha Jan Akhtar =

Pakistani civil servant

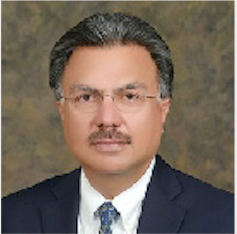

Chairman and Chief Executive Officer of the Port Qasim Authority
- In office 2013–2017
- Preceded by: Najaf Quli Mirza
- Succeeded by: Brigadier (Retd) Saeed Ahmed Khan

Personal details
- Spouse: Rabiya Javeri Agha
- Children: 4 sons
- Education: University of Southern California (BSc, Electrical Engineering); Pepperdine University (MBA, Management)
- Profession: Retired officer of the Pakistan Administrative Service

Agha Jan Akhtar is a retired officer of the Pakistan Administrative Service who served in BPS-21 grade as the Chairman of the Port Qasim Authority under the Ministry of Maritime Affairs from 2013 to 2017. Prior to that, he served as a provincial secretary in the Government of Sindh including as Principal Secretary to Chief Minister Qaim Ali Shah.

He has a bachelor's degree in Electrical Engineering from the University of Southern California and holds a master's in business administration in management from Pepperdine University, California.

Agha Jan Akhtar belongs to the 15th Common and is batchmates with Shoaib Mir Memon, Hussain Asghar, Rizwan Ahmed, Fawad Hasan Fawad and Jawad Rafique Malik.

== Career ==
During his time as Chairman of the Port Qasim Authority (PQA), International Union for Conservation of Nature (IUCN), the PQA and leading private sector companies of Pakistan jointly launched Pakistan's first business and biodiversity platform (BBP) at a ceremony held at PQA headquarters. The platform was a unique initiative focusing on nature conservation through the collective support of the private sector.

== Personal life ==
Agha Jan Akhtar is married to Rabiya Javeri Agha, also a retired PAS officer who had served as Federal Secretary for Human Rights. They are the parents of four sons.
