= Deputy Chief of the Naval Staff (Pakistan) =

- ڈپٹی چیف آف دی نیول اسٹاف
- Flag of the Deputy Chief of the Naval Staff
- Ministry of Defence; Navy Secretariat-III at MoD
- Abbreviation: DCNS
- Seat: Naval Headquarters (NHQ); Islamabad, Pakistan
- Appointer: Chief of the Naval Staff (CNS)
- Formation: 3 March 1972; 54 years ago
- Succession: Subjected to the decision of the Chief of the Naval Staff of the Pakistan Navy.
- Unofficial names: Deputy Naval Chief
- Deputy: Assistant Chief of the Naval Staff (ACNS)
- Salary: According to Pakistan Military officer's Pay Grade(BPS-22,21)
- Website: Official website

The Deputy Chief of the Naval Staff (DCNS) are several very important administrative senior military appointments and principle staff commands, headed and commanded by the Principal Staff Officers (PSOs) at the NHQ. They are also the commander of their respective branch in the Pakistan Navy and these commands are held by senior flag officers of Rear Admiral and Vice Admiral rank in the Navy and are directly reporting and functioning under the Chief of the Naval Staff. DCNS appointments play a very important administrative role for the proper functioning of an entire navy. The DCNS appointments ranges from rear admiral to vice admiral rank depending on assignment nature.

== Naval Headquarters ==
=== Principle Staff Commands and Principle Staff Officers ===
Since its earliest inception, the Pakistan Navy has had a unique command structure. The Navy's functionality is divided in various branches, seven of which are military branches also known as Staff Commands. These Staff Commands fulfill the administrative functions of the Pakistan Navy and are directed by the several appointed Deputy Chief of the Naval Staff (DCNS). The Pakistan Navy's high command operate from NHQ.

Principle Staff Commands	Call Sign	Principal Staff Officers
Deputy Chief of the Naval Staff, Materials	DCNS-M	V/ADM Abid Hameed
Deputy Chief of the Naval Staff, Projects	DCNS-P	R/ADM Shafquat Hussain Akhtar
Deputy Chief of the Naval Staff, Training and Personnel	DCNS-T&P	V/ADM Muhammad Saleem
Deputy Chief of the Naval Staff, Operations	DCNS-O	V/ADM Raja Rab Nawaz
Deputy Chief of the Naval Staff, Supply	DCNS-S	R/ADM Syed Ahmed Salman
Deputy Chief of the Naval Staff, Administration	DCNS-A	R/ADM Syed Ahmed Salman
Deputy Chief of the Naval Staff, Welfare and Housing	DCNS-W&H	R/ADM Shifaat Ali Khan

== See also ==
- Chief of the Naval Staff
- Vice Chief of the Naval Staff
- Deputy Chief of the Air Staff
- Deputy Chief of the Army Staff
