= Commander Central Punjab =

- Country: Pakistan
- Branch: Pakistan Navy
- Commanding Headquarter: PNS PUNJAB
- Nickname: COMCEP
- Engagements: 2008 Indo-Pakistani standoff
- Website: https://www.paknavy.gov.pk/comcep.html

Commanders
- Commander Central Punjab (COMCEP): R/ADM Sohail Ahmed Azmie HI(M)

Commander Central Punjab (abbreviated COMCEP), is a military formation of the Pakistan Navy in the Northern Pakistan, covering the area of responsibility (AOR) of defending the Punjab Province. It is headquartered in PNS PUNJAB in Lahore, Punjab Province of Pakistan. The command is usually held by a senior flag officer of Rear Admiral rank. Commander Central Punjab reports to the Vice Chief of the Naval Staff of its respected command.

The COMCEP is mandated to "ensure excellence in training and provide conducive and secure working environment for units in AoR through efficient logistic and admin support system along with looking after PN interest in AoR." Its units include the Pakistan Navy War College and PNS PUNJAB.

== Government links ==
- Commander Central Punjab
