= PMSS Kashmir =

Multi-purpose vessel of the Pakistan Maritime Security Agency

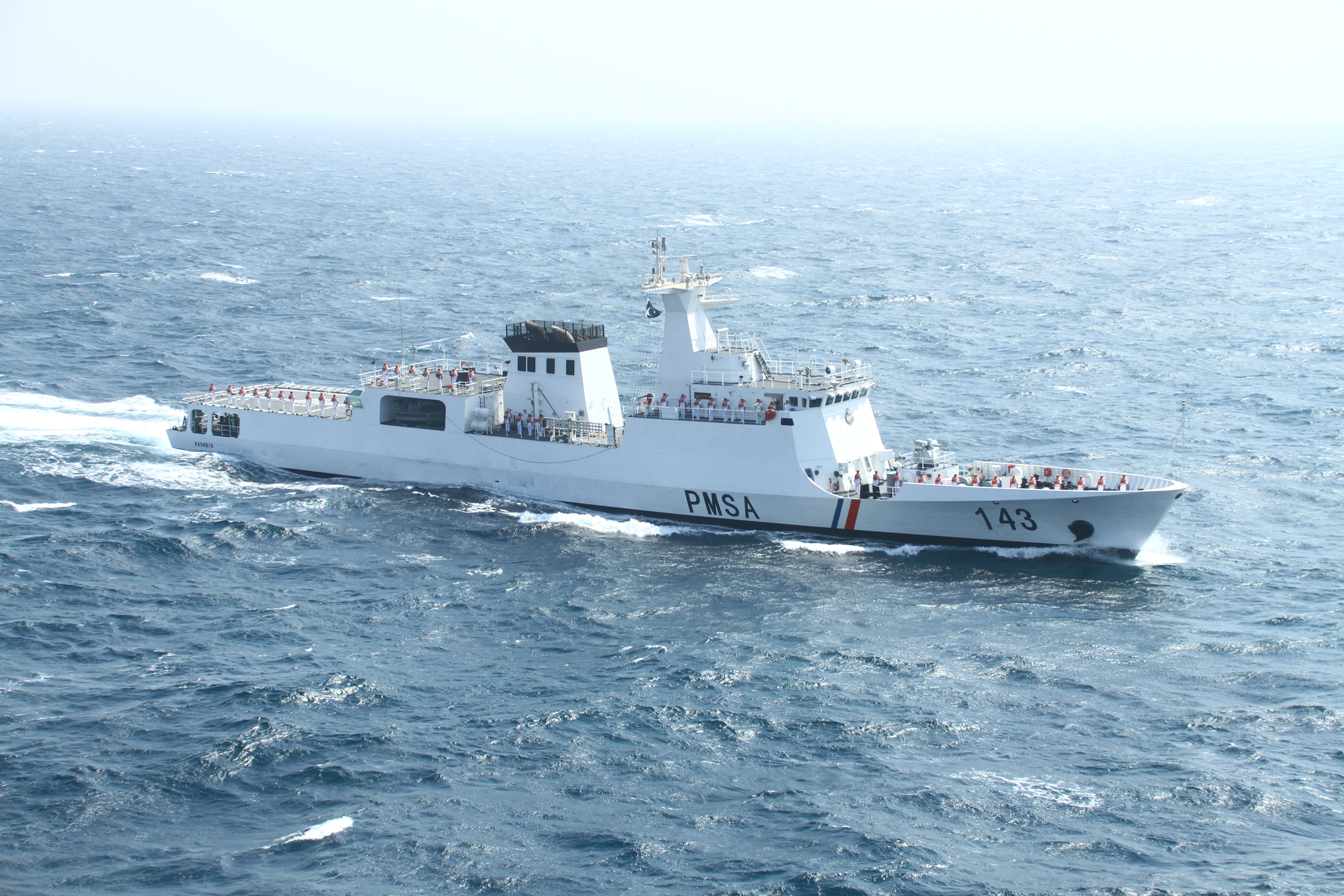
- PMSS Kashmir underway on 12 February 2019

History

Pakistan
- Name: Kashmir
- Namesake: Kashmir
- Owner: Pakistan Maritime Security Agency
- Builder: Huangpu Wenchong Shipyard, China CSSC
- Laid down: 16 August 2016
- Launched: 7 September 2017
- Commissioned: 20 July 2018
- Home port: Port of Karachi
- Identification: Pennant number: P-143
- Status: Active

General characteristics
- Class & type: Kashmir-class multi-purpose vessel
- Displacement: 1,550 tons
- Length: 94 m (308 ft 5 in)
- Beam: 12 m (39 ft 4 in)
- Propulsion: 2 × MAN diesel engines
- Speed: 26 knots (48 km/h; 30 mph)
- Range: 3,500 nmi (6,500 km; 4,000 mi) at 26 knots (48 km/h; 30 mph)
- Sensors & processing systems: TRANSAS; JMA-5312 radar
- Armament: 1 × 30 mm naval gun; 2 × 12.7 mm guns
- Aircraft carried: 1 × helicopter
- Aviation facilities: Flight deck and hangar

PMSS Kashmir is the lead ship of the Kashmir class of multipurpose vessels (MPVs) that was commissioned on 20 July 2018 at Haungpu Shipyard, Guangzhou, China and was launched and formally inducted into Pakistan Maritime Security Agency Fleet as part of OSRON-22 Squadron on 7 September 2018.

== Background ==
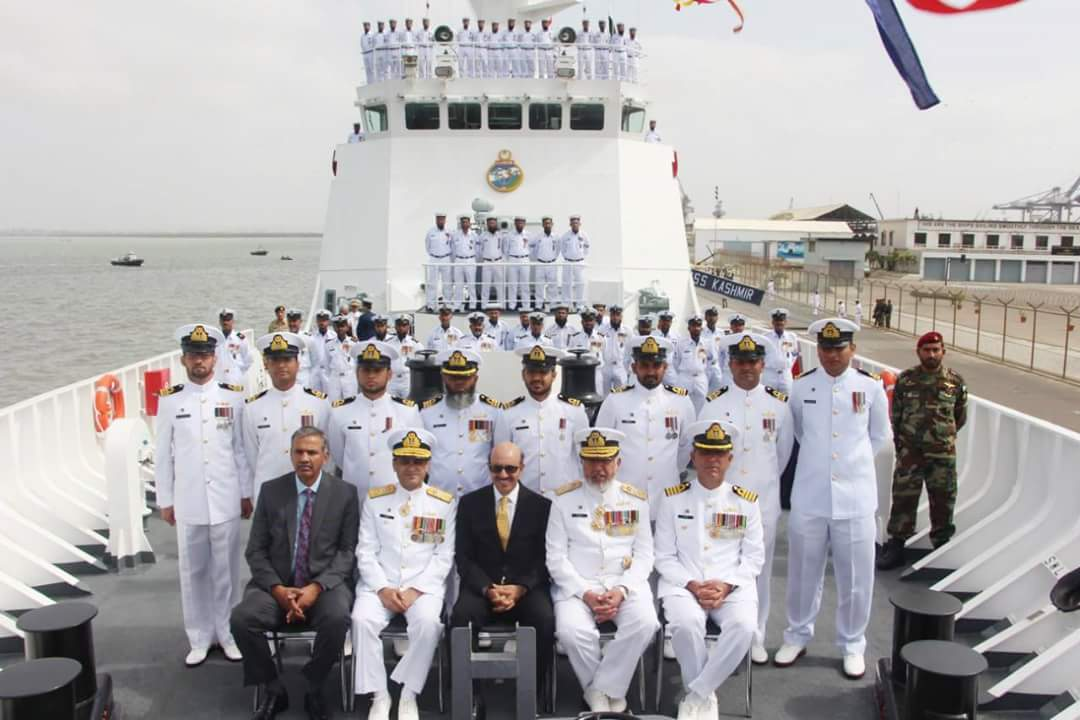
Induction ceremony of PMSS Kashmir on 7 September 2018

Kashmir was designed by China State Shipbuilding Corporation (CSSC)'s marine engineering subsidiary 708 Research Institute. It was built by Huangpu Wenchong Shipbuilding in the Chinese city of Guangzhou. It is a variant of the Pattani-class offshore patrol vessel in service with the Royal Thai Navy, and the P18N in service with the Nigerian Navy.

The second ship of the Kashmir-class MPV, PMSS Kolachi was built locally by Karachi Shipyard and Engineering Works (KS&EW) with assistance from CSSC as part of a technology transfer agreement. It is one of six PMSA patrol vessels to be built under the agreement. The five other ships include Kolachi's near identical sister and the four smaller 600-tonne vessels of the Hingol class.

PMSS Kashmir is capable of undertaking multifarious missions such as surveillance, policing, anti-smuggling and anti-poaching operations, security and law-enforcement patrolling in maritime zones, pollution monitoring and control and search and rescue operations while operating independently or as part of a task force in a multi-threat environment for extended duration at sea due to having that capability of replenishment and shipboard helicopter operations.

== Service history ==
In May 2026, PMSS Kashmir was involved in rescue operations involving the Indian offshore tug and supply vessel Gautam in the Arabian Sea. Humanitarian assistance was provided to the crew of the vessel, which included six Indians and one Indonesian.
