= Tamgha-e-Basalat =

Award of the Pakistan Armed Forces

Tamgha-e-Basalat تمغہِ بسالت
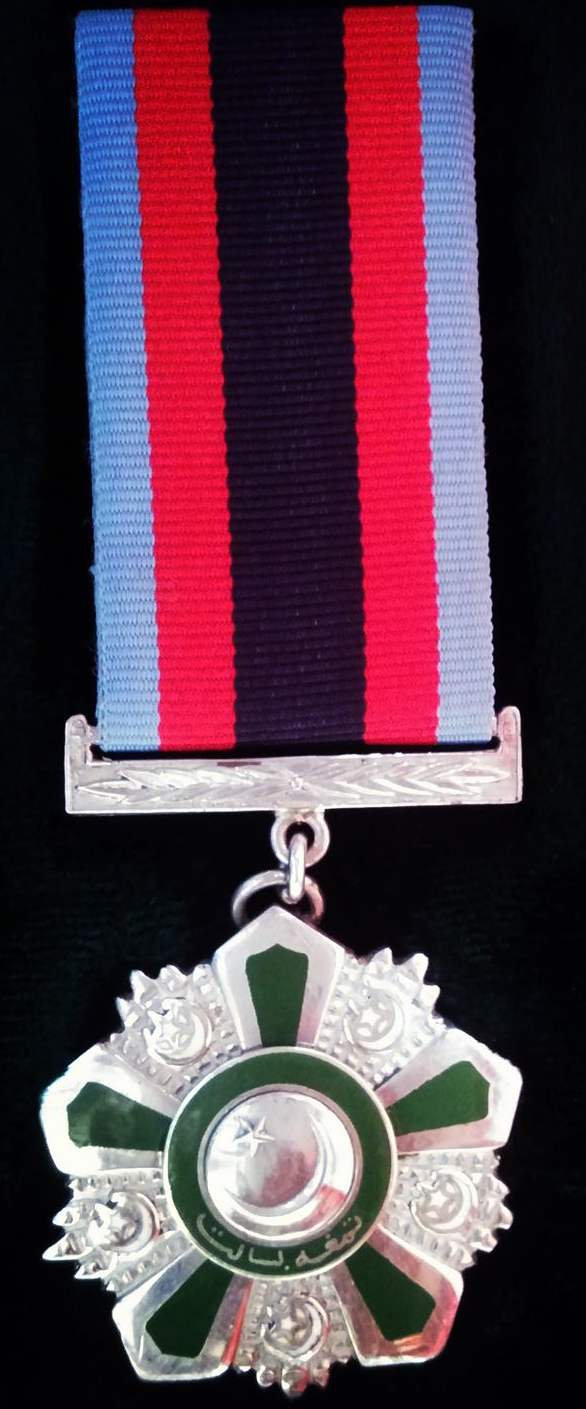
- Obverse of Tamgha-i-Basalat Medal
- Type: Operational Gallantry Award
- Awarded for: "... acts of valour, courage & devotion"
- Presented by: Government of Pakistan
- Post-nominals: TBt
- Status: Currently Awarded
- Established: On 16 March 1957 by the President of Pakistan
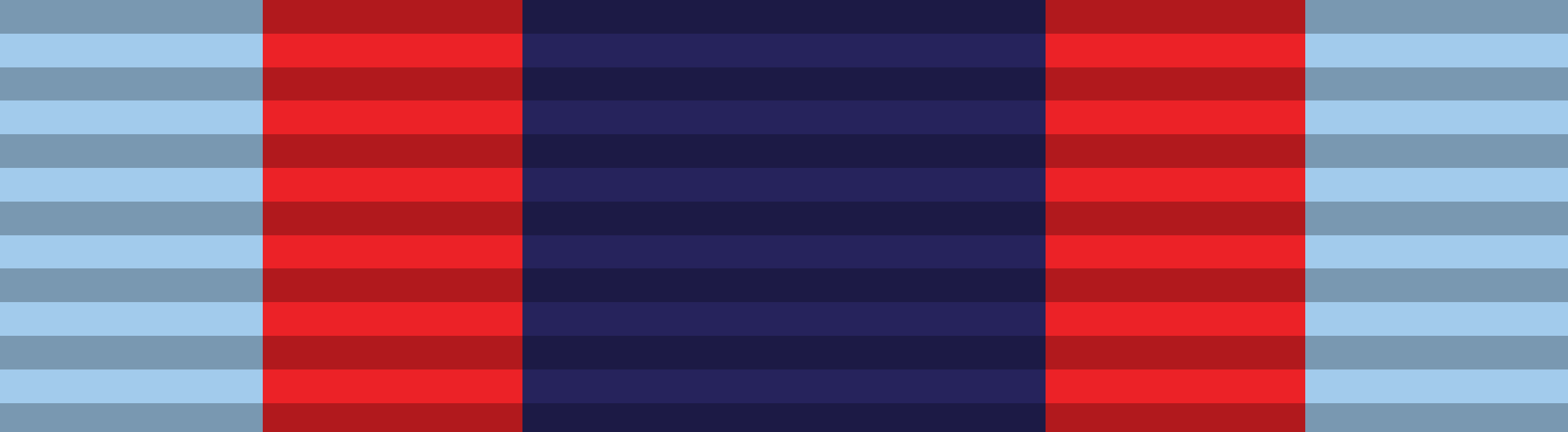
- Ribbon Bar of Tamgha-e-Basalat

Precedence
- Next (higher): Sitara-e-Basalat

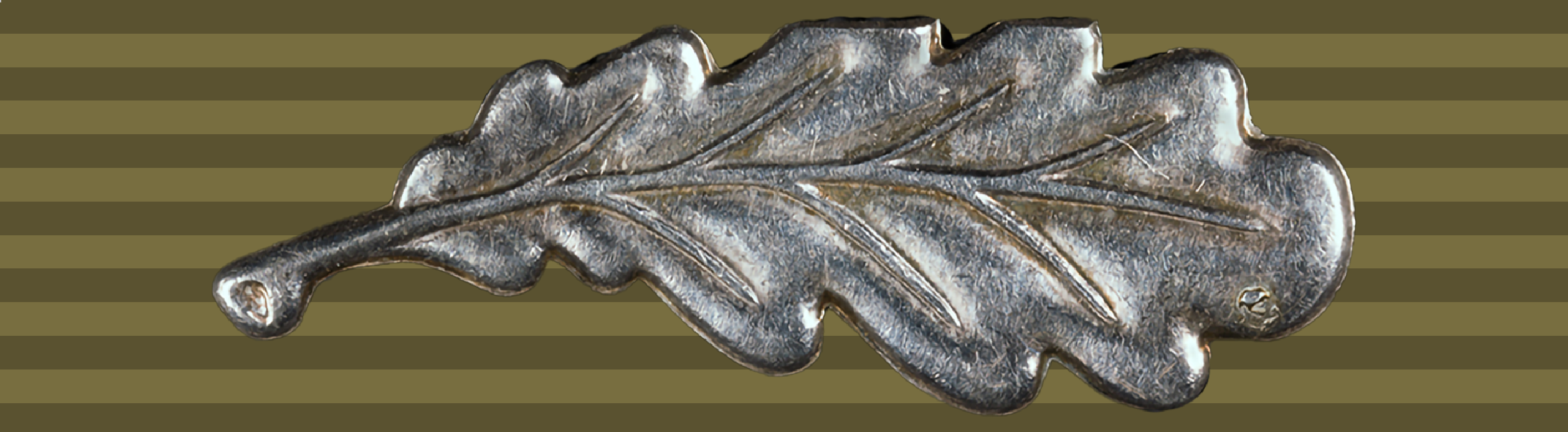
- Next (lower): Imtiazi Sanad

Tamgha-e-Basalat (Urdu: تمغہِ بسالت, lit. 'Medal of Valour') is an award of the Pakistan Armed Forces.

== See also ==
- Awards and decorations of the Pakistan Armed Forces
