= Pakistan Navy War College =

Staff college for the Pakistan Navy at Walton, Punjab

- Former name: Navy Staff School
- Type: Military staff college
- Established: 1968; 58 years ago
- Affiliations: National Defence University
- Commandant: R-Adm. Sohail Azmie
- Location: Walton Cantt in Lahore, Punjab, Pakistan; 31.49010°N 74.34726°E
- Colors: Blue, White
- Nickname: PNWC
- Website: https://pnwc.paknavy.gov.pk

The Pakistan Navy War College is a military staff college located in Walton Cantonment in Lahore, Punjab, Pakistan. The Navy War College takes pride itself as being the "center of excellence" as it educates and develops leaders in maritime matters, defining the scope of the future navy, roles and missions, supports combat readiness on maritime dimensions, and strengthens global maritime partnerships.

The Navy War College is one of the senior service colleges including the Army's Command and Staff College and the PAF's Air War College. Additionally, the Pakistan's Ministry of Defense operates the Armed Forces War College at the National Defence University (NDU).

== History ==
In 1968, the Navy HQ established the military staff college, which was roughly based on the army's Command & Staff College in Quetta, Balochistan.It was then known as Pakistan Navy Staff School and started its limited instructions on maritime-focused war studies, defense studies, and national security studies at the PNS Himalaya in Manora Island off the coast of Karachi, Sindh, Pakistan. Course curriculums, college ethics, and faculty instructions mirrored from the United States Naval War College.

The school was shifted to PNS Karsaz, Karachi, in 1970 and the efforts to upgrade the school to the level of Staff College commenced soon after. With the commencement of first PN Staff Course (PNSC) on 6 May 1971, it was formally inaugurated as PN Staff College in a make shift building. Since then, the College has been conducting Staff Courses on regular basis. After the Staff School was upgraded to a College in 1971, it retained its original name Naval War College since then.

In 1995, the Naval War College built its own premises and campus when it was shifted permanently in Walton in Lahore as its scope of studies, mission, and enrollment increased to meet the international standards. A state of the art building equipped with latest technology was envisaged thus, site for the new campus was selected at Walton and the construction work commenced in 2012. The Naval War College's campus was inaugurated in August 1996 when the Navy's 25th Staff Course passing out ceremony was held. In 2014, the Naval War College's campus was further expanded at the Walton Cantonment. New campus buildings and dormitories were inaugurated by the Prime Minister of Pakistan on 17 October 2014 when the 44th Staff Course passing out ceremony was held. The 44th PN Staff Course commenced in new purpose-built campus of PN War College.

== College Emblem ==
The Navy War College's emblem was designed by Ismail Gulgee, an internationally renowned Pakistani artist. He selected a verse from the Quran (Surah Al-Alaq, Verse 5) and opted for a calligraphic motif.

The verse reads, "He (Allah) taught man that which he knew not". The verse was repeated four times in the emblem and crafted in a circular arrangement. In 1996, the emblem was redesigned by inserting insignia of Pakistan Navy in the middle. In 2012, it was again redesigned by adding a crescent and a star at the top and inscribing abbreviated title PNWC (Pakistan Navy War College). The Quranic Verse engraved on circular ribbon on the border of the emblem was also emblazoned at the bottom. The insignia of Pakistan Navy was replaced with impression of magnetic compass.

== Academics ==
The Navy War College is a post-graduate military staff college where predominantly naval officers are given admission. However, there are reserved seats are allotted for the army and air force officers. The Navy War College also admits international students from various allied countries especially those with maritime borders as the courses in Nay War College are quite demanding.

Instructions on the topic of interests of national security, human, defense, critical security, peace and conflict, war, and strategic studies, international relations theory, international security, military history and arts, are part of the Navy War College's curriculum.

== Graduation ceremony ==
Upon graduation in their respected plans of degree requirements, the students are awarded and pinned with "PNS" symbol by the Navy War College dean.

The Navy War College's graduation ceremonies are often addressed by the Chief of Naval Staff and the Chief of Army Staff.
