= Rear admiral (Pakistan) =

Third-highest rank in Pakistan navy

Rear Admiral
- Flag of Rear Admiral, Pakistan Navy

- The shoulder stars, shoulder boards, and sleeve stripes of a Pakistani Navy rear admiral of the "line".

- The star insignia of a Pakistani Navy rear admiral
- Country: Pakistan
- Service branch: Pakistan Navy; Pakistan Marines; Inter-Services Public Relations
- Abbreviation: RADM
- Rank: Two-star
- NATO rank code: OF-7
- Non-NATO rank: O-8
- Next higher rank: Vice Admiral
- Next lower rank: Commodore
- Equivalent ranks: Major general (Pakistan Army); Air vice marshal (Pakistan Air Force)

Rear Admiral (abbreviated as RADM) is a two-star commissioned armed senior flag officer rank in the Pakistan Navy, and marines awarded by the Government of Pakistan to Commodores as a position advancement in uniformed service. It is the third-highest rank in Pakistan armed services with a NATO code of OF-7, and while it is worn on epaulettes with a two-star insignia, it ranks above one-star rank Commodore and below three-star rank Vice admiral. Rear Admiral is equivalent to the rank of Major General of the Pakistan Army and Air Vice Marshal of the Pakistan Air Force.

Rear Admiral in the Pakistan Navy is a senior flag officer rank abbreviated as R/ADMPN to distinguish it from the same ranks offered in other countries, although there is no official abbreviation available for a Pakistani rear admiral. Rear Admiral may also be called a two-star Admiral to distinguish it from other insignias such as three-star Vice Admiral and four-star Admiral.

== Appointment and promotion ==
Awarded by the Government of Pakistan to Commodores as a position advancement in uniformed service.

== Statutory limits ==
Since it is the third-highest rank in the Pakistan armed forces with a high classification scale of Grade 21 coupled with additional powers and benefits, the law of Pakistan restricts the use of unsanctioned power by a two-star Admiral and can be constrained under a certain constitutional amendment.

== Gallery ==
Insignia of a two-star Marshal, Air vice marshal

Insignia of two-star Major general Pakistan

The discontinued shoulder and sleeve insignia of a Pakistani Air Vice Marshal
