= Khan Hasham bin Saddique =

Pakistani naval officer, diplomat

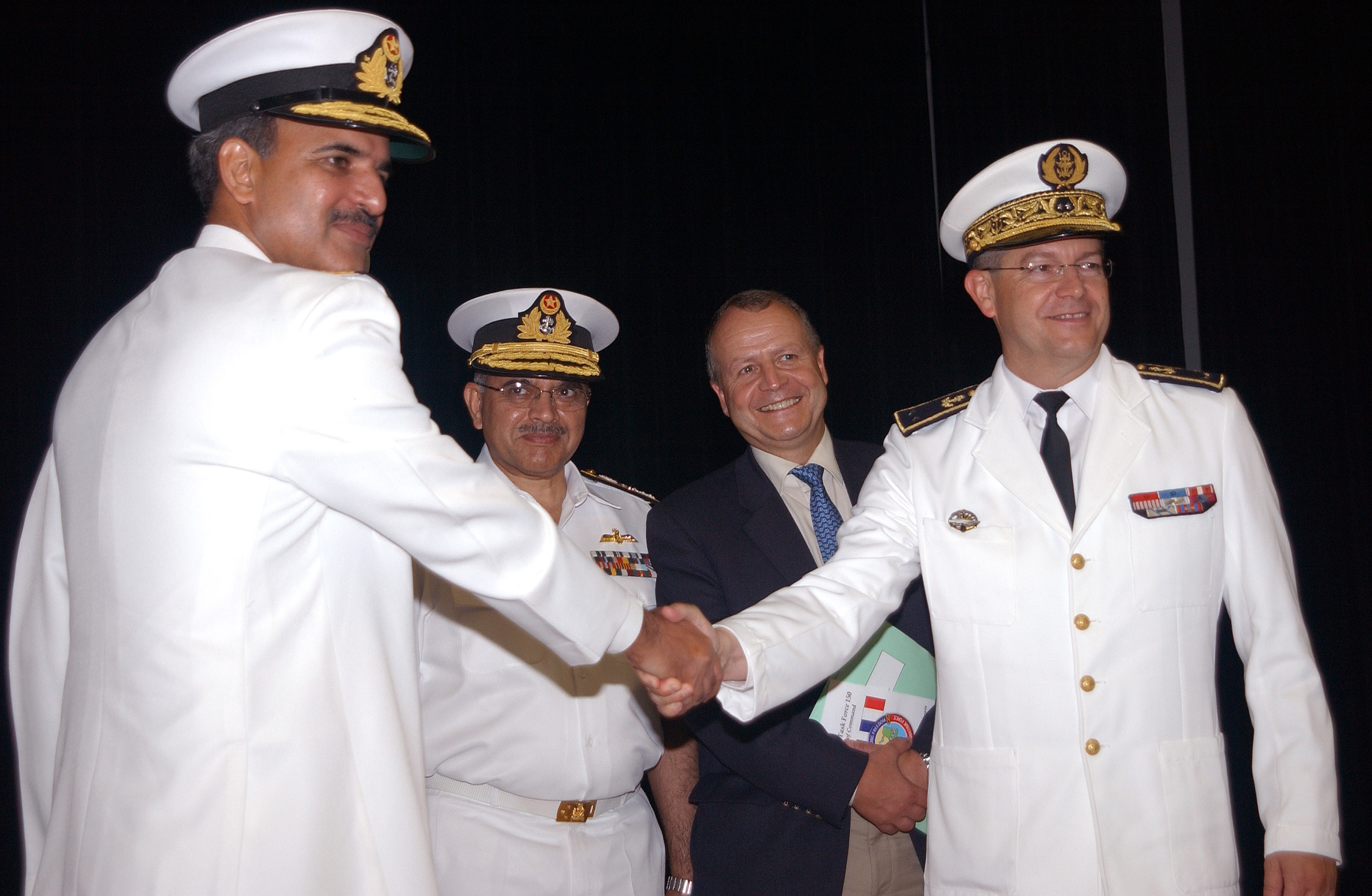
- K.H. Saddique (left).

Pakistan Ambassador to Saudi Arabia
- Incumbent
- Assumed office 5 June 2017
- Preceded by: Manzoor-ul Haq Khan

Personal details
- Born: Khan Hasham bin Saddique; April 1, 1960 (age 66) Karachi, Sindh, Pakistan

Military service
- Allegiance: Pakistan
- Branch/service: Pakistan Navy
- Years of service: 1977–2017
- Rank: Vice Admiral
- Unit: Naval Operations Branch
- Commands: Vice Chief of Naval Staff (VCNS); Commander Pakistan Fleet; Combined Task Force 150; Cmdnt Naval War College; Cmdnt Naval Academy
- Battles/wars: 2001–02 India–Pakistan standoff War in North-West Pakistan; Piracy off the coast of Somalia; 2016 India–Pakistan military confrontation
- Awards: Hilal-i-Imtiaz (military); Sitara-i-Imtiaz (military); Sword of Honour

Khan Hasham bin Saddique (Urdu:خان حشام بن صديق) is a retired vice admiral of the Pakistan Navy and a former diplomat who served as the Pakistan Ambassador to Saudi Arabia.

== Biography ==
Saddique was born in Karachi, Sindh, Pakistan on 1 April 1960. He was initially schooled and educated at the PAF Public School in Sargodha, Punjab, Pakistan, before attending the Cadet College Petaro. He graduated from the Cadet College Petaro in Jamshoro, Sindh in Pakistan, before joining the Navy in 1977. He went to the United Kingdom and joined the Britannia Royal Naval College where he did his military training and returned to the Pakistan Naval Academy where he secured his graduation in communication with distinction after being conferred with the Sword of Honour as best All Round graduates.

After returning to Pakistan 1980, he gained commission as Lieutenant in the Navy in the Naval Operations Branch. Lt. Saddique served as an Executive officer in the PNS Badr D(161), and later elevated as Squadron Operations Officer in the 25th Destroyer Squadron.

He attended the National Defence University where he attained his MSc in Joint warfare, M.Phil in National Security, and later attained his MS in War Studies from the Quaid-i-Azam University, also in Islamabad. Saddique is a graduate of the Naval Postgraduate School in Monterey, California, United States where he graduated with an M.Sc. in Operations Research.

=== War and command appointments in Pakistan Navy ===
During his career in the Navy, he enjoyed a distinguished career, having attained the vast experience of both command and staff appointments. As Commander, he assumed the command of the Shah Jahan in 2001–02, and ACNS (Plans) at the Navy NHQ as Captain. Commodore Saddique's one-star assignments included his role as Commandant of Naval Academy, Naval War College, and the National Security College at the National Defence University in Islamabad. At the Navy NHQ, Cdre. Saddique also served as the DCNS (Admin) and DCNS (Ops).

Cdre Saddique came to public attention he took over the command of the Combined Task Force 150 at the NAVCENT HQ in Bahrain as his command assignment, which was vital in combating the Maritime Security and Counterterrorism in 2007. In 2008, Cdre. Saddique relieved the command to French Navy.

In 2009, Cdre Saddique was promoted to the two-star rank in the Navy. After leaving the CTF-15 in 2010, Rear-Admiral Saddique went to serve as the DCNS (Admin) and DCNS (Ops) at the Navy NHQ.

In 2013, Rear-Admiral Saddique assumed the command of the navy's fleet as its Commander Pakistan Fleet (COMPAK), becoming responsible for the entire fleet as a fleet commander. Rear-Admiral Saddique remained in this key assignment until 2014 when he assumed the post as DCNS (Projects) with three-star rank promotion; he left the post to Rear-Admiral Zafar Abbasi.

In 2014, Vice-Admiral Saddique was in the race to be appointed as a four-star admiral and take over the command of the Navy as its Chief of Naval Staff, alongside Vice-Admiral Zafar Abbasi and Vice-Admiral S. A. Hussaini. However, the most senior admiral in the Navy, Admiral Moh'd Zakaullah was promoted to the four-star appointment, and Vice-Admiral Saddique was appointed as vice-chief of naval staff.

As vice chief of naval staff, he played a crucial role in stressing the role of the Pakistan Marines as an effective force, eventually supporting his role in establishing the marine bases in the country.

=== Pakistan Ambassador to Saudi Arabia ===
On April 2, 2017, the Foreign Ministry announced to appoint Vice-Admiral Saddique as an ambassador to Saudi Arabia once his retirement was confirmed. He was noted as being the third admiral in the Navy to be appointed as envoy to Saudi Arabia, others being Admiral Abdul Aziz Mirza who head the diplomatic assignment from 2002–05, followed by Admiral Shahid Karimullah from 2005–09.

He did not seek extension but left his command assignment earlier to be appointed as his country's top diplomat in Saudi Arabia on 2 April 2017. Before arriving to Saudi Arabia, Vice-Admiral Saddique held meeting with then-Interior Minister Nisar Ali Khan.

On 5 June 2017, Vice-Admiral Saddique presented his diplomatic credentials to Yousef Al-Othaimeen, the Secretary General of the Organisation of Islamic Cooperation, and took up his diplomatic assignment in Riyadh.

== See also ==
- Arab community in Pakistan
- Pakistan–Saudi Arabia relations
