= Amjad Khan Niazi =

17th Naval Chief of Pakistan

Admiral Amjad Khan Niazi NI(M) HI(M) SI(M) SBt OM
- امجد خان نیازی
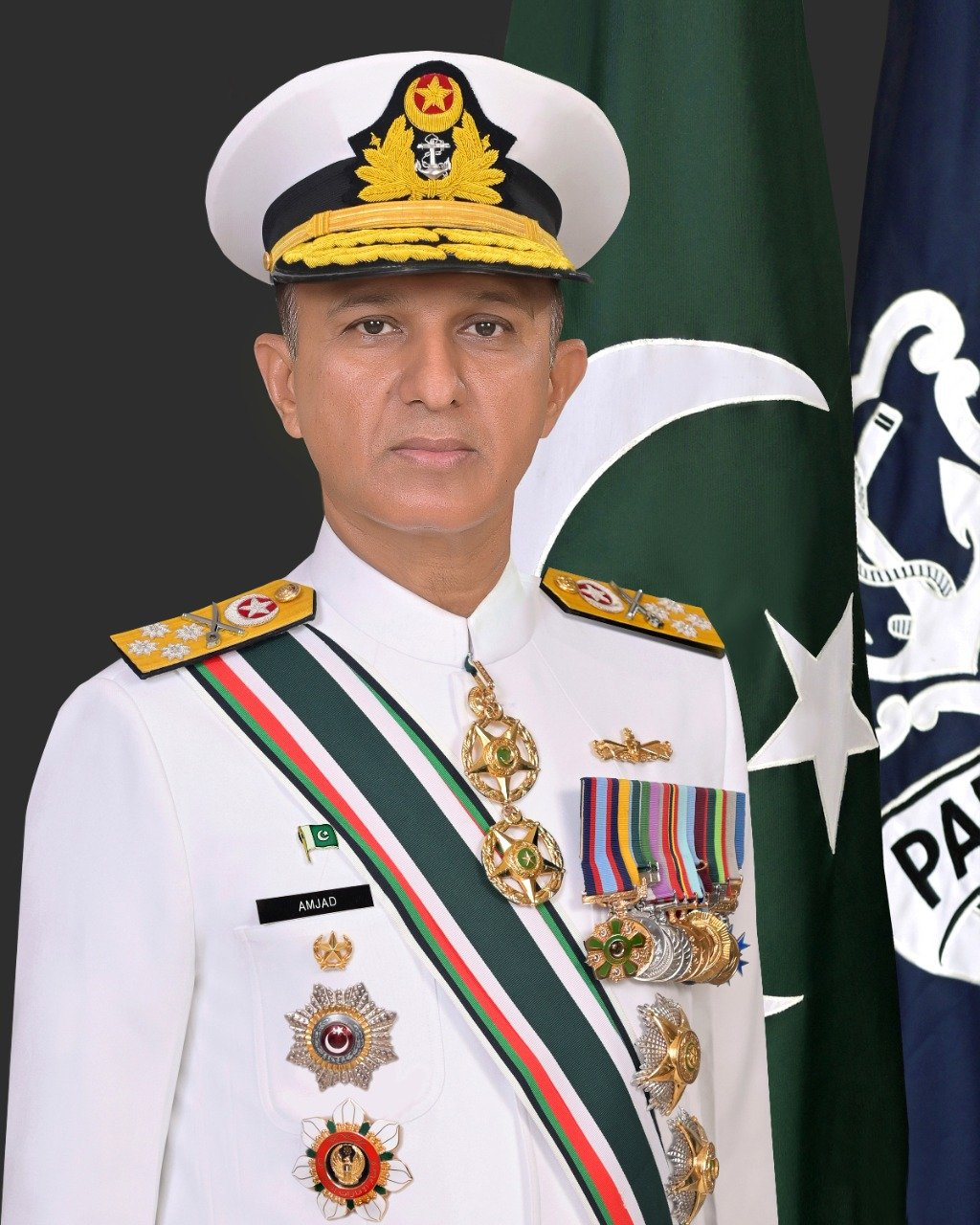
- Admiral Niazi

17th Chief of Naval Staff
- In office 7 October 2020 – 7 October 2023
- President: Arif-ur-Rehman Alvi
- Prime Minister: Imran Khan; Shahbaz Sharif; Anwar ul Haq Kakar
- Preceded by: Zafar Mahmood Abbasi
- Succeeded by: Naveed Ashraf

Personal details
- Born: Sanghar, Pakistan
- Education: National Defence University

Military service
- Allegiance: Pakistan
- Branch/service: Pakistan Navy
- Years of service: 1982–2023
- Rank: Admiral
- Unit: CNS
- Commands: Chief of Staff (Operations); Deputy Chief of the Naval Staff (Training & Evaluation); Commander, Pakistan Fleet; Commander Karachi; Naval Intelligence; Commander Central Punjab; Principal Secretary Chief of Naval Staff; Commandant Naval War College
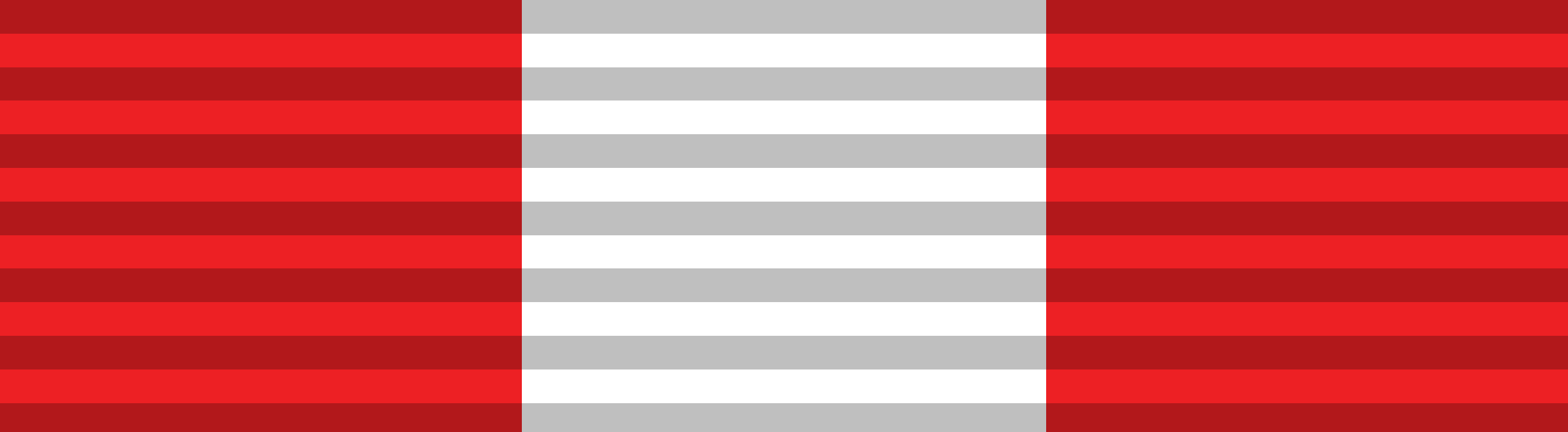
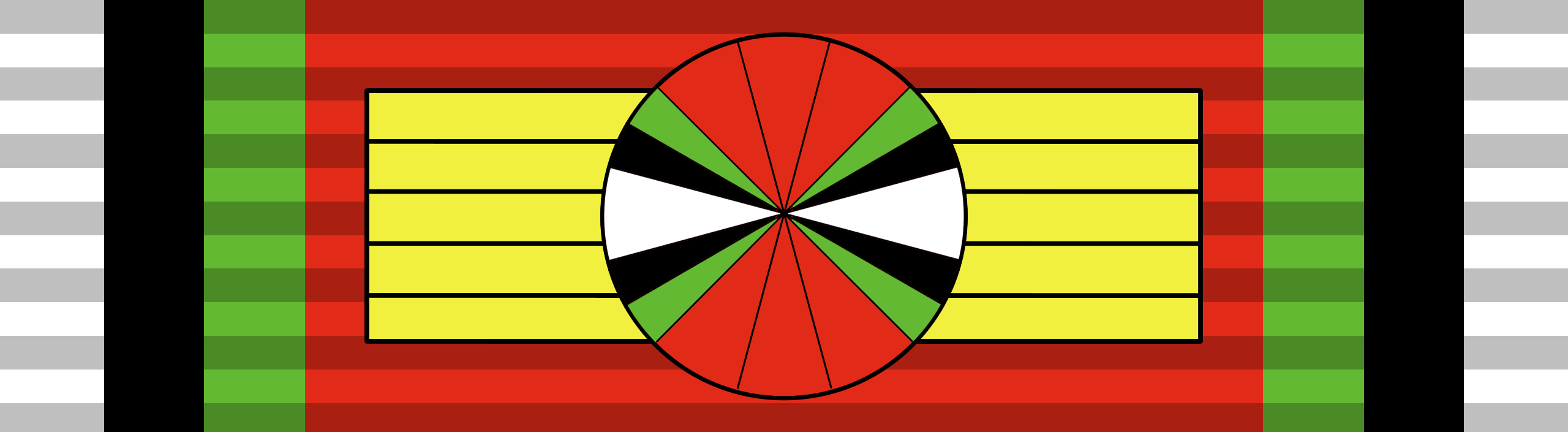
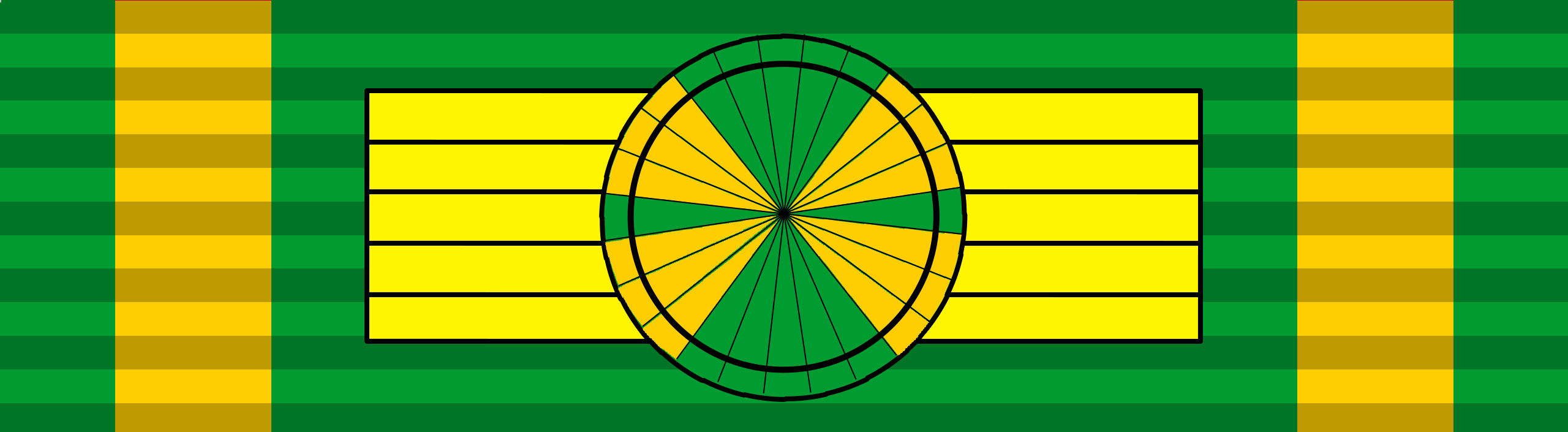
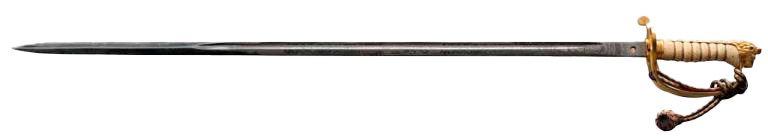
- Awards: Nishan-e-Imtiaz (Military) Hilal-e-Imtiaz (Military) Sitara-e-Imtiaz (Military) Sitara-e-Basalat National Order of Merit Turkish Legion of Merit Military Merit Order Order of AbdulAziz Order of Military Service Sword of Honour

Amjad Khan Niazi NI(M) HI(M) SI(M) SBt OM (Urdu: محمد امجد خان نیازی) is a retired four-star admiral of the Pakistan Navy who served as the 22nd Chief of Naval Staff of Pakistan from 2020 to 2023. He previously served as principal secretary to Chief of the Naval Staff and director-general Naval Intelligence, in addition to commanding 2 Zulfiquar-class frigate.

== Early life and career ==
Niazi was born into a Pashtun family of the Niazi tribe in Sanghar, Sindh, Pakistan. He was commissioned in Operations Branch of Pakistan Navy in 1985 and also won the coveted Sword of Honour upon completion of initial training at Pakistan Naval Academy in Karachi. After Admiral Muhammad Zakaullah and Admiral Zafar Mahmood Abbasi Niazi is the third naval chief in the history of Pakistan who is holder of prestigious Sword of Honour.

His command appointments included Commander, Pakistan Fleet, Commanding Officer of PNS Badr and PNS Tariq, 18th Destroyer Squadron Commander, Commandant PNS Bahadur and Commandant Pakistan Navy War College/ Commander Central Punjab, Lahore.

== Chief of Naval Staff ==
On October 7, 2020, President Arif Alvi appointed Niazi the Chief of Naval Staff of Pakistan.

== Awards and decorations ==

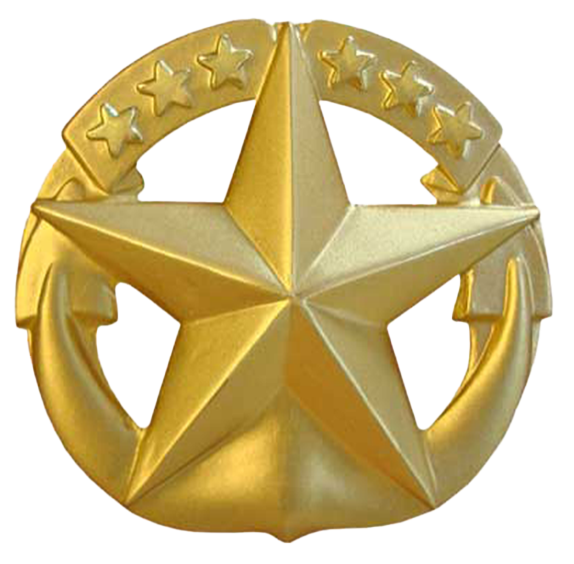

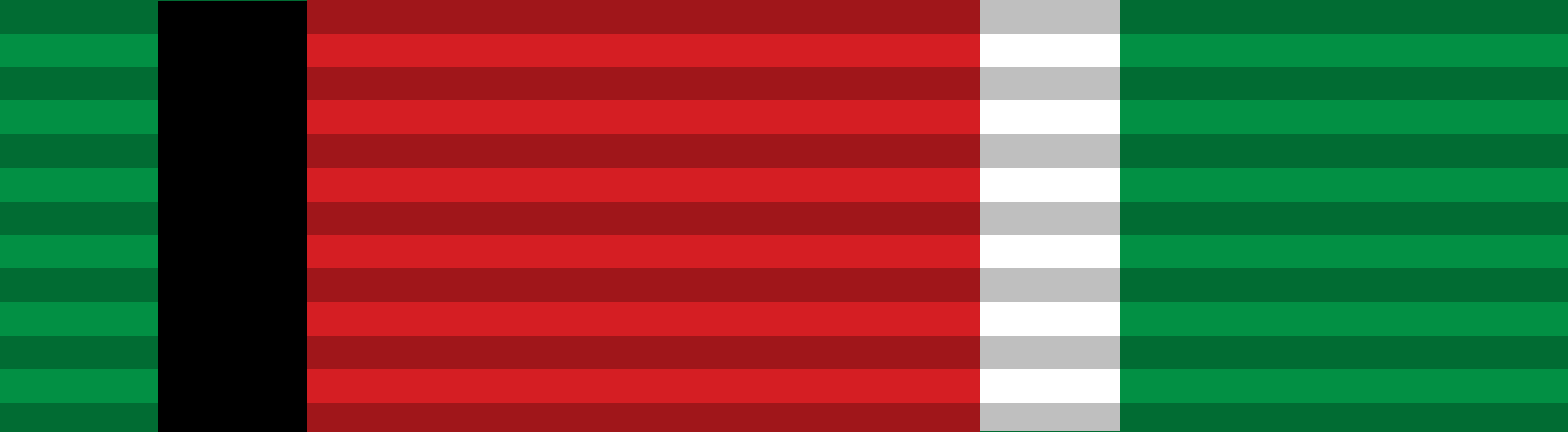

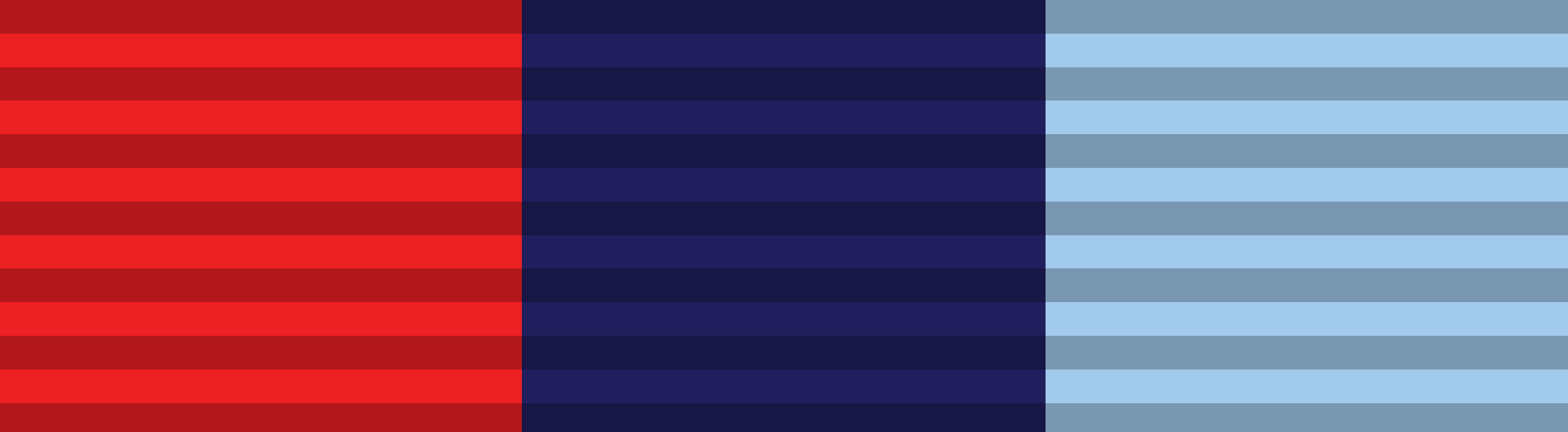

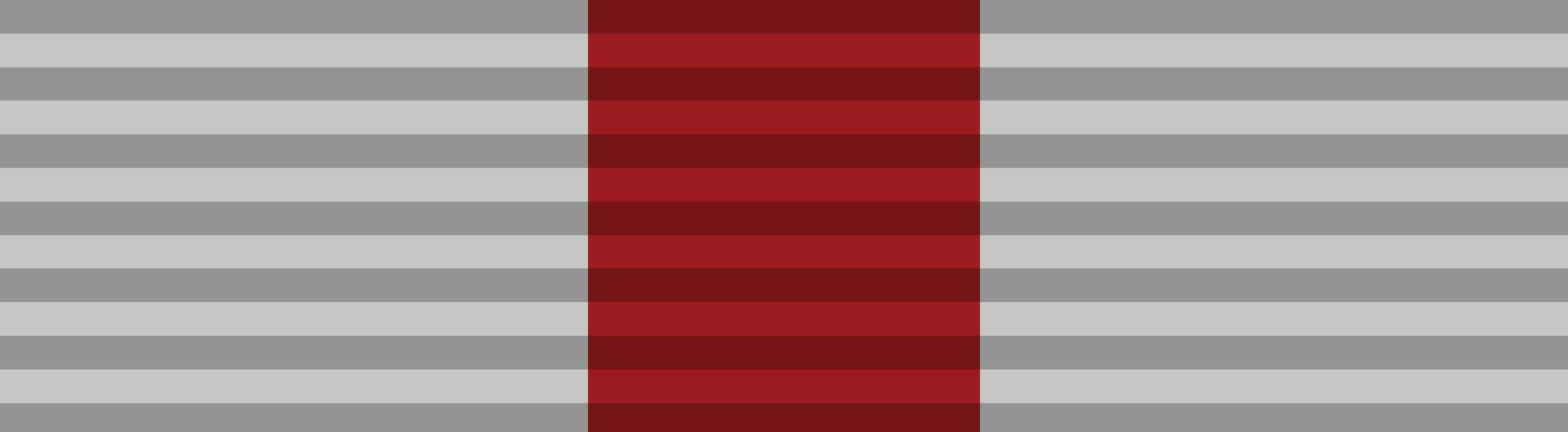

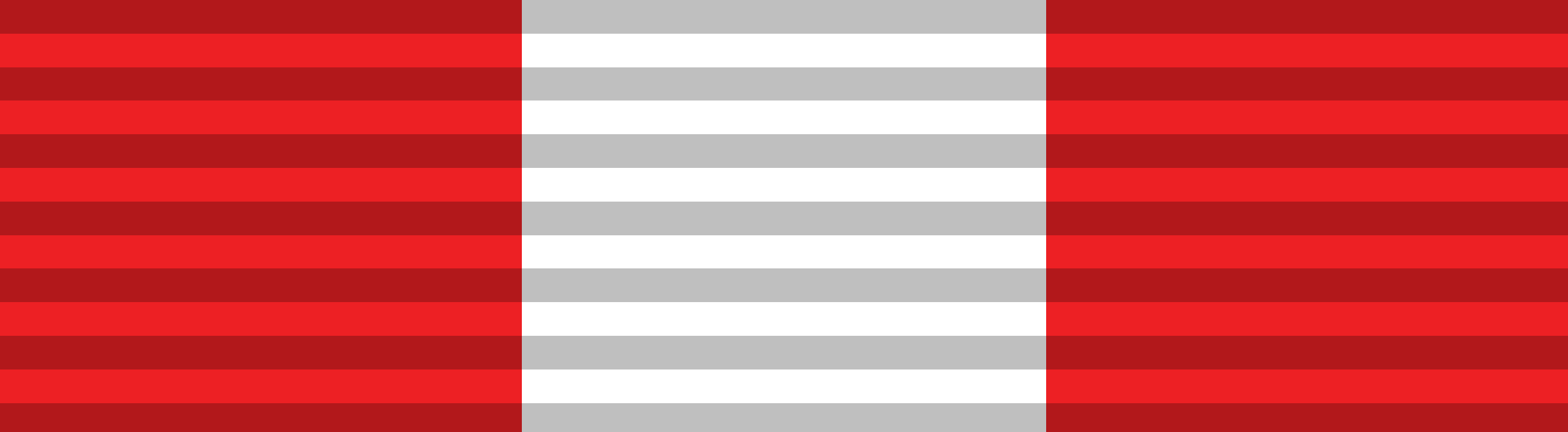

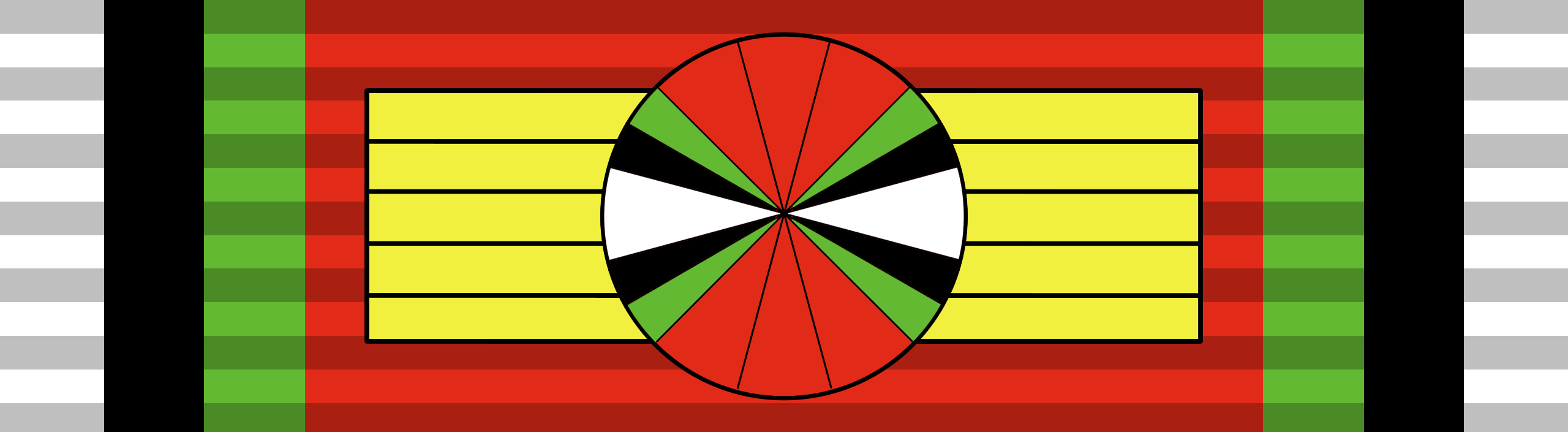

Pakistan Navy Operations Branch Badge
Command at Sea insignia
Nishan-e-Imtiaz (Military) (Order of Excellence)	Hilal-e-Imtiaz (Military) (Crescent of Excellence)		Sitara-e-Imtiaz (Military) (Star of Excellence)
Sitara-e-Basalat (Star of Good Conduct)	Tamgha-e-Baqa (Nuclear Test Medal) 1998	Tamgha-e-Istaqlal Pakistan (Escalation with India Medal) 2002	Tamgha-e-Azm (Medal of Conviction) (2018)
10 Years Service Medal	20 Years Service Medal	30 Years Service Medal	35 Years Service Medal
40 Years Service Medal	Jamhuriat Tamgha (Democracy Medal) 1988	Qarardad-e-Pakistan Tamgha (Resolution Day Golden Jubilee Medal) 1990	Tamgha-e-Salgirah Pakistan (Independence Day Golden Jubilee Medal) 1997
Command & Staff College Quetta Student Medal	National Order of Merit - Knight (France)	Turkish Legion of Merit (Turkey)	Military Merit Order 1st Class (UAE)

=== Foreign decorations ===
Foreign awards
France	National Order of Merit - Knight (Chevalier)
Turkey	Turkish Legion of Merit
UAE	Military Merit Order First Class

== Dates of rank ==
Insignia	Rank	Date
	Admiral (CNS)	October 2020
	Vice admiral	January 2019
	Rear admiral	July 2015
	Commodore	February 2011
	Captain	September 2007
	Commander	June 2002
	Lieutenant commander	October 1995
	Lieutenant	July 1988
	Sub-lieutenant	June 1986
	Midshipman	June 1985

Military offices
Preceded by Zafar Mahmood Abbasi	Chief of the Naval Staff; 2020 – present	Incumbent
