= Zafar Mahmood Abbasi =

16th Naval Chief of Pakistan

Admiral Zafar Mahmood Abbasi NI(M) HI(M) SI(M) BJSN
- ظفر محمود عباسى
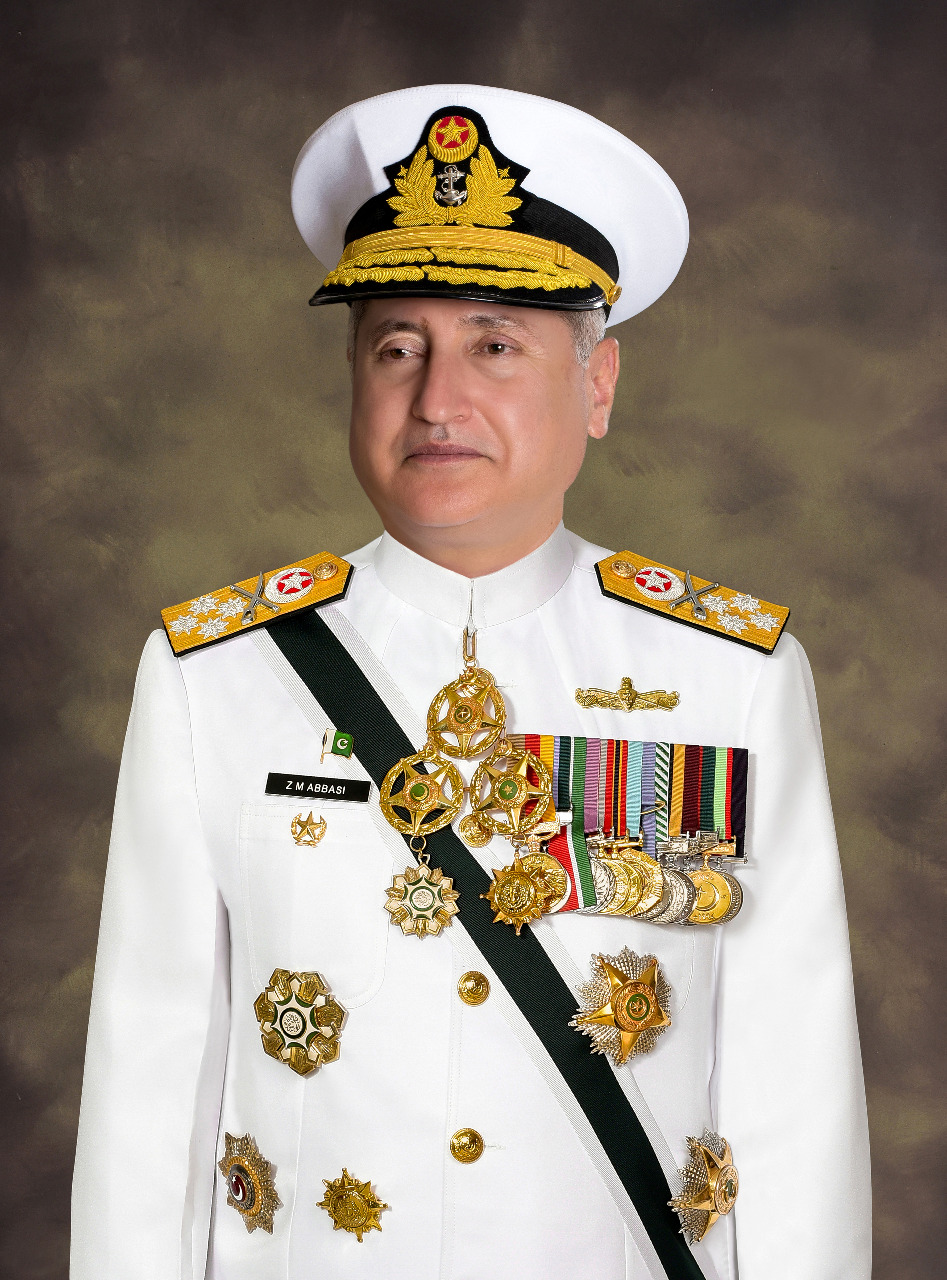
- Military career
- Allegiance: Pakistan
- Branch: Pakistan Navy
- Service years: 1979–2020
- Rank: Admiral
- Nickname: Z.M. Abbasi
- Service number: PN-2381
- Commands: Vice Chief of the Naval Staff; Combined Task Force 150; Commander Pakistan Marines; Commander Logistic; Pakistan Maritime Security Agency; 25th Destroyer Squadron
- Conflicts: 2001–2002 India–Pakistan standoff; Insurgency in Khyber Pakhtunkhwa; Operation Enduring Freedom – Horn of Africa; 2016 Indian Line of Control strike; 2019 India–Pakistan border skirmishes
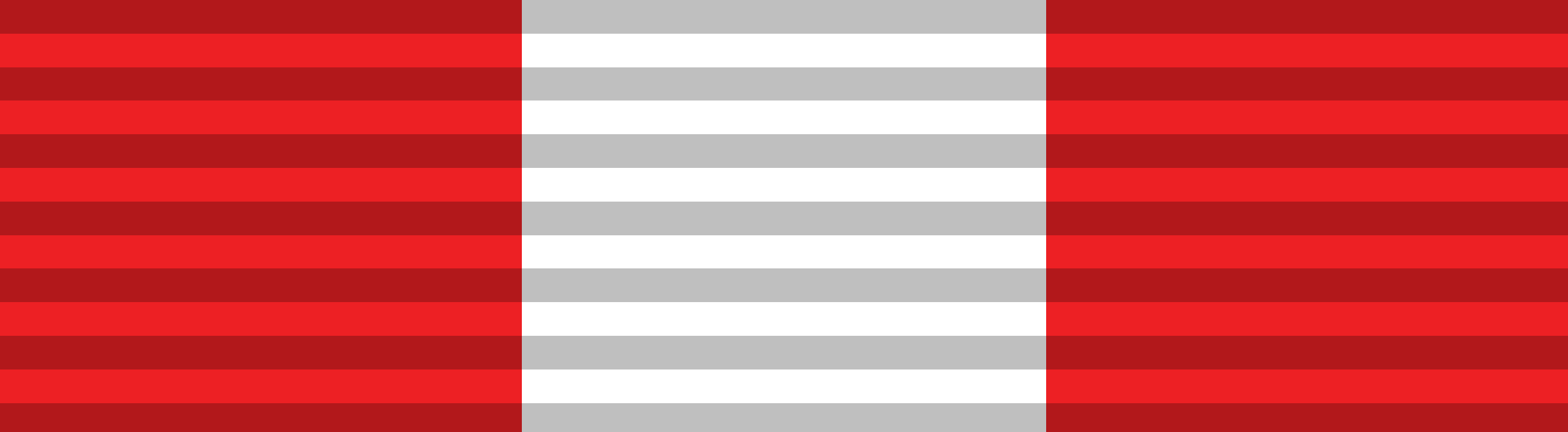
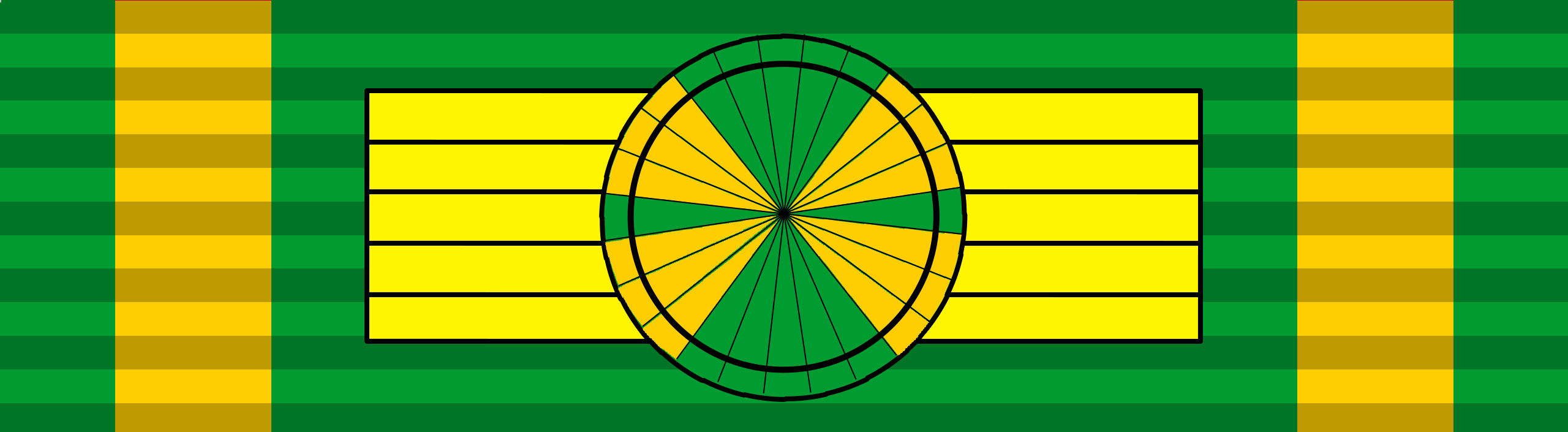
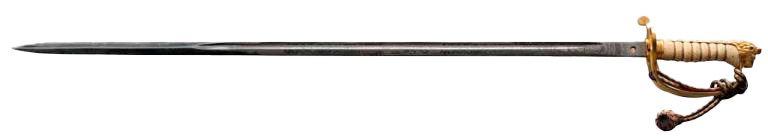
- Awards: Nishan-e-Imtiaz (Military); Hilal-e-Imtiaz (Military); Sitara-e-Imtiaz (Military); Turkish Legion of Merit; Order of King Abdulaziz; Bintang Jalasena Utama; Sword of Honour

Zafar Mahmood Abbasi NI(M) HI(M) SI(M) BJSN (Urdu: ظفر محمود عباسى) is a retired four-star admiral of the Pakistan Navy who served as the 21st Chief of the Naval Staff (CNS) of Pakistan Navy from 7 October 2017 until 7 October 2020.

== Career ==
Abbasi joined the Pakistan Navy in 1979 after graduating from Cadet College Hasanabdal. He was educated at the Pakistan Naval Academy and did his initial training at the Britannia Royal Naval College in Dartmouth in the United Kingdom. He was commissioned in the Navy as a Lieutenant in 1981 upon graduating from the Naval Academy and was conferred with the Sword of Honour. He served as an executive officer in a Tariq-class destroyer.

Later he joined the Submarine Branch, and specialised in underwater warfare in Pakistan as well as qualified for the surface warfare from the United States.

He is a graduate of the Royal Australian Naval College, attending it in 1989, and attained a B.S., and a MSc from the National Defence University.

His command assignment included his role as commandant of the Naval Academy, as well as Director-General of the Pakistan Maritime Security Agency, which he commanded from 2010 until 2011. From 2001 to 2003, he was the commanding officer of the PNS Khaiber. From 2005 until 2007, he commanded the 21st Mine Squadron and 25th Destroyer Squadron. In 2008, he was promoted to one-star rank, Commodore, and was the Assistant Chief of the Naval Staff (Operations) and later, the Assistant Chief of the Naval Staff (Plans), until he was promoted to two-star rank in 2010.

Rear-Admiral Abbasi took over the command of the Combined Task Force 150 which he led from April 2010 until October 2010. In 2013, Rear-Admiral Abbasi took over the command as Commander Logistics (COMLOG) but this was a short-lived appointment.

In 2013, Rear-Admiral Abbasi was appointed as the Commander of the Karachi Coast (COMCOAST), becoming Flag officer commanding (FOC) of the Pakistan Marines.

In 2014, Rear-Admiral Abbasi was appointed as fleet commander of the Pakistan Navy as Commander, Pakistan Fleet (COMPAK) with three-star rank promotion.

In 2014, Vice-Admiral Abbasi was a contender to be appointed as a four-star admiral and take over the command of the Navy as its Chief of Naval Staff, along with Vice-Admiral Khan Hasham bin Saddique and Vice-Admiral Syed Arifullah Hussaini. However, the most senior admiral in the Navy, Admiral Mohammad Zakaullah was promoted to the four-star appointment, He continued serving as the Deputy Chief of the Naval Staff (Operations) at the Naval Headquarters.

Upon the retirement of Vice-Admiral Khan Hasham bin Saddique, Vice-Admiral Abbasi took over as the vice chief of naval staff in June 2017.

== Chief of Naval Staff ==
On 3 October 2017, Vice-Admiral Abbasi was promoted to four-star admiral in the Navy, and was announced by the MoD of his appointment to take over the command of the Navy as Chief of Naval Staff. He supersedes no one and was the senior most-ranking admiral in the Navy.

On 7 October 2017, Admiral Abbasi took over the command of the Navy as Chief of Naval Staff from outgoing Admiral Muhammad Zakaullah at the PNS Zafar in Islamabad.

On 30 October 2017, Admiral Abbasi was conferred and honored with Nishan-e-Imtiaz (Military) by the President Mamnoon Hussain for "recognition of his long meritorious services, exceptionally commendable performance and inspirational devotion to duty."

On 15 December 2017, Admiral Abbasi was conferred with "Legion of Merit of the Turkish Armed Forces" by Commander Turkish Naval Forces, Vice Admiral Adnan Ozbal during his official visit to Turkey.

On 13 March 2018, Abbasi was awarded with Saudi Arabia's Order of King Abdulaziz by the Chief of General Staff of the Royal Saudi Armed Forces Fayyadh Al Ruwaili.

On 1 February 2020, Abbasi was awarded Bintang Jalasena Utama, Indonesia's highest military award.

He retired from the Pakistan Navy as Chief of the Naval Staff on 7 October 2020.

== Awards and decorations ==

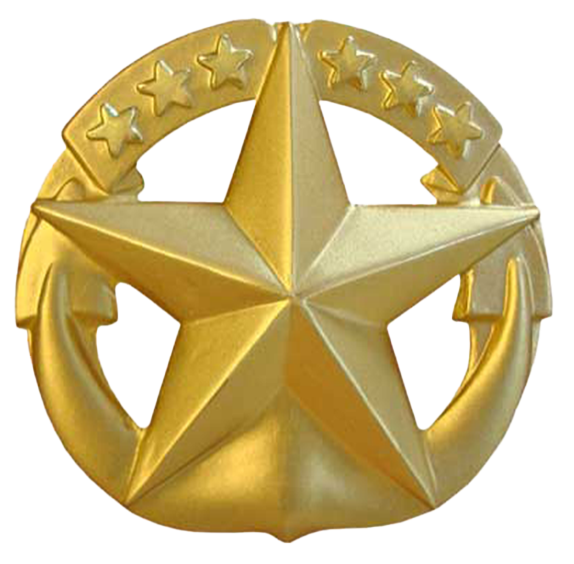

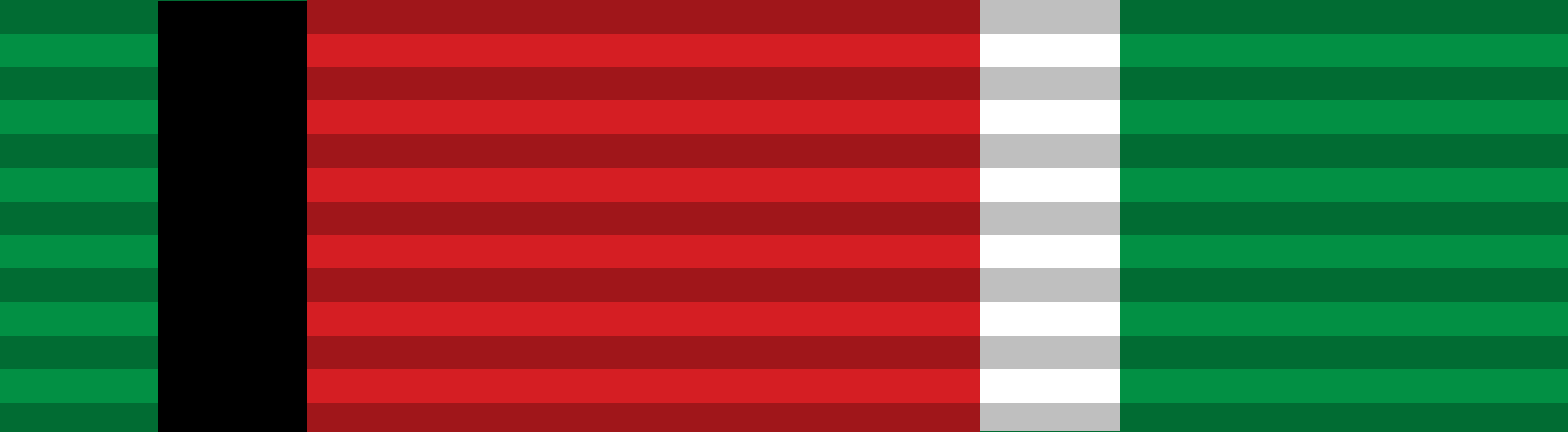

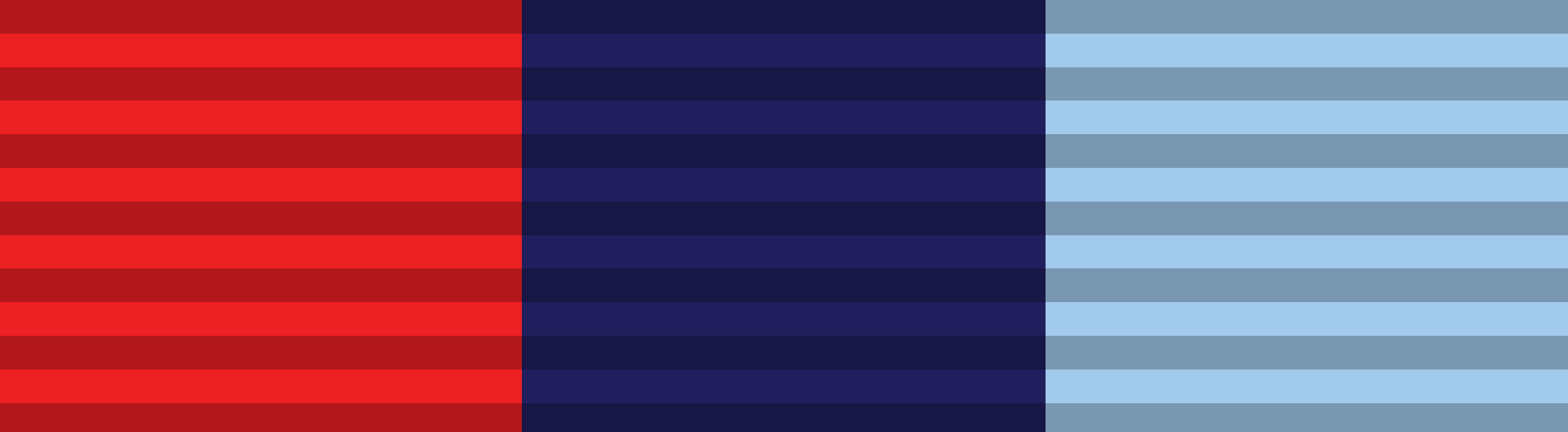

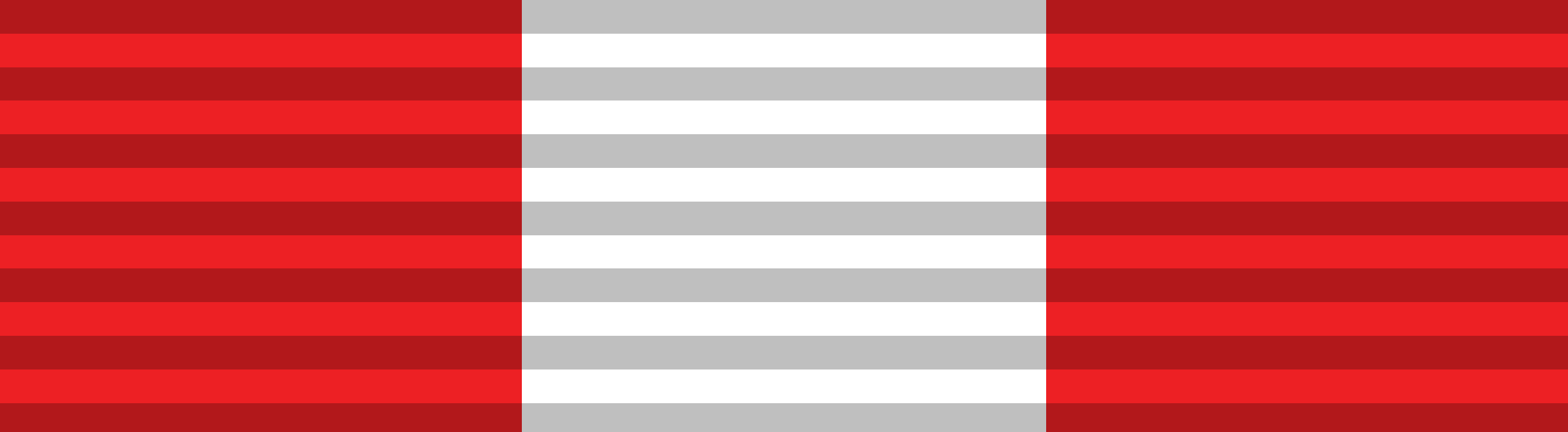

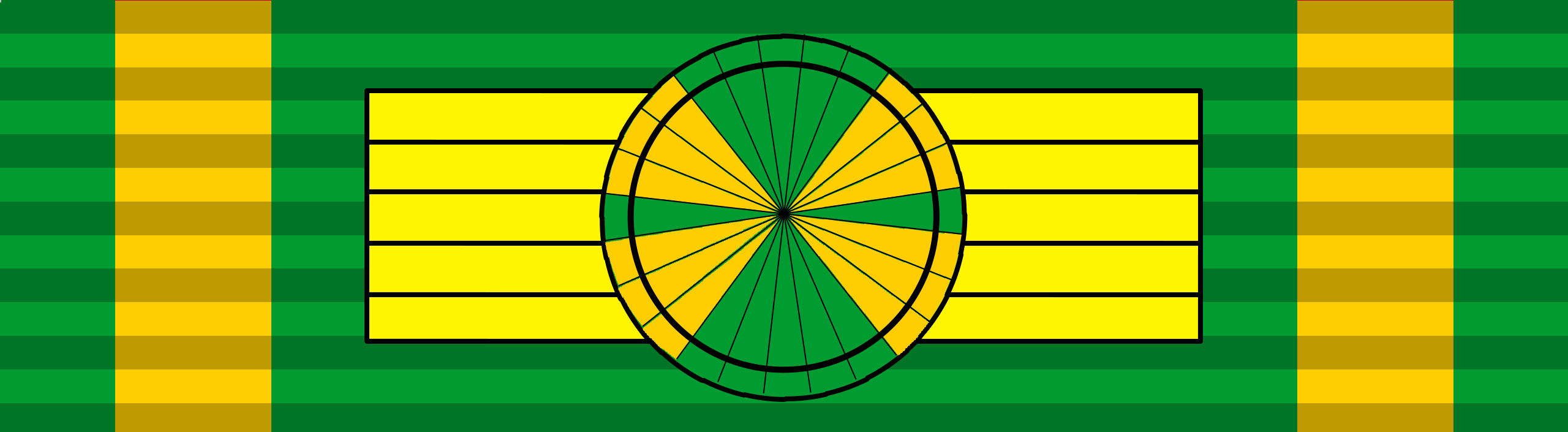

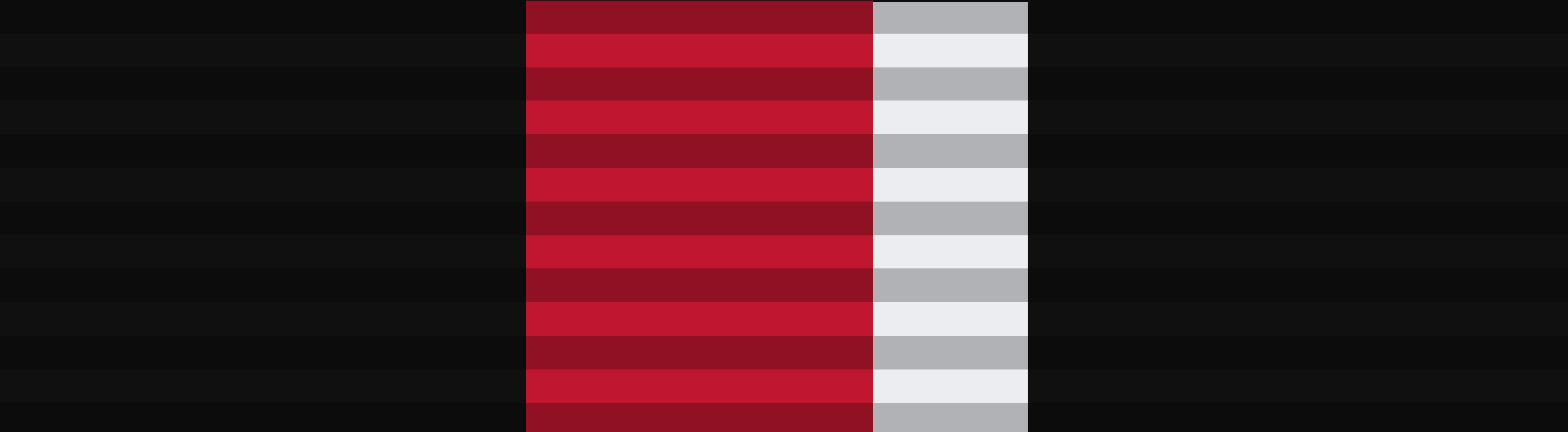

Pakistan Navy Operations Branch Badge
Command at Sea insignia
Nishan-e-Imtiaz (Military) (Order of Excellence)	Hilal-e-Imtiaz (Military) (Crescent of Excellence)	Sitara-e-Imtiaz (Military) (Star of Excellence)	Tamgha-e-Baqa (Nuclear Test Medal) 1998
Tamgha-e-Istaqlal Pakistan (Escalation with India Medal) 2002	Tamgha-e-Azm (Medal of Conviction) (2018)	10 Years Service Medal	20 Years Service Medal
30 Years Service Medal	35 Years Service Medal	40 Years Service Medal	Tamgha-e-Sad Saala Jashan-e- Wiladat-e-Quaid-e-Azam (100th Birth Anniversary of Muhammad Ali Jinnah) 1976
Hijri Tamgha (Hijri Medal) 1979	Jamhuriat Tamgha (Democracy Medal) 1988	Qarardad-e-Pakistan Tamgha (Resolution Day Golden Jubilee Medal) 1990	Tamgha-e-Salgirah Pakistan (Independence Day Golden Jubilee Medal) 1997
Turkish Legion of Merit (Turkey)	Order of King Abdulaziz (Saudi Arabia)	Britannia Royal Naval College Medal	Bintang Jalasena Utama (Indonesia)

=== Foreign decorations ===
Foreign Awards
Turkey	Turkish Legion of Merit
Saudi Arabia	Order of King Abdulaziz
UK	Britannia Royal Naval College Medal
Indonesia	Bintang Jalasena Utama

Military offices
Preceded by Admiral Muhammad Zakaullah	Chief of Naval Staff; 7 October 2017 – 7 October 2020	Succeeded by Admiral Muhammad Amjad Khan Niazi
