= Saeed Mohammad Khan =

Pakistani admiral (1935–2022)

Admiral Saeed Mohammad Khan NI(M) HI(M) SI(M) SBt

12th Chief of Naval Staff
- In office 9 November 1991 – 9 November 1994
- President: Ghulam Ishaq Khan; Wasim Sajjad (acting); Farooq Leghari
- Prime Minister: Nawaz Sharif; Moeenuddin Ahmad Qureshi (caretaker); Benazir Bhutto
- Preceded by: Yastur-ul-Haq Malik
- Succeeded by: Mansurul Haq

Chairman, Pakistan National Shipping Corporation
- In office 11 November 1988 – 13 December 1990

Pakistan Ambassador to the Netherlands
- In office 1994–1998
- Prime Minister: Benazir Bhutto; Nawaz Sharif

Personal details
- Born: 1 October 1935 Bhopal, Bhopal State, British India
- Died: 4 December 2022 (aged 87) Islamabad, Pakistan
- Resting place: H-11 Cemetery, Islamabad
- Awards: Nishan-e-Imtiaz (Military); Hilal-e-Imtiaz (Military); Sitara-e-Imtiaz (Military); Sitara-e-Basalat; Legion of Merit (United States)
- Nickname: "Beast of the Sea"

Military service
- Allegiance: Pakistan
- Branch/service: Pakistan Navy
- Years of service: 1954–1994
- Rank: Admiral
- Unit: Operations Branch
- Commands: Vice Chief of Naval Staff; Commander Pakistan Fleet; Flag Officer Sea Training
- Battles/wars: Indo-Pakistani war of 1965; Indo-Pakistani war of 1971

Saeed Mohammad Khan (1 October 1935 – 4 December 2022) was a Pakistan Navy officer who served as the 12th Chief of Naval Staff of the Pakistan Navy from 9 November 1991 to 9 November 1994. Following his retirement, he served as Pakistan's Ambassador to the Netherlands from 1994 to 1998.

== Early life ==
Saeed Mohammad Khan was born on 1 October 1935 in Bhopal, in the princely state of Bhopal in British India, into a Bhopali Pathan family. His family migrated to Pakistan after the partition of India in 1947 and settled in Karachi.

== Naval career ==
Khan was commissioned as a midshipman in the Operations Branch of the Pakistan Navy in 1954 and was sent to the United Kingdom for training as a navigation specialist at HMS Dryad. On returning to Pakistan in 1958 he was promoted to sub-lieutenant and posted to Tariq in the gunnery branch.

During the 1960s, Khan commanded Tariq and saw action in the 1965 and 1971 wars with India as a gunnery specialist; according to a memoir by a contemporary, his superiors gave him the nickname "Beast of the Sea".

=== Senior appointments ===
Khan served as Flag Officer Sea Training from 1980 to 1984 in the rank of rear admiral. In 1984 he was appointed Commander Pakistan Fleet (COMPAK) as a vice admiral, and subsequently Vice Chief of Naval Staff under Admiral Yastur-ul-Haq Malik.

From 11 November 1988 to 13 December 1990, Khan served as Chairman of the Pakistan National Shipping Corporation.

=== Chief of Naval Staff ===
Khan was promoted to four-star rank on 11 August 1991 and assumed command as Chief of Naval Staff on 9 November 1991, succeeding Admiral Yastur-ul-Haq Malik.

His tenure coincided with the imposition of the Pressler Amendment sanctions by the United States, which compelled Pakistan to return four Garcia-class frigates and four Brooke-class frigates leased from the United States Navy in 1988 at the conclusion of their five-year lease. To replace this lost capacity, Khan negotiated with First Sea Lord Admiral Sir Julian Oswald and the British government for the acquisition of the Royal Navy's remaining Type 21 frigates. The agreement, building on earlier negotiations begun under Admiral Tariq Kamal Khan in 1987–88, resulted in the transfer of six frigates between 1993 and 1995, which were subsequently reclassified in Pakistani service as the Tariq-class destroyers.

In 1994, Khan reportedly recommended that the Pakistan Navy acquire the British Upholder-class submarine in preference to the French Agosta 90B-class. The recommendation was not adopted, and the Bhutto government proceeded with the Agosta 90B purchase from France.

== Ambassadorship and later life ==
Khan handed over command of the navy to Admiral Mansurul Haq on 9 November 1994. He was subsequently appointed Pakistan's Ambassador to the Netherlands by Prime Minister Benazir Bhutto and served in The Hague for approximately four years.

Khan died in Islamabad on 4 December 2022, aged 87, and was buried at the H-11 Cemetery in the city.

== Awards and decorations ==

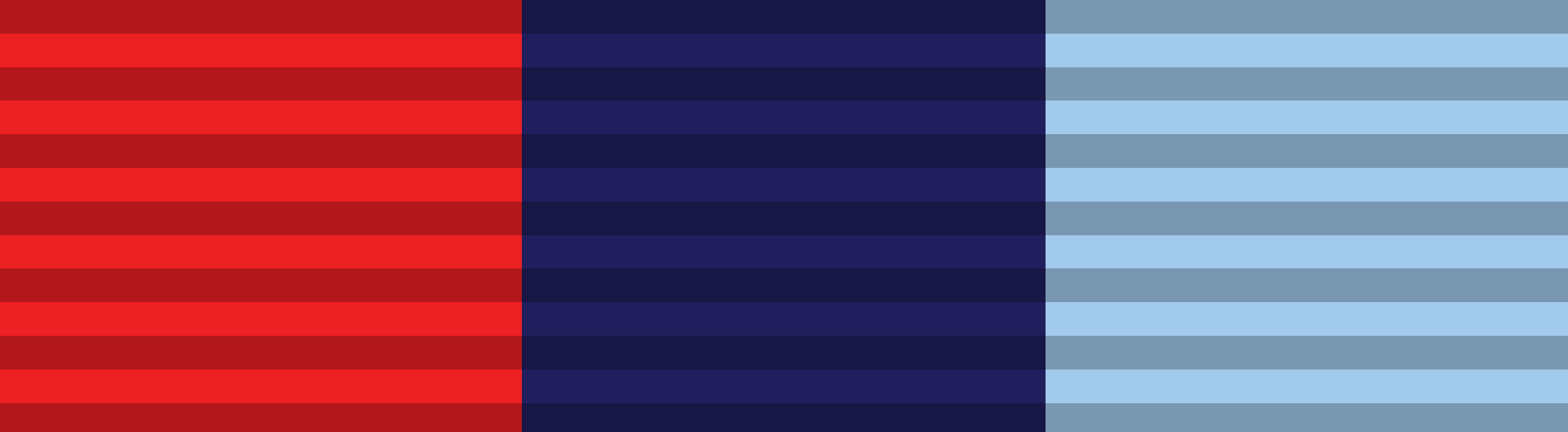

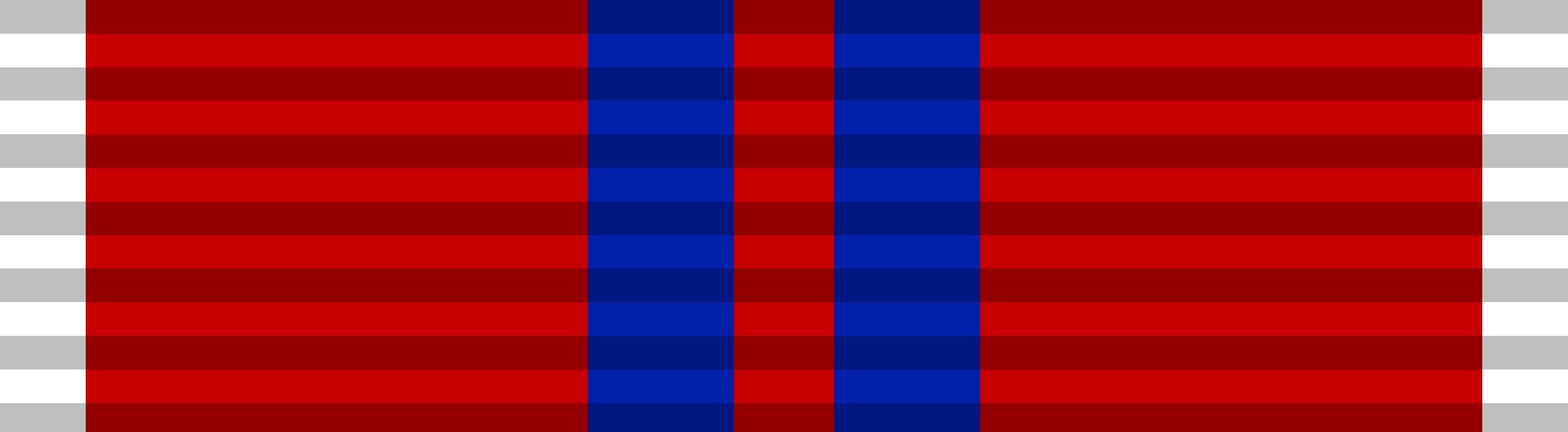

| Nishan-e-Imtiaz (Military); Order of Excellence | Hilal-e-Imtiaz (Military); Crescent of Excellence | Sitara-e-Imtiaz (Military); Star of Excellence | Sitara-e-Basalat; Star of Good Conduct |
| Tamgha-e-Diffa; General Service Medal (1965 and 1971 War clasps) | Sitara-e-Harb 1965 War; War Star 1965 | Sitara-e-Harb 1971 War; War Star 1971 | Tamgha-e-Jang 1965 War; War Medal 1965 |
| Tamgha-e-Jang 1971 War; War Medal 1971 | 10 Years Service Medal | 20 Years Service Medal | 30 Years Service Medal |
| 40 Years Service Medal | Tamgha-e-Sad Saala Jashan-e-Wiladat-e-Quaid-e-Azam; 100th Birth Anniversary of Muhammad Ali Jinnah (1976) | Tamgha-e-Jamhuria; Republic Commemoration Medal (1956) | Hijri Tamgha; Hijri Medal (1979) |
| Jamhuriat Tamgha; Democracy Medal (1988) | Qarardad-e-Pakistan Tamgha; Resolution Day Golden Jubilee Medal (1990) | Queen Elizabeth II Coronation Medal (1953, United Kingdom) | Legion of Merit (Officer, United States) |

Military offices
| Preceded by Yastur-ul-Haq Malik | Chief of Naval Staff; 1991–1994 | Succeeded by Mansurul Haq |
