= PNS Hameed =

VLF radio transmission facility of the Pakistan Navy

- Karachi, Sindh, Pakistan

Site information
- Type: Radio transmitter facility
- Controlled by: Pakistan Navy
- Condition: Active

Location
- Coordinates: 24.9302°N 66.8807°E

Site history
- In use: 15 November 2016 – present (9 years, 8 months)

PNS Hameed (Urdu: پایگاه بحریہ حمید) is a very low frequency (VLF) radio transmitter facility of the Pakistan Navy (PN), located near the coastal areas of Karachi, Sindh, Pakistan. The primary purpose and mission of the naval base is to enable communication with deployed PN submarines while they are submerged in the Arabian Sea at a very low frequency. It is the first facility with very low frequency transmission capabilities in Pakistan.

The base was commissioned by the Chairman Joint Chiefs of Staff General Rashad Mahmood and Chief of Naval Staff Admiral Muhammad Zakaullah on 15 November 2016. PNS Hameed was named in the memory of Lieutenant-Commander Pervez Hameed, the first officer of the PNS Ghazi, which sank in an accident during the Indo-Pakistani Naval War of 1971.

According to researcher Mansoor Ahmed, the facility is vital for command and control of submarines carrying a nuclear deterrent patrol, and the establishment of the facility essentially confirms Pakistan has established a preliminary, sea-based arm of its nuclear deterrent.
