= Muhammad Zakaullah =

Pakistani Navy officer (born 1958)

Admiral Muhammad Zakaullah NI(M) HI(M) SI(M) PP TI(M) PGAT
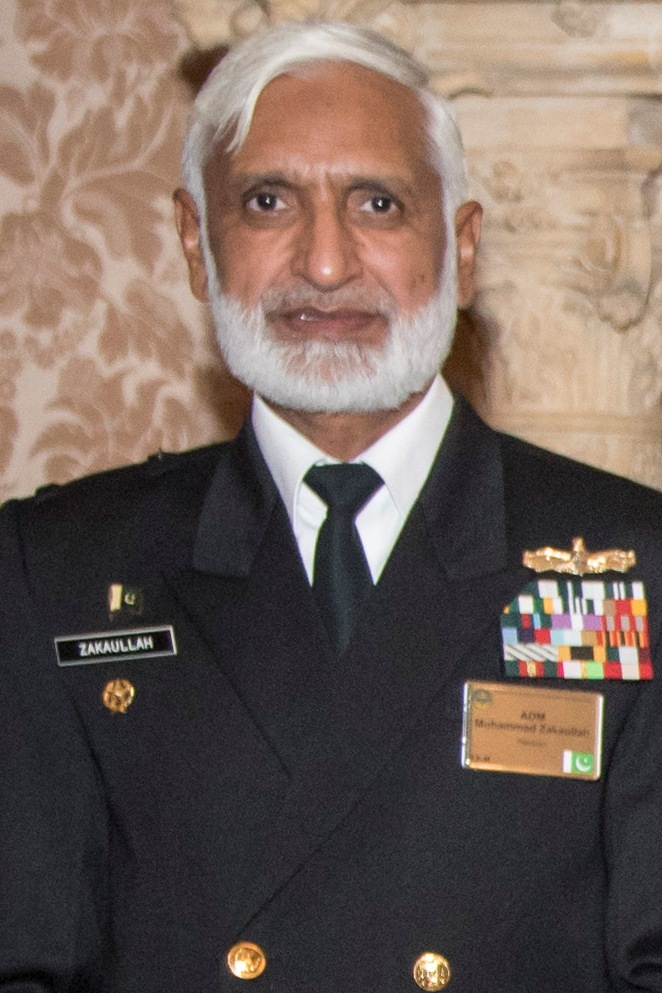

Chief of Naval Staff
- In office 2 October 2014 – 7 October 2017
- Preceded by: Adm. Asif Sandila
- Succeeded by: Adm. Zafar Mahmood Abbasi

Director-General of the National Accountability Bureau
- In office 16 November 1999 – 17 November 2003
- Preceded by: Office established
- Succeeded by: Lt-Gen. Shahid Aziz

Personal details
- Born: Muhammad Zakaullah; 10 January 1958 (age 68) Lyallpur, Punjab, Pakistan (Now Faisalabad, Punjab in Pakistan)
- Citizenship: Pakistan
- Nickname: ZAK

Military service
- Allegiance: Pakistan
- Branch/service: Pakistan Navy
- Years of service: 1975–2017
- Rank: Admiral
- Unit: Naval Operations Branch
- Commands: Vice Chief of Naval Staff; Commander Pakistan Fleet; DCNS (Ops); DCNS (Trig.); Combined Task Force 150; Ins-Gen. Naval Police; Pakistan Naval Academy
- Battles/wars: Indo-Pakistani wars and conflicts: Indo-Pakistani standoff in 2001; Indo-Pakistani skirmishes in 2013; India–Pakistan skirmishes in 2014; Indo-Pakistani confrontation in 2016; Piracy off the coast of Somalia: Operation Restore Hope; War in Afghanistan: War in North-West Pakistan; Zarb-i-Azb; Operation Decisive Storm: Blockade of Yemen
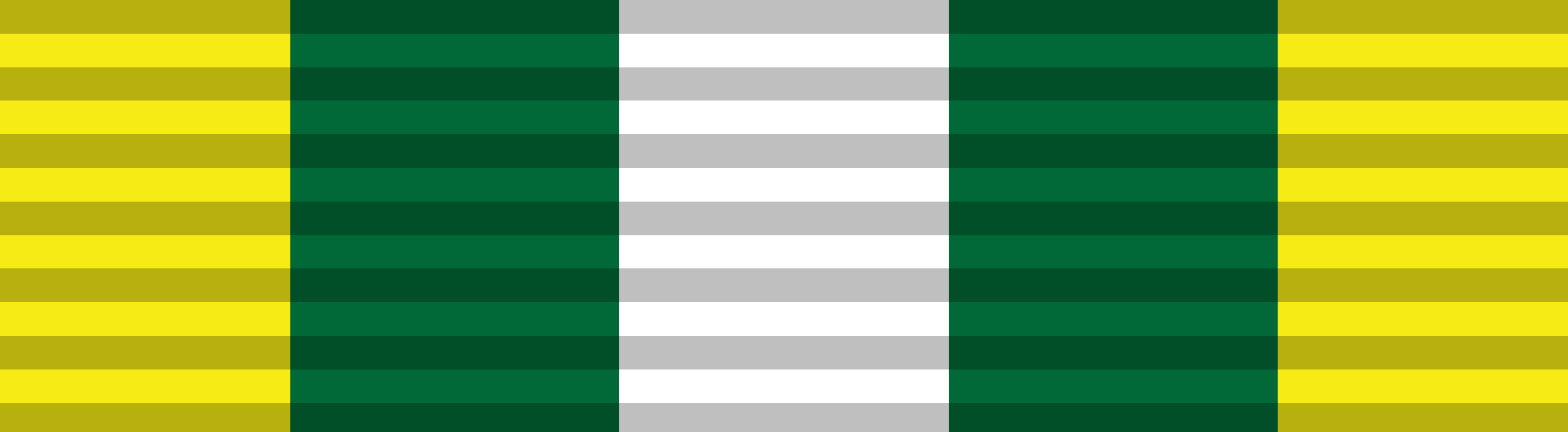
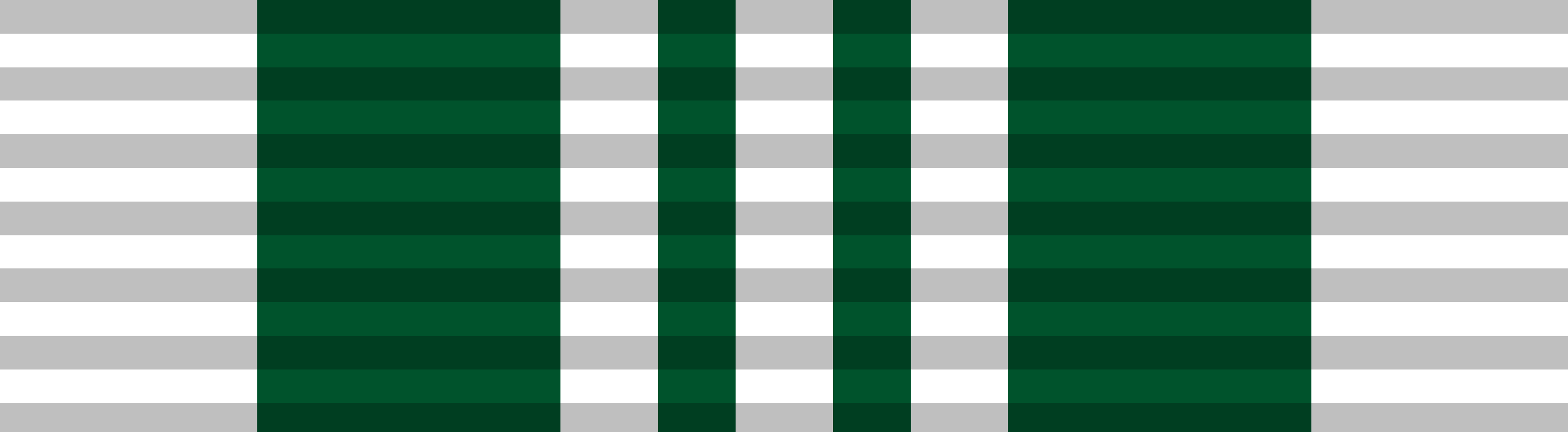
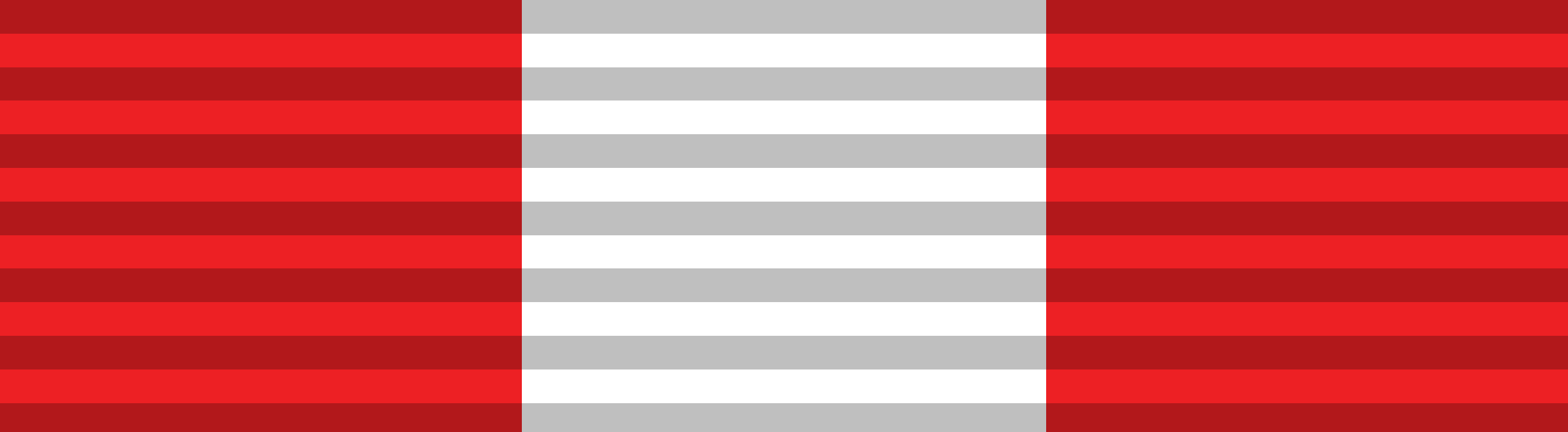
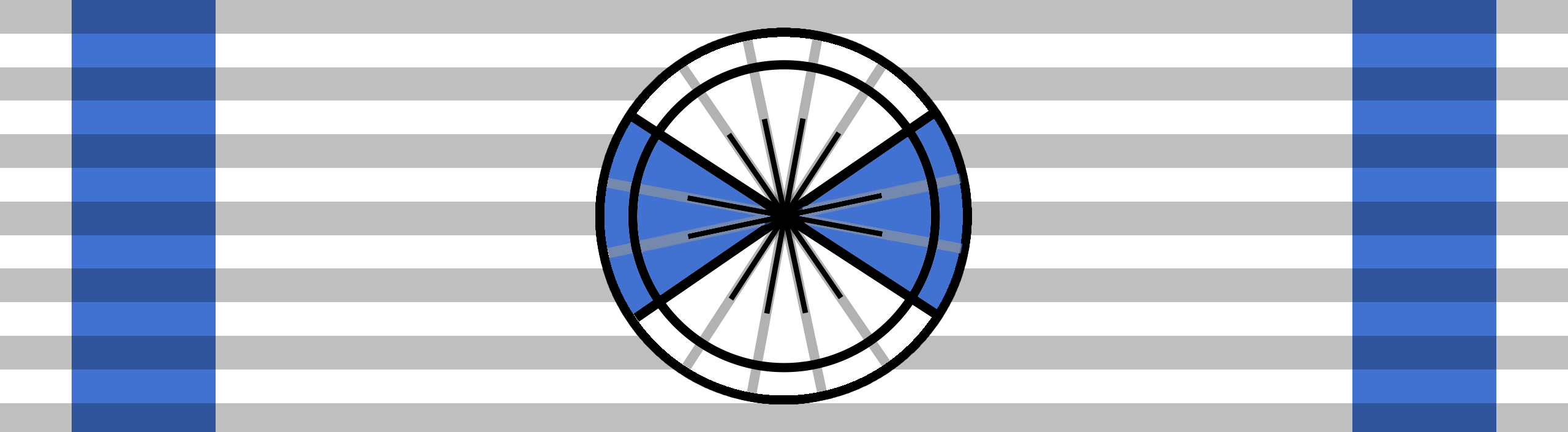
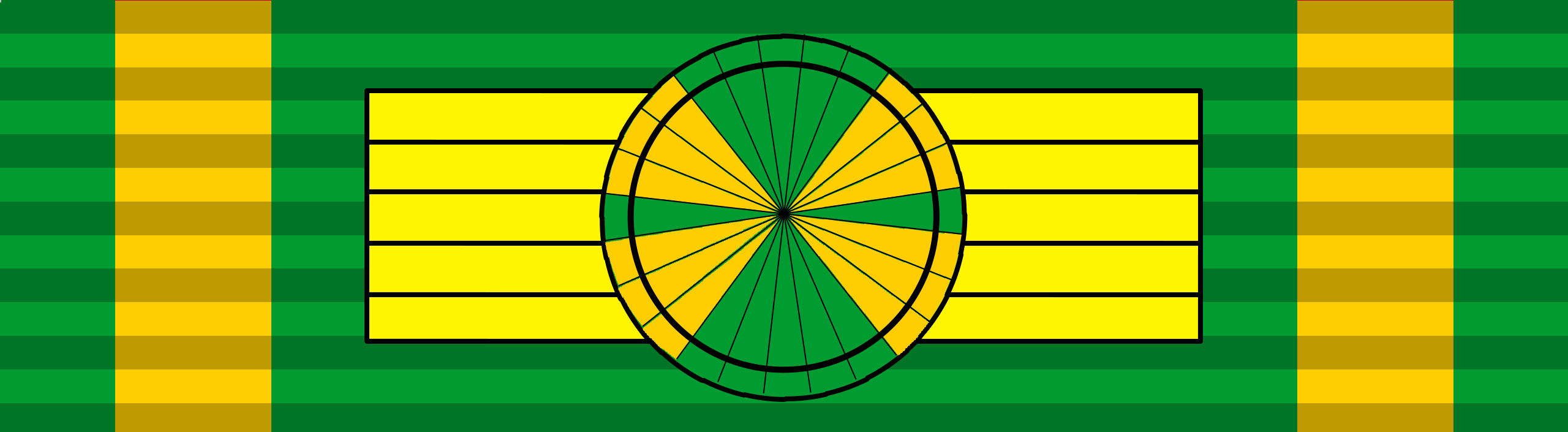
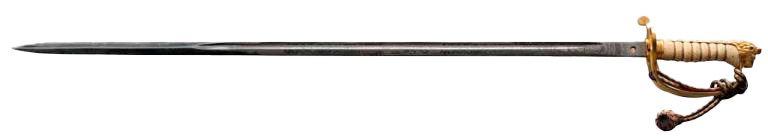
- Awards: Nishan-e-Imtiaz (Military) Hilal-e-Imtiaz (Military) Sitara-e-Imtiaz (Military) Pride of Performance Tamgha-i-Imtiaz (Military) Turkish Legion of Merit CISM Medal of Merit Legion of Merit Order of AbdulAziz Order of Military Service Sword of Honour

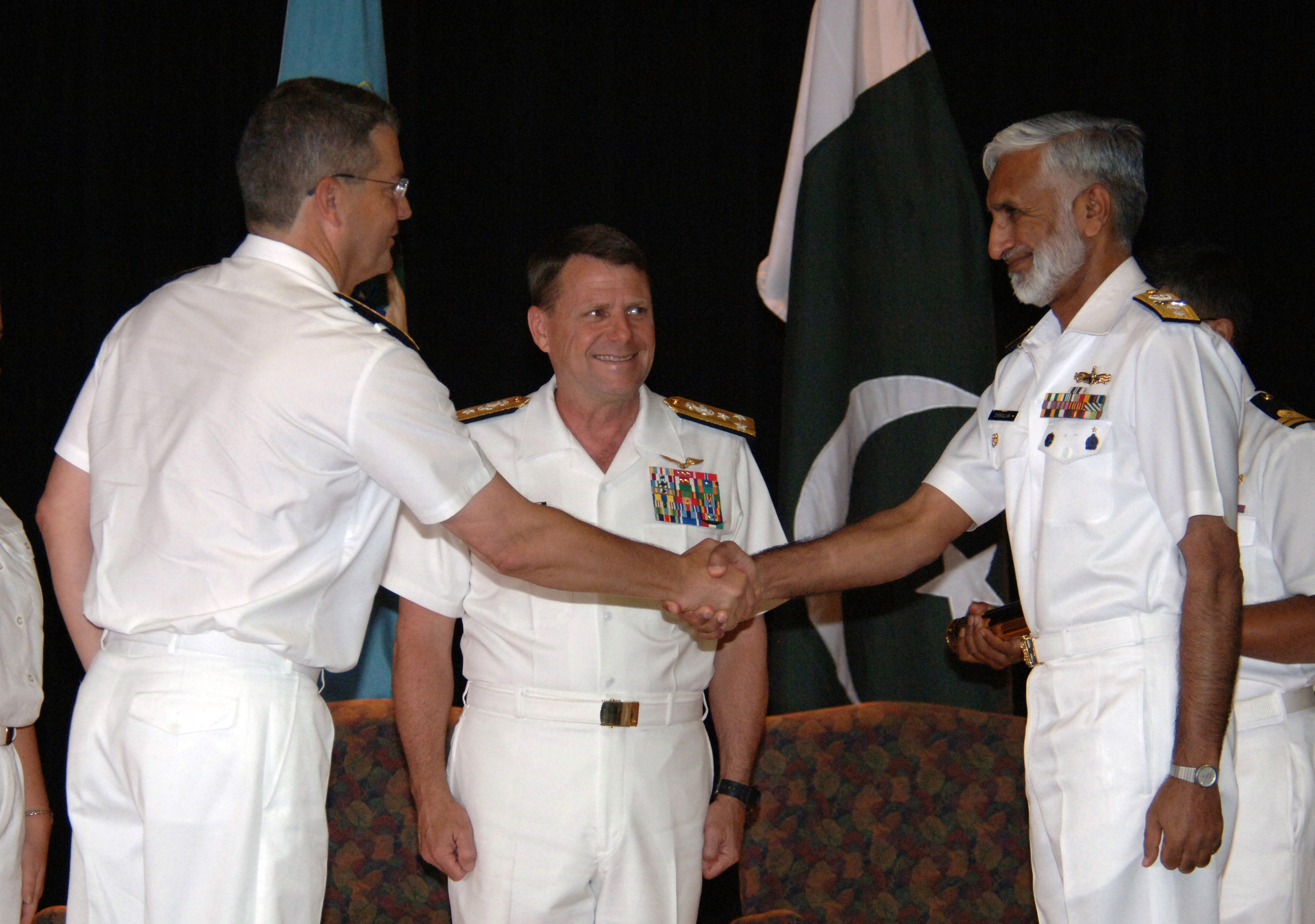
Admiral Zakaullah (right)

Muhammad Zakaullah NI(M) HI(M) SI(M) PP TI(M) PGAT (Urdu: محمد ذكاءالله ; born 10 January 1958) is a retired admiral in the Pakistan Navy, who was the 20th Chief of Naval Staff of the Pakistan Navy. He was succeeded by Admiral Zafar Mahmood Abbasi.

He is noted for his sportsmanship, having represented Pakistan at the Olympics for a sailing class category and being a gold medallist at the 1990 Asian Games, for which he is a recipient of a national honor.

As naval chief, Admiral Zakaullah is noted for revolutionizing the role of the navy, emphasizing the role of the navy in economic corridor with China and took initiatives to strengthened ties with the Turkish Navy. He also played an active role in establishing the very low frequency facility to provide communications with the submarines as well as ensuring the second-strike capability by commissioning the cruise missile system in the strategic command of the Navy.

== Biography ==
=== Early life and career in Navy ===
Muhammad Zakaullah was born into a Muhajir (Ethnic Indian) family in Lyalpur (now Faisalabad) in Punjab, Pakistan on 10 January 1958. After graduating from Cadet College Hasan Abdal, he joined the Pakistan Navy in 1975 where he was sent to join the Pakistan Naval Academy, graduating at the top of his class, he was conferred with the coveted Sword of Honour and awarded the chief of the naval staff gold medal at his graduation. Sub-Lieutenant Zakaullah gained commission in the Operations Branch, and was sent to United Kingdom for his training and education later in his career.

He did his military training from the Royal Naval Staff College, and later attended the London University where he gained MA in Defence studies. He also attended and graduated from the Quaid-e-Azam University, having attained an MSc in War Studies.

Upon returning to Pakistan, he joined the faculty of National Defence University to teach war studies.

=== War and staff appointments ===
Zakaullah qualified as a surface officer from the United Kingdom, serving first on the Babur which he later commanded as Commander. He also served as a naval attaché at the Pakistan Embassy, Doha in Qatar. Captain Zakaullah served as the Directing Staff at the Pakistan Naval War College before taken as secondment by the President Musharraf.

His other command appointments included his role as Chief Inspector of Naval Police and military secretary to Prime Minister Shaukat Aziz for a short period of time. Rear-Admiral Zakaullah also commanded the CTF–150 in Arabian Sea to guard off operations on Somalian piracy.

At the Naval Headquarters, he was appointed as ACNS (Plans), DCNS (Training and Personnel), and DCNS (Operation).

Vice-Admiral Zakaullah's last war assignment included command of the Pakistan Fleet as its senior commander.

At the height of border escalation with India, he reportedly responded to the media that Pakistan had the ability to respond to any disturbance of border.

In an emergency address to the media representatives at the ISPR directorate, he quoted to the media that "Pakistan forces are prepared for any critical situation." Answering the question of Indian Army's capabilities, Admiral Zakaullah said that Pakistan was not concerned by New Delhi's ground capability as it had the ability to defend itself against any aggression.

== Government appointments ==
Zakaullah was a close ally of President Pervez Musharraf. To support President Musharraf's anti-corruption campaign, Commodore Zakaullah was appointed as Director-General of the National Accountability Bureau from 1999 till 2003, before taking over the command of the 25th Destroyer Squadron.

== Chief of Naval Staff ==
In 2014, Vice-Admiral Zakuallah was promoted to four-star rank admiral. He became the first naval chief in the history of Pakistan who was a Sword of Honour recipient.

== Sportsmanship ==
He is a keen yachtsman and has represented Pakistan at numerous international sailing events, including at the 1984 Summer Olympics and the 1986 and 1990 Asian Games. He won a gold medal each at the two editions of Asian Games. He is also a recipient of President's Award for Pride of Performance for outstanding performance in yachting.

== Awards and decorations ==

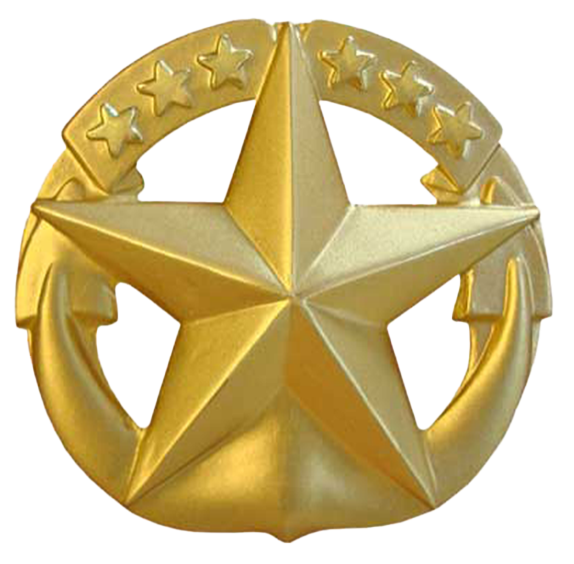

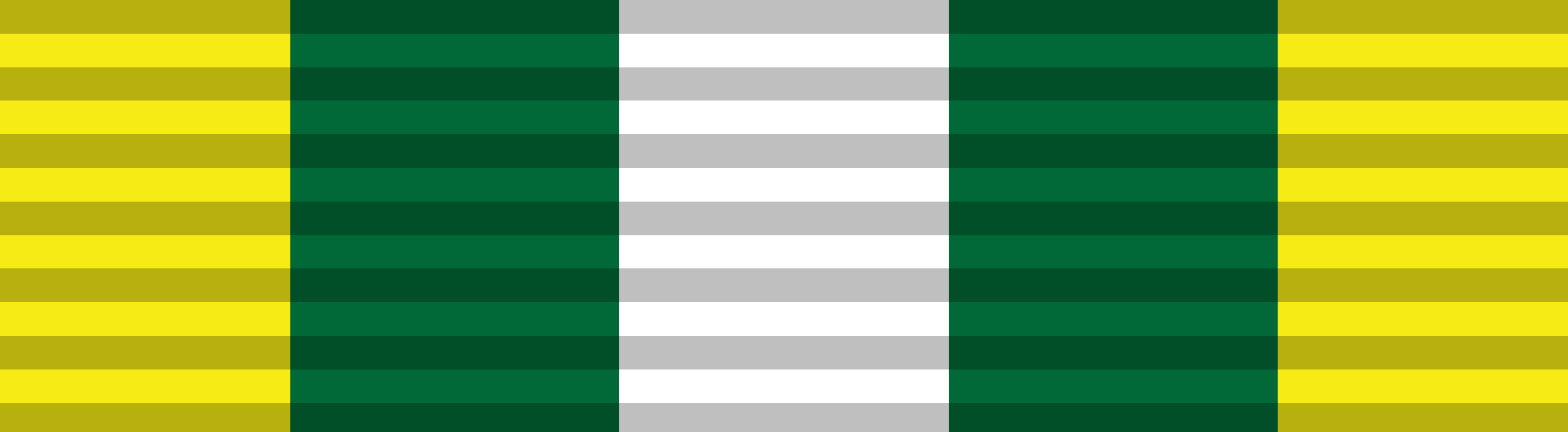

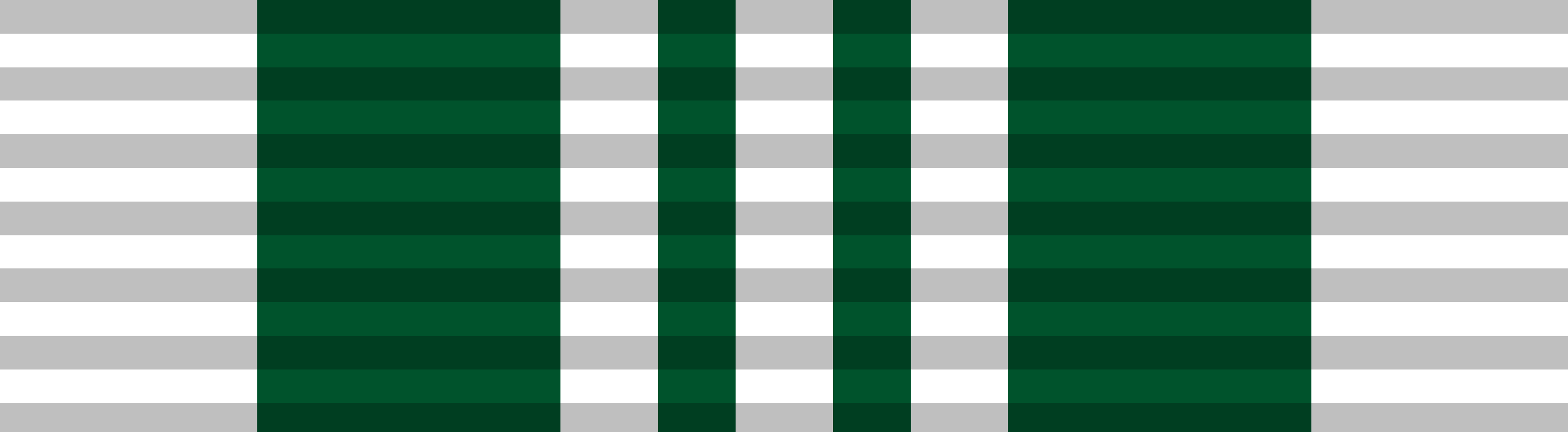

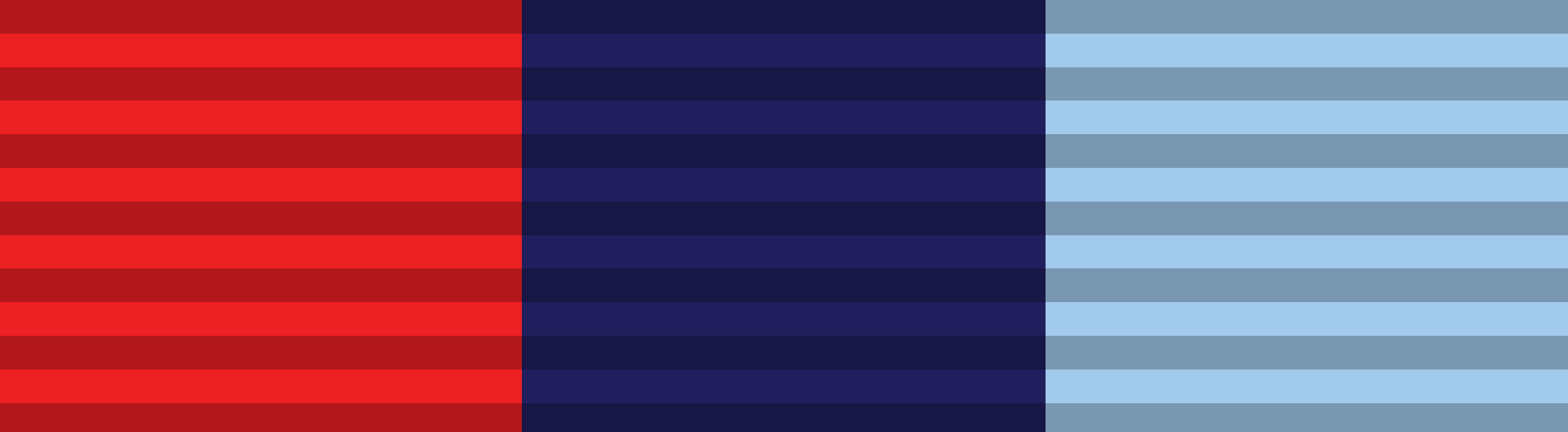

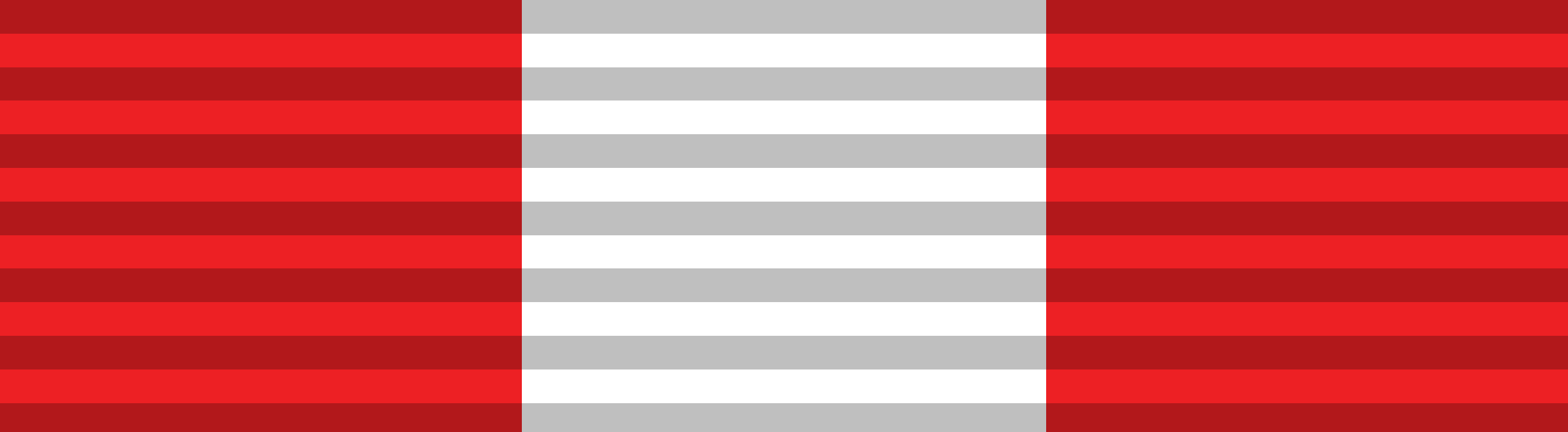

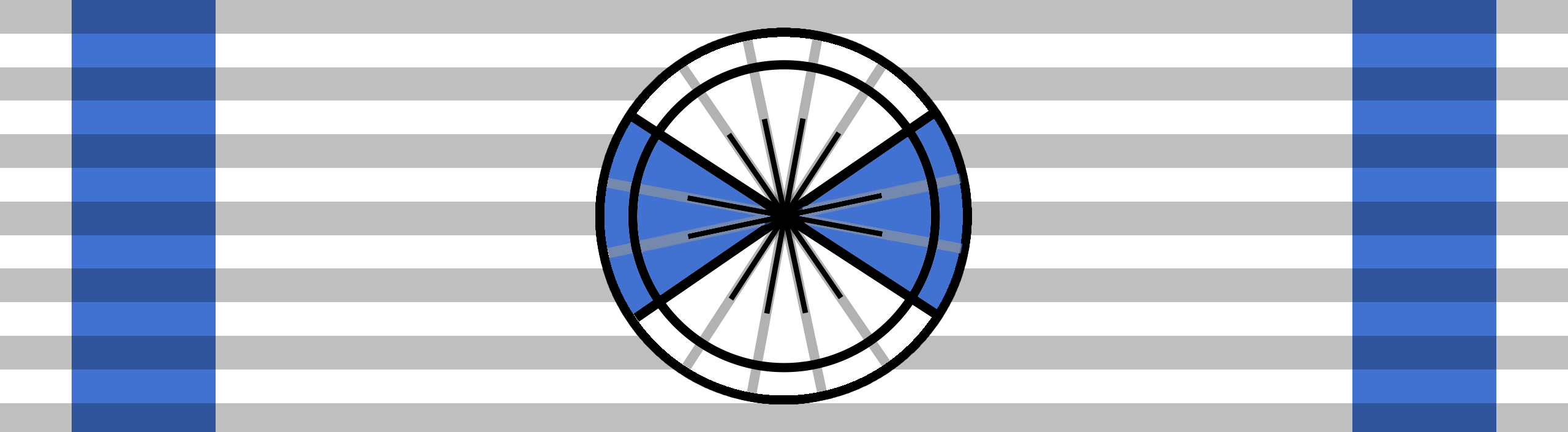

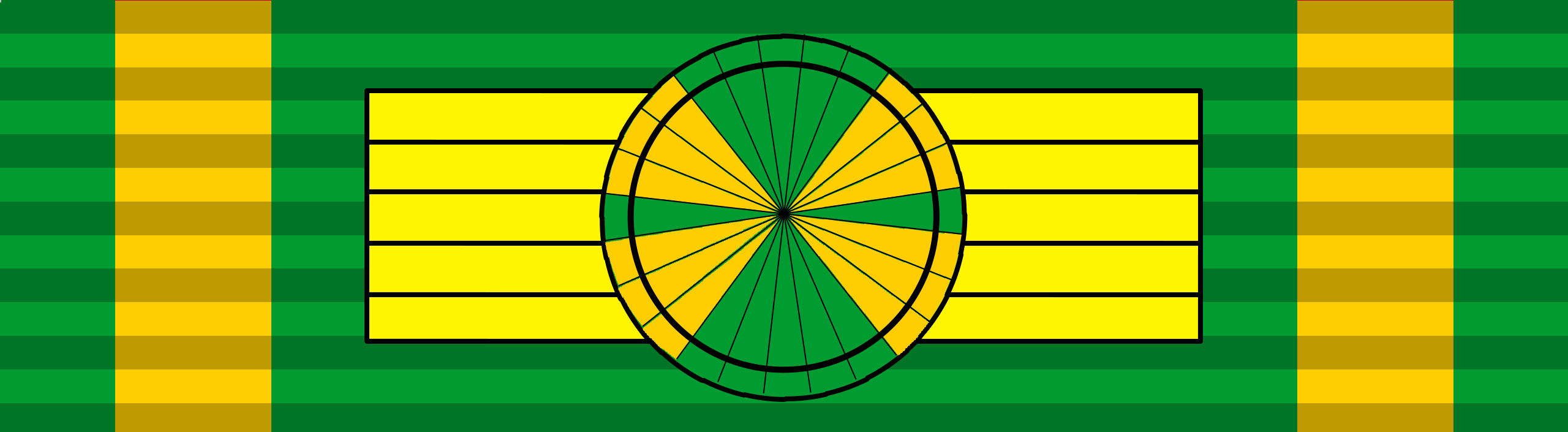

Pakistan Navy Operations Branch Badge
Command at Sea insignia
Nishan-e-Imtiaz (Military) (Order of Excellence)		Hilal-e-Imtiaz (Military) (Crescent of Excellence)	
Sitara-e-Imtiaz (Military) (Star of Excellence)	President's Award for Pride of Performance (Sailing - 1987)	Tamgha-e-Imtiaz (Military) (Medal of Excellence)	Tamgha-e-Baqa (Nuclear Test Medal) 1998
Tamgha-e-Istaqlal Pakistan (Escalation with India Medal) 2002	10 Years Service Medal	20 Years Service Medal	30 Years Service Medal
35 Years Service Medal	40 Years Service Medal	Tamgha-e-Sad Saala Jashan-e- Wiladat-e-Quaid-e-Azam (100th Birth Anniversary of Muhammad Ali Jinnah) 1976	Hijri Tamgha (Hijri Medal) 1979
Jamhuriat Tamgha (Democracy Medal) 1988	Qarardad-e-Pakistan Tamgha (Resolution Day Golden Jubilee Medal) 1990	Tamgha-e-Salgirah Pakistan (Independence Day Golden Jubilee Medal) 1997	Turkish Legion of Merit (Turkey)
CISM Medal of Merit - Officer 2016	The Legion of Merit (Degree of Commander) (USA) 2016	Order of King Abdul Aziz (1st Class) (Saudi Arabia) 2017	The Order of Military Service (Malaysia) 2017

=== Foreign Decorations ===
Foreign Awards
Turkey	The Legion of Merit Turkey
	CISM Medal of Merit - Officer
USA	The Legion of Merit (Degree of Commander)
Saudi Arabia	Order of King Abdulaziz al Saud
Malaysia	The Order of Military Service - Courageous Commander

Military offices
Preceded by ADM Asif Sandila	Chief of Naval Staff; 2 October 2014 – 6 October 2017	Succeeded by ADM Zafar Mahmood Abbasi
