= Sword of Honour (Pakistan) =

Sword of Honour اعزازی شمشیر
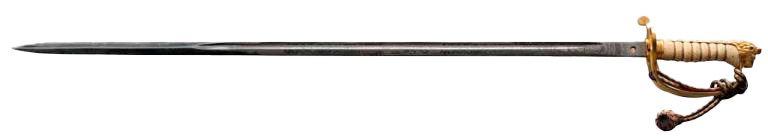
- Type: Sword
- Awarded for: Overall best performance during training period
- Location: Pakistan Military Academy, Kakul; Pakistan Air Force Academy, Risalpur; Pakistan Naval Academy, Karachi; Officers Training School, Mangla (1948-1992)
- Country: Pakistan
- Presented by: Chief guest of the passing out parade
- Eligibility: Pakistan Armed Forces officers
- First award: 4 February 1950; 76 years ago

The Sword of Honour (Note: Urdu: اعزازی شمشیر) is an award given to the top-performing Gentleman Cadet, Officer Cadet, Aviation Cadet or Lady Cadet during their training period at the Pakistan Military Academy, Pakistan Air Force Academy, Pakistan Naval Academy and the Officers Training School (until 1990). It is considered one of the highest distinctions in the Pakistan Armed Forces, as cadets aspire to win it. The sword is traditionally presented to the recipient during the passing out parade, held biannually at each academy's parade ground.

On 22 September 2006, aviation cadet Saira Amin became the first lady officer to be presented with the Sword of Honour at the passing out parade of the 117th GD Pilot Course. On 20 May 2025, Asim Munir became first Sword of Honour winner to become Field Marshal.

== Other awards ==
At PMA along with the sword of honour, other awards are also given to the best cadets.

Award name	Course Name
President Gold Medal	Long Course
CJCSC Overseas Gold Medal	Long Course (awarded to the best cadet of an allied country)
COAS's Cane	Technical Cadet Course
Commandant's Cane	Integrated Cadet Course & Lady Cadet's Course

== List of notable winners ==
Pakistan Military Academy:

1. 1st PMA Long Course: GC Raja Aziz Bhatti
2. 3rd PMA Long Course: BSUO Saadullah Khan
3. 4th PMA Long Course: BSUO Khushdil Khan Afridi
4. 6th PMA Long Course: CSUO Abdul Qayyum
5. 11th PMA Long Course: CSUO Khurshid Ali Khan
6. 13th PMA Long Course: CSUO Usman Ali Isani
7. 24th PMA Long Course: CSUO Mahmud Ali Durrani
8. 25th PMA Long Course: CSUO Fazle Qadir
9. 28th PMA Long Course: BSUO Nisar Akbar Khan
10. 29th PMA Long Course: BSUO Shabbir Sharif
11. 40th PMA Long Course: BSUO Tariq Waseem Ghazi
12. 44th PMA Long Course: BSUO Shahid Aziz
13. 51th PMA Long Course: ASUO Khalid Nawaz Khan
14. 55th PMA Long Course: BSUO Tariq Khan
15. 61st PMA Long Course: BSUO Naweed Zaman
16. 26th PMA Grad Course: CSGT Khalid Mukhtar Farani
17. 74th PMA Long Course: BUSO Azhar Saleh Abbasi
18. 80th PMA Long Course: BSUO Asim Malik
19. 82nd PMA Long Course: CSUO Muhammad Shahbaz Khan
20. 84th PMA Long Course: BSUO Omer Ahmed Bokhari
21. 86th PMA Long Course: ASUO Muhammad Raza Aizad
22. 88th PMA Long Course: BSUO Kamal Anwar Chaudhry
23. 89th PMA Long Course: CSUO Omer Naseem
24. 90th PMA Long Course: CSUO Sajid Amin Awan
25. 91th PMA Long Course: CSUO Mehr Omer Khan
26. 92th PMA Long Course: ASUO Salman
27. 93th PMA Long Course: ASUO Nauman Malik

Officers Training School:

1. 6th OTS Course: Mohammad Afsar Khan
2. 17th OTS Course: Asim Munir

Pakistan Naval Academy:

1. Muhammad Zakaullah
2. Zafar Mahmood Abbasi
3. Amjad Khan Niazi
4. Shamoon Alam Khan
5. Nassar Ikram

Pakistan Air Force Academy:

1. 5th GD(P) - Inamul Haque Khan
2. 10th GD(P) - Alauddin Ahmed
3. 23rd GD(P) - Syed Manzoor ul Hassan Hashmi
4. 30th GD(P) - Farooq Umar
5. 38th GD(P) - Pervez Mehdi Qureshi
6. 55th GD(P) - Abdul Razzaq Anjum
7. 66th GD(P) - Rizwan Ullah Khan

== Gallery ==
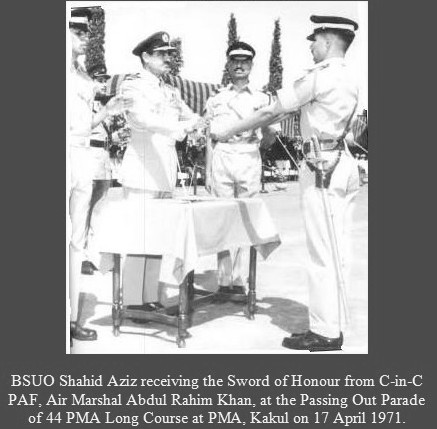
Battalion Senior Under Officer Shahid Aziz receives the sword from Air Marshal Abdur Rahim Khan, 1971

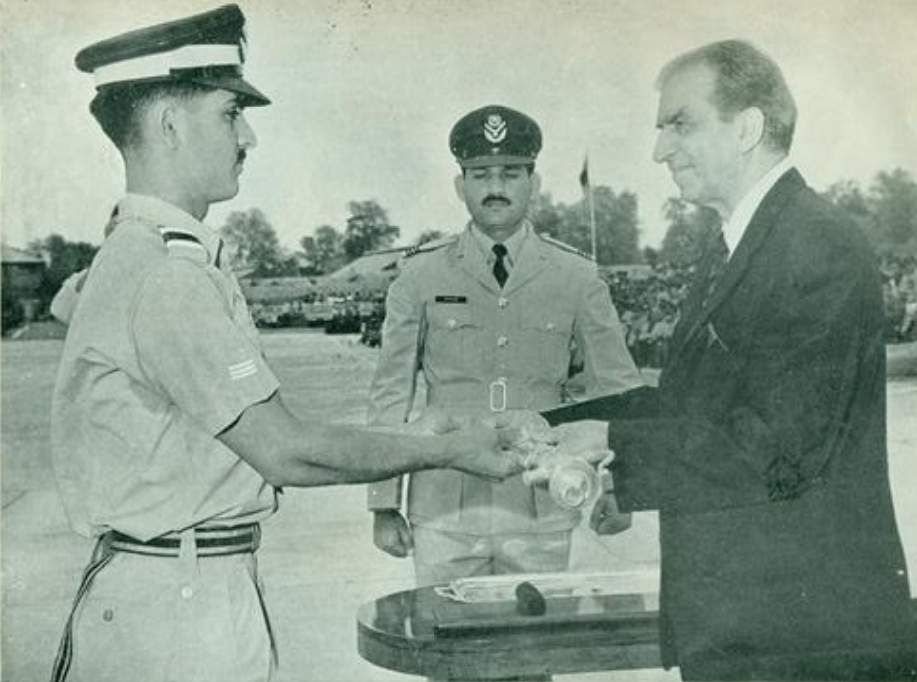
Flight Cadet Abdul Razzaq Anjum receives the sword from Aziz Ahmed, 1973.

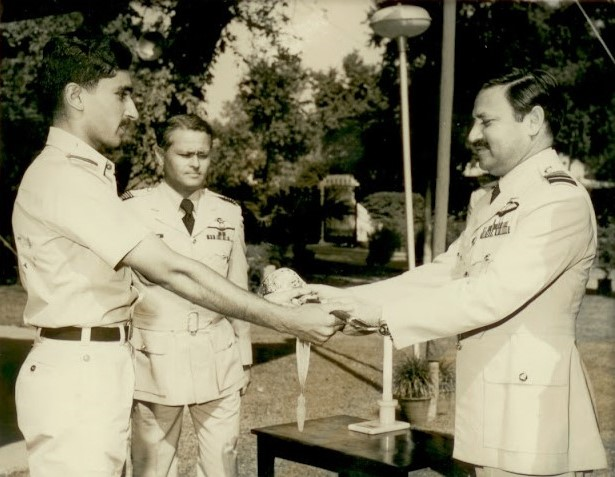
Flight Cadet Rizwan Ullah Khan receives the sword, 1976

== Notes ==
Abbreviations used:

- GD(P) - General Duty (Pilot)
- GC - Gentleman Cadet
- CSUO - Company Senior Under Officer
- BSUO - Battalion Senior Under Officer
- ASUO - Academy Senior Under Officer
