= Pakistan Educational Research Network =

Network of Interconnected universities in Pakistan

Pakistan Education & Research Network
- Abbreviation: PERN
- Formation: 2004
- Region served: Pakistan
- Affiliations: HEC; APAN
- Website: pern.edu.pk

The Pakistan Education & Research Network (PERN) is a nationwide initiative that connects leading educational institutions and research centers. It delivers high‑speed networking solutions— including internet access, managed services, and dedicated research bandwidth— to support digital libraries, video and audio conferencing, cloud computing, and campus‑wide Wi‑Fi. These capabilities underpin large‑scale projects such as the Smart University initiative, enabling enhanced collaboration, resource sharing, and academic innovation.

== See also ==
- Higher Education Commission
- Pakistan Academy of Sciences
