= Pakistan Naval Academy =

Academy of the Pakistan Navy

Coordinates: 24°48′01″N 66°58′20″E

Pakistan Naval Academy (PNA), PNS Rahbar, Manora
- Logo of the Pakistan Naval Academy
- Motto: رَّبِّ زِدْنِي عِلْمًا
- Motto in English: Oh my Lord increase my knowledge
- Type: Federal Military Academy
- Established: December 16, 1970; 55 years ago
- Affiliations: Bahria University; National University of Sciences & Technology; Pakistan Navy Engineering College; Pakistan Educational Research Network
- Commandant: Rear Admiral Muhammad Umair SI(M)
- Undergraduates: 4,451
- Location: Manora, Karachi, Sindh Province, Pakistan
- Colors: Navy Blue; White
- Website: https://www.paknavy.gov.pk/rahbar.html

The Pakistan Naval Academy (PNA), PNS Rahbar, Manora is a federal military academy located in Manora, Karachi, Sindh, Pakistan.

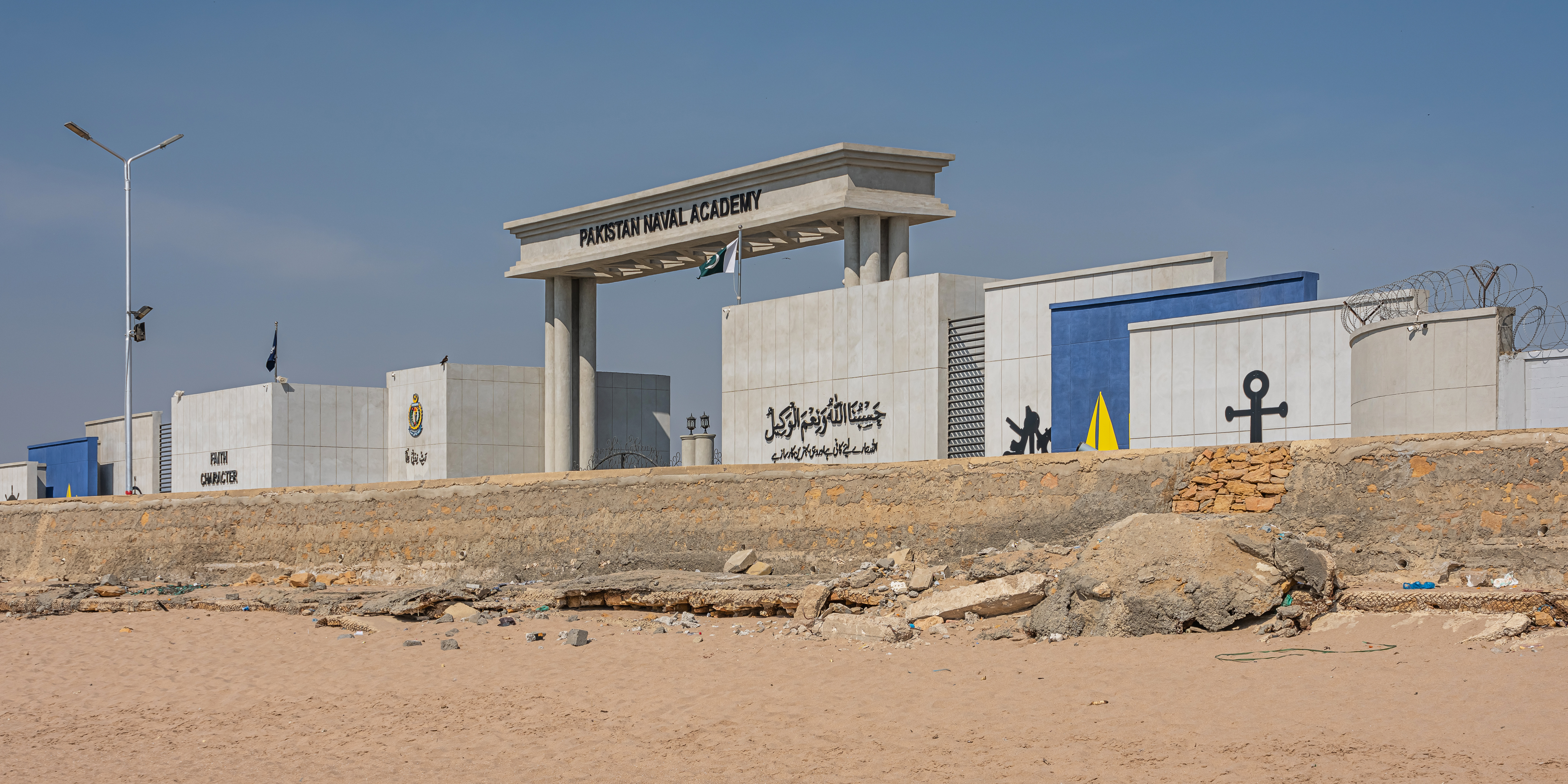
Pakistan Naval Academy Gate

Established in Manora, Karachi in 1970, it is one of the technologically advanced military training academy in Pakistan that offers professional academic degrees. Its functions and roles are similar to United States Naval Academy in Annapolis, Maryland, United States. It occasionally sends its students to United States Naval Academy for further advanced courses. Besides training its own officers, the academy has also provided basic training to about 2,000 officers of allied countries, including the Chief of Naval Staff of Qatari Emiri Navy.

== Mission of Pakistan Naval Academy ==
“To impart moral, professional, educational and physical training to the cadets that imbues them with the highest ideals of integrity, duty, courage and honour in order to establish a sound base to become a proficient naval officer.”

== Pakistan Naval Academy ISO certified ==
The Pakistan Naval Academy is "the first Armed Forces Academy in the country which has been certified to the international standards of quality (ISO-9001:2000)".

Quality policy of the Academy is:

"Pakistan Naval Academy aims to impart quality education and professional training to cadets that fulfill the requirement of Pakistan Navy. This is achieved through committed leadership, competent and devoted staff and progressive improvement in curriculum and training methodologies”."

== History ==
In 1947, after the Independence of Pakistan, the Pakistan Navy lacked the capability and expertise to train its officers. Therefore, the Pakistan Navy sent its officers to be trained at the Britannia Royal Naval College, Britain. However, due to divergent operational requirements and cultural values, Pakistan was compelled to start its own training institute for its navy. In 1961, the cruiser PNS Babur was converted into Cadets Training Ship. After the outbreak of the 1965 Indo-Pak War, PNS Babur was made available for operational requirements. There was now a need for a permanent institution for training navy officers. On 16 December 1970, Pakistan Naval Academy was commissioned as PNS Rahbar at Manora.

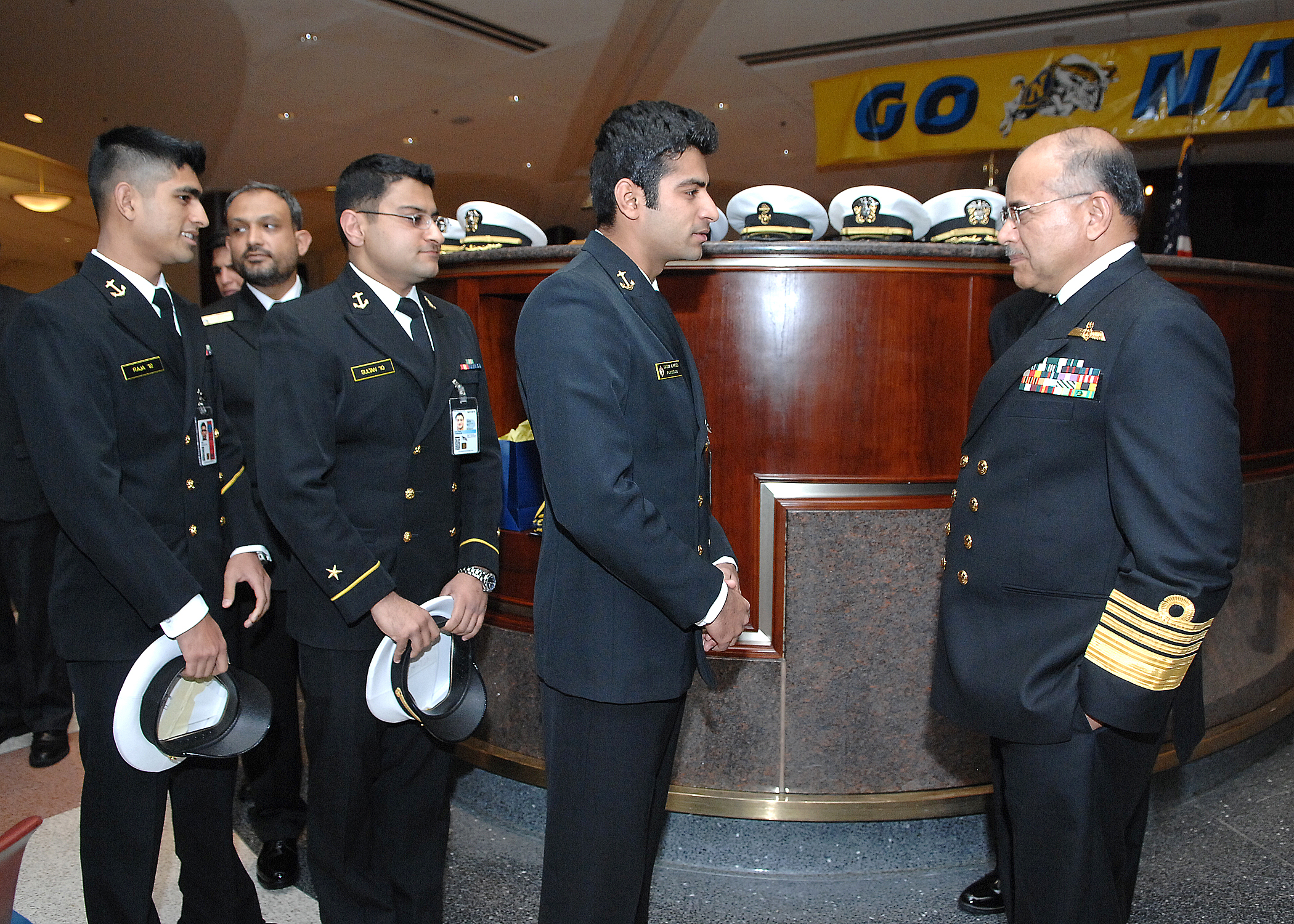
Chief of Naval Staff Admiral Noman Bashir meets with Pakistani Naval Academy students while visiting the U.S. Naval Academy.

== Location and strategic significance ==
It is situated on Manora Island, just south of Karachi Harbour, covering an area of approximately 2.5 square kilometers. The location provides both the tactical advantage of proximity to the Arabian Sea and an immersive maritime environment for the cadets. Architecturally, the academy spans 20 buildings, includes two jetties, and expertly integrates with the island’s scenic and historical landscape.

== Training ==
Cadets begin training by starting a year and half at the academy. They are initially taught three different disciplines:

- Humanities
- Professional
- Engineering

Along with this they are also taught academic, professional and technical subjects.

After passing out they are appointed to midshipmen. In this phase, they go through another six months of training at sea. They are assigned to one of the four different branches including Operations, Weapon Engineering, Mechanical Engineering and Logistics. After passing the final fleet examination, they are promoted to Sub-Lieutenant.

Outdoor pool at the academy.

== Affiliations ==
The academy is also affiliated with the following educational institutions:

- Bahria University
- National University of Sciences & Technology
- Pakistan Navy Engineering College
- Pakistan Educational Research Network

== See also ==
- Military academies in Pakistan
- Pakistan Naval War College
- Pakistan Marine Academy
- Sword of Honour (Pakistan)
