= Chief of the Naval Staff (Pakistan) =

Officer in the Pakistani Navy

- رئیسِ عملۂ پاک بحریہ
- Flag of the Chief of the Naval Staff

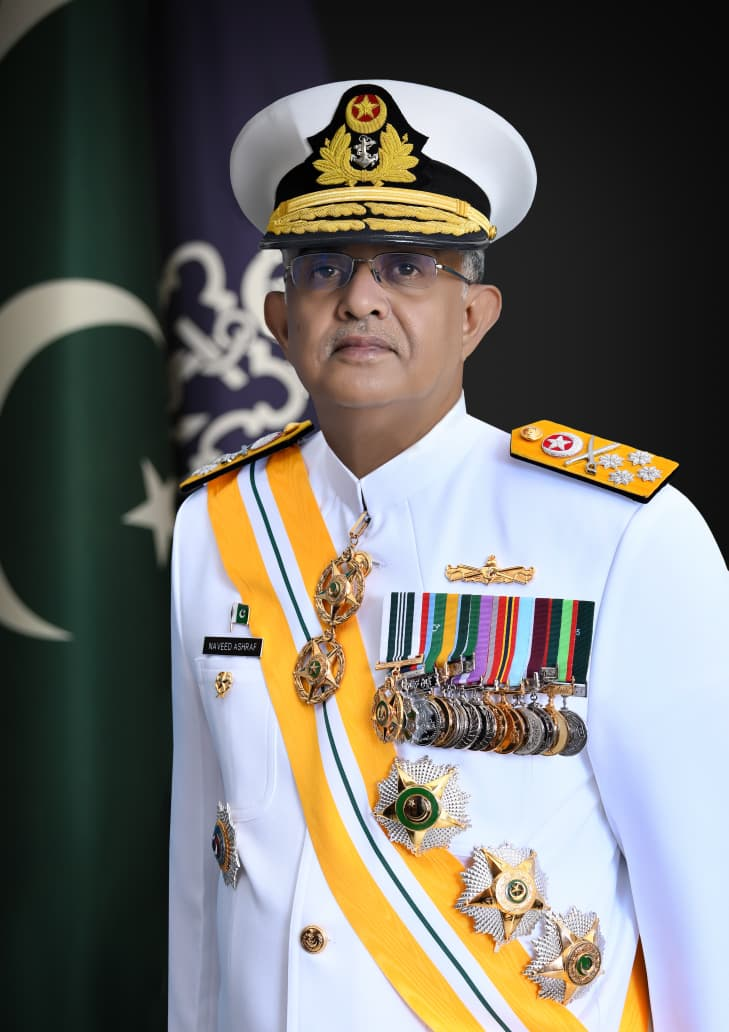
- Incumbent; Admiral Naveed Ashraf since 7 October 2023
- Ministry of Defence; Navy Secretariat-III at MoD
- Abbreviation: CNS
- Member of: National Security Council
- Reports to: Prime Minister of Pakistan; Minister of Defence
- Seat: Naval Headquarters (NHQ); Islamabad, Pakistan
- Nominator: Prime Minister of Pakistan
- Appointer: President of Pakistan
- Term length: 5 years renewable irrespective of age
- Precursor: Flag Officer Commanding (1947-1950); Commander-in-Chief (1950-1972)
- Formation: 3 March 1972; 54 years ago
- First holder: Vice Admiral Hasan Hafeez Ahmed
- Succession: On basis of seniority, subjected to the decision of the Prime Minister of Pakistan.
- Unofficial names: Naval chief
- Deputy: Vice Chief of the Naval Staff
- Website: Official website

The Chief of the Naval Staff (Note: Urdu: رئیسِ عملۂ پاک بحریہ, romanised: Rais amlah pak bahriyah) (reporting name: CNS) is a military appointment and a statutory office held by a four-star rank admiral in the Pakistan Navy, who is nominated and appointed by the Prime Minister of Pakistan and confirmed by the President of Pakistan.

The Chief of Naval Staff is one of the senior-most appointments in the Pakistan Armed Forces who is one of the senior members of the Joint Chiefs of Staff Committee in a separate capacity, providing senior consultation to the Chairman Joint Chiefs of Staff Committee to act as a principal military advisor to the Prime Minister of Pakistan and its Government of Pakistan in the line of defending and safeguarding the expedition, maritime and sealine borders of the nation.

The Chief of Naval Staff exercise its responsibility of command and control of the operational, combatant, logistics, administration, and training commands within the Pakistan Navy, in a clear contrast to the U.S. Navy's Chief of Naval Operations (CNO). Due to its responsibility and importance, the Chief of Naval Staff plays a critical role in assessing the coastal defense and conducting reconnaissance to insure its strike capability against aggressive forces.

In principle, the appointment is constitutionally subjected for three years but extensions may be granted by the President upon recommendations and approvals from the Prime Minister. The Chief of Naval Staff is based on the Navy NHQ, and the current Chief of Naval Staff is Admiral Naveed Ashraf, who took over the command as chief of naval staff on 7 October 2023.

== History ==
The original post commanding the Pakistan Navy was knowns as the Commander-in-Chief which was created on 30 March 1950. On 20 March 1972, it was renamed Chief of Naval Staff (CNS) with Vice-Admiral Hasan Hafeez Ahmed becoming the first chief, though his rank was not elevated to four-star rank.

The term of the superannuation was then constrained to three years in the office as opposed to four years and was made a permanent member of Joint Chiefs of Staff Committee. Since 1972, there have been 14 four-star rank admirals appointed as chiefs of naval staff by statute. The Prime Minister, with the President's confirmation, approved the nomination and appointment of the Chief of Naval Staff.

The leadership of the navy is based in the Navy NHQ located in the vicinity of Air AHQ, and Army GHQ staff offices that form that JS HQ in the Rawalpindi District, Punjab, Pakistan. The CNS controls the navy, assisted by the civilians from the Navy Secretariat-III of the Ministry of Defense (MoD).

The Chief of Naval Staff exercises its responsibility of completing operational, training and logistics commands. The CNS has several principal staff officers and controls the navy through seven principle staff commands directed by its appointed Deputy Chiefs of Naval Staff.

- DCNS Operations
- DCNS Supply
- DCNS Training and Personnel
- DCNS Projects
- DCNS Materials
- DCNS Administration
- DCNS Welfare and Housing

== List of Commanders ==
The following is a list of Admirals who have served as either Flag Officer Commanding, Commander-in-Chief, and the Chief of the Naval Staff of the Pakistan Navy.

=== Flag Officer Commanding ===
No.	Portrait	Flag Officer Commanding	Took office	Left office	Time in office	Defence branch
1	James Wilfred JeffordCB CBE	Rear Admiral; James Wilfred Jefford; CB CBE (1901–1980)	15 August 1947	30 March 1953	2 years, 227 days	Royal Navy

=== Commander-in-Chief ===
On 30 March 1950, the position was re-designated as Commander-in-Chief of the Royal Pakistan Navy.

No.	Portrait	Commander-in-Chief	Took office	Left office	Time in office	Defence branch
1	James Wilfred JeffordCB CBE	Rear Admiral; James Wilfred Jefford; CB CBE (1901–1980)	30 March 1950	30 January 1953	2 years, 306 days	Royal Navy
2	HMS Choudri HPk MBE	Vice Admiral; HMS Choudri HPk MBE (1912–2004)	31 January 1953	28 February 1959	6 years, 28 days	Pakistan Navy
3	A. R. KhanHPk HJ HQA	Vice Admiral; A. R. Khan; HPk HJ HQA (1921–1983)	1 March 1959	20 October 1966	7 years, 233 days	Pakistan Navy
4	S. M. AhsanSQA SPk DSC	Vice Admiral; S. M. Ahsan; SQA SPk DSC (1920–1989)	20 October 1966	31 August 1969	2 years, 315 days	Pakistan Navy
5	Muzaffar HassanSK	Vice Admiral; Muzaffar Hassan; SK (1921–2012)	1 September 1969	22 December 1971	2 years, 112 days	Pakistan Navy

=== Chiefs of the Naval Staff (CNS) of Pakistan Navy ===
No.	Portrait	Chief of Naval Staff	Took office	Left office	Time in office
1	Hasan Hafeez Ahmed TQA	Vice admiral Hasan Hafeez Ahmed TQA (1926–1975)	3 March 1972	8 March 1975 †	3 years, 5 days
2	Mohammad Shariff NI(M), HI(M), SI(M), HJ, SJ, SK	Admiral; Mohammad Shariff NI(M), HI(M), SI(M), HJ, SJ, SK (1920–2020)	23 March 1975	21 March 1979	3 years, 363 days
3	Karamat Rahman Niazi NI(M), HI(M), SJ	Admiral; Karamat Rahman Niazi NI(M), HI(M), SJ (1930–2021)	22 March 1979	23 March 1983	4 years, 1 day
4	Tariq Kamal Khan NI(M), SI(M), SBt	Admiral; Tariq Kamal Khan NI(M), SI(M), SBt (1930–2008)	23 March 1983	9 April 1986	3 years, 17 days
5	Iftikhar Ahmed Sirohey NI(M), HI(M), SI(M), SBt	Admiral; Iftikhar Ahmed Sirohey NI(M), HI(M), SI(M), SBt (1934–2025)	9 April 1986	9 November 1988	2 years, 214 days
6	Yastur-ul-Haq Malik NI(M), SBt	Admiral; Yastur-ul-Haq Malik NI(M), SBt (1931–2024)	10 November 1988	8 November 1991	2 years, 363 days
7	Saeed Mohammad Khan NI(M), SBt	Admiral; Saeed Mohammad Khan NI(M), SBt (1935–2022)	9 November 1991	9 November 1994	3 years
8	Mansurul Haq NI(M)	Admiral; Mansurul Haq NI(M) (1937–2018)	10 November 1994	1 May 1997	2 years, 173 days
9	Fasih Bokhari NI(M), HI(M), SI(M), SBt, SJ	Admiral; Fasih Bokhari NI(M), HI(M), SI(M), SBt, SJ (1942–2020)	2 May 1997	2 October 1999	2 years, 153 days
10	Abdul Aziz Mirza NI(M), HI(M), SI(M), SBt	Admiral; Abdul Aziz Mirza NI(M), HI(M), SI(M), SBt (born 1943)	2 October 1999	2 October 2002	3 years
11	Shahid Karimullah NI(M), HI(M), SI(M), TI(M), SJ	Admiral; Shahid Karimullah NI(M), HI(M), SI(M), TI(M), SJ (born 1948)	3 October 2002	6 October 2005	3 years, 4 days
12	Afzal Tahir NI(M), HI(M), SI(M)	Admiral; Afzal Tahir NI(M), HI(M), SI(M) (born 1949)	7 October 2005	7 October 2008	3 years
13	Noman Bashir NI(M), HI(M), SI(M), TI(M)	Admiral; Noman Bashir NI(M), HI(M), SI(M), TI(M)	7 October 2008	7 October 2011	3 years
14	Asif Sandila NI(M), HI(M)	Admiral; Asif Sandila NI(M), HI(M) (born 1954)	8 October 2011	3 October 2014	2 years, 360 days
15	Muhammad Zakaullah NI(M), HI(M), SI(M), TI(M)	Admiral; Muhammad Zakaullah NI(M), HI(M), SI(M), TI(M) (born 1958)	4 October 2014	6 October 2017	3 years, 2 days
16	Zafar Mahmood Abbasi HI(M), SI(M)	Admiral; Zafar Mahmood Abbasi HI(M), SI(M)	7 October 2017	7 October 2020	3 years
17	Amjad Khan Niazi NI(M), HI(M), SI(M)	Admiral; Amjad Khan Niazi NI(M), HI(M), SI(M)	7 October 2020	7 October 2023	3 years
18	Naveed Ashraf	Admiral; Naveed Ashraf	7 October 2023	Incumbent	2 years, 335 days

== See also ==
- Pakistan Navy
- Vice Chief of the Naval Staff (Pakistan)
- List of Pakistan Navy admirals
- Chairman Joint Chiefs of Staff Committee (Pakistan)
- Chief of the Army Staff (Pakistan)
- Chief of the Air Staff (Pakistan)
- Chief of the General Staff (Pakistan)
