= Admiral (Pakistan) =

Highest rank in Pakistan navy

- Flag of admiral in Pakistan Navy

- Shoulder and sleeve insignia.
- Country: Pakistan
- Service branch: Pakistan Navy; Pakistan Marines; Inter-Services Public Relations
- Abbreviation: ADM
- Rank: Four-star
- Next higher rank: Fleet Admiral (never-bestowed)
- Next lower rank: Vice Admiral
- Equivalent ranks: General (Pakistan Army); Air chief marshal (Pakistan Air Force)

Admiral (abbreviated as ADM) is a four-star commissioned senior most flag officer rank in the Pakistan Navy, and marines bestowed by the Islamic Republic of Pakistan. It is the highest rank in Pakistan armed services, above the three-star vice admiral. Admiral is equivalent to the rank of general in the Pakistan Army and air chief marshal in the Pakistan Air Force. Admiral is the only rank in Pakistan that holds the chief of naval staff office. The four-star Admiral commands the task allocations of the entire Pakistan Navy in an organisational structure aided by various statutory authorities such as Deputy Chiefs of the Naval Staff (Branch Commanders), Naval Secretary, hydrographer, Quartermaster general, engineer-in-chief, flag officer sea training, chief of naval logistics, and director-general of training and joint warfare.

Sometimes, an admiral may be called a full-admiral or a four-star admiral to distinguish the rank from other insignias such as three-star vice admiral, two-star rear admiral, fleet admiral or just "Admiral".

== Appointment and retirement ==
The appointment of admiral is made by the President of Pakistan, however appointment and reappointment advice is done by the prime minister. Since country is governed by the Parliament of Pakistan as amended in constitution, the President plays a signatory-role in armed forces who exercises the power of the commander-in-chief in the country and determines the tenure of admiral in a joint effort with country's prime minister.

The retirement or service extension are governed by the constitution, however it is exercised by the president under certain rules and regulations. The maximum age is set to 64, however it may not be applicable in times of state of emergency and crises such as ongoing armed conflict or any other situation that affects the national interest.

== Statutory limits ==
Because of the vast array of armed roles and responsibilities, coupled with a conspicuous presence on the national scene, the law of Pakistan restricts the unsanctioned use of power by a four-star admiral and can be constraint under a certain constitutional amendment. An admiral can be explicitly removed by the Supreme Court of Pakistan over corruption charges or any other illegal activity involving national security.

== See also ==
- List of serving admirals of the Pakistan Navy
