= Raja Rab Nawaz =

Pakistan Navy vice admiral

Vice Admiral Raja Rab Nawaz HI(M) SI(M) SBt
- Alma mater: Pakistan Naval Academy; National Defence University; Naval Postgraduate School; Pakistan Navy War College
- Military career
- Allegiance: Pakistan
- Branch: Pakistan Navy
- Service years: 1987-present
- Rank: Vice Admiral
- Commands: Commander Coast (COMCOAST); Commander West (COMWEST); Flag Officer Sea Training (FOST); PNS ZULFIQUAR
- Awards: Hilal-e-Imtiaz (Military); Sitara-e-Imtiaz (Military); Sitara-e-Basalat

Raja Rab Nawaz HI(M) SI(M) SBt is a vice admiral of Pakistan Navy, presently serving as the Chief of Staff at Naval Headquarters.

== Education ==
The Admiral is an alumnus of the Pakistan Navy War College, Lahore and National Defence University, Islamabad. Furthermore, he holds a master's degree in Security Studies from the Naval Postgraduate School, Monterey, California, United States.

== Career ==
Commissioned into the Operations Branch of the Pakistan Navy in 1991, Rab Nawaz has built a distinguished career marked by extensive experience in various Command and Staff appointments. His command roles include serving as the Commanding Officer of PNS ZULFIQUAR, Commander West, and Flag Officer Sea Training. Additionally, he has held staff positions such as Fleet Operations Officer to Commander Pakistan Fleet, Director of Operational Research, Director Naval Operational Plans, Assistant Chief of Naval Staff (Plans), Chief Staff Officer to Commander Pakistan Fleet, Deputy Chief of Naval Staff (Welfare & Housing) and Commander Coast (COMCOAST). Rab Nawaz has also represented Pakistan as the Defence and Naval Advisor in the United Kingdom.

== Awards and decorations ==
In acknowledgment of his meritorious services, Vice Admiral Rab Nawaz has been honored with the Hilal-e-Imtiaz (Military) and the Sitara-e-Imtiaz (Military). He was awarded the Sitara-e-Basalat following his contributions in the 2025 India–Pakistan conflict.

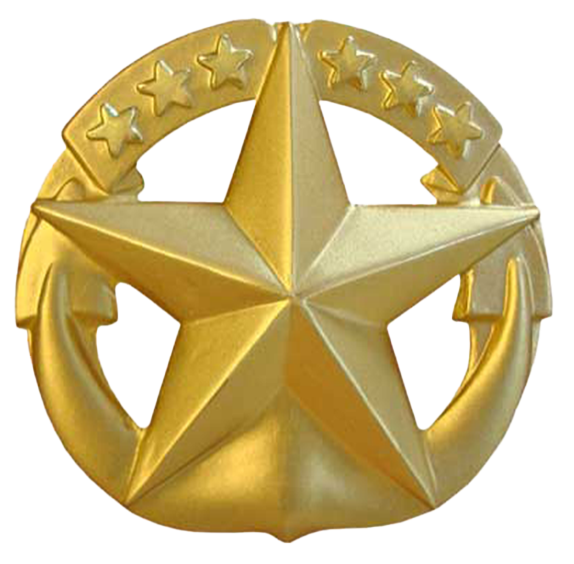

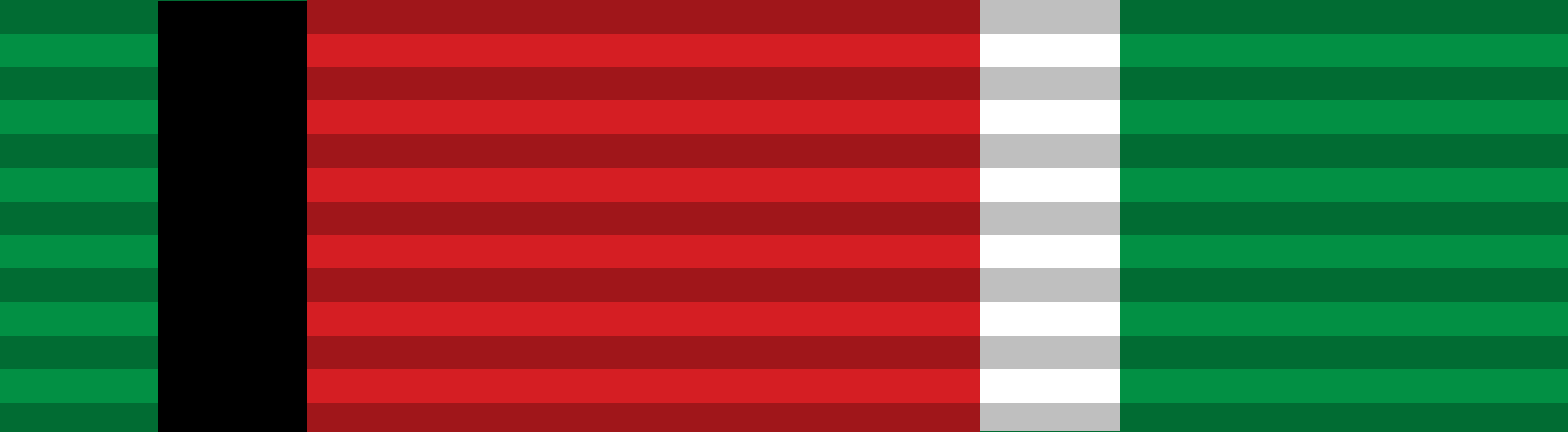

Pakistan Navy Operations Branch Badge
Command at Sea insignia
Hilal-e-Imtiaz (Military) (Crescent of Excellence)	Sitara-e-Imtiaz (Military) (Star of Excellence)	Sitara-e-Basalat	Tamgha-e-Baqa (Nuclear Test Medal) 1998
Tamgha-e-Istaqlal Pakistan (Escalation with India Medal) 2002	Tamgha-e-Azm (Medal of Conviction) (2018)	10 Years Service Medal	20 Years Service Medal
30 Years Service Medal	Jamhuriat Tamgha (Democracy Medal) 1988	Qarardad-e-Pakistan Tamgha (Resolution Day Golden Jubilee Medal) 1990	Tamgha-e-Salgirah Pakistan (Independence Day Golden Jubilee Medal) 1997
