= Abdul Munib =

Pakistani military person

- Military career
- Allegiance: Pakistan
- Branch: Pakistan Navy
- Service years: 1992 – present
- Rank: Vice Admiral
- Commands: PNS Akram; PNS Alamgir; 25th Destroyer Squadron; Pakistan Fleet
- Conflicts: 2025 India–Pakistan conflict
- Awards: See list

Abdul Munib is a three star admiral of Pakistan Navy, who is presently serving as Commander, Pakistan Fleet.

== Education ==
Munir attended Pakistan Naval Academy, Pakistan Navy War College, National Defence University and completed Naval Command Course from USA.

== Military career ==
Munib was commissioned in the navy in operations branch in 1992. Throughout his career, he commanded PNS Almgir, PNS Akram, PNS Aatish and Larkana. He also served as commander of 25th Destroyer Squadron, Surface Task Group-2 and Combined Task Force-151. As a staff officer, he served as Director Naval Operational Plans, Assistant Chief of Naval Staff (Operational Plans), Assistant Chief of Naval Staff (Operations) and Deputy Naval Secretary. As a two star admiral, he served as the Naval Secretary of Pakistan Navy.

He also server as DG Naval Intelligence and DG C4I. Later he assumed the command of Pakistan Fleet in late 2024. In 2026, his rank was elevated to vice admiral while his tenure as COMPAK.

== Awards and decorations ==
For his service, Munib was awarded the Sitara-i-Imtiaz (military), Sitara-e-Basalat and Hilal-i-Imtiaz (military) by the Government of Pakistan.
