= Faisal Abbasi =

Pakistan Navy vice admiral

Faisal Abbasi HI(M) SI(M)
- فیصل عباسی
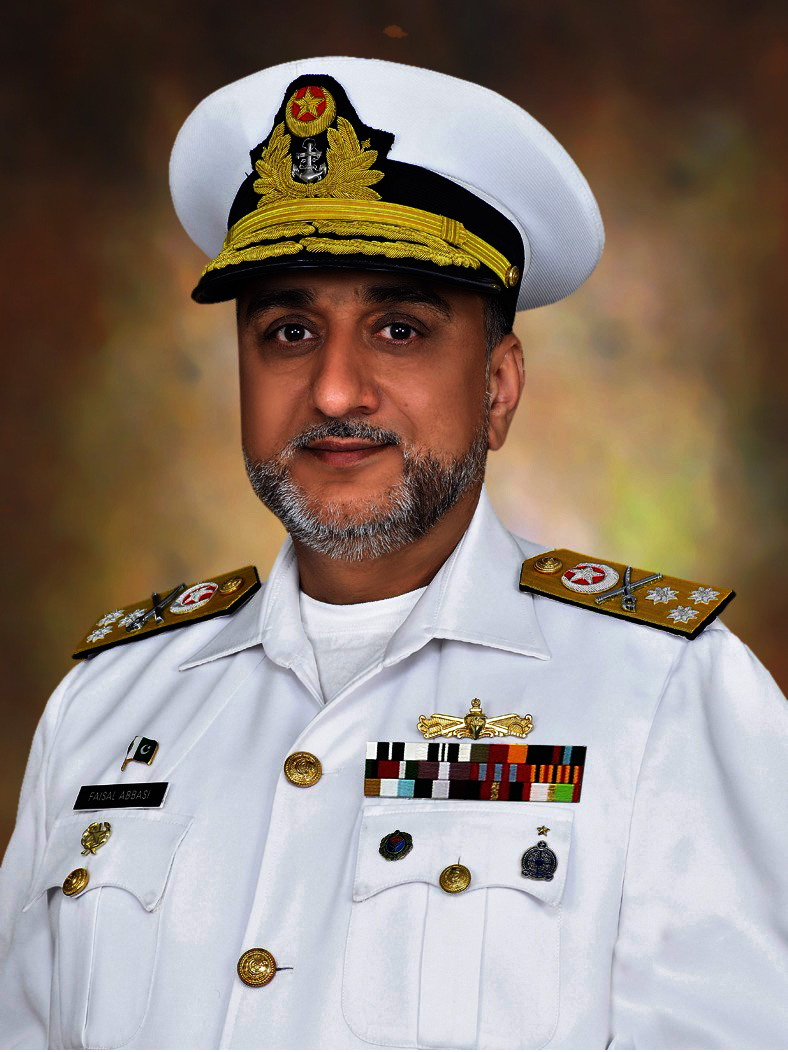

Commander Karachi
- Incumbent
- Assumed office 12 October 2024
- Preceded by: Vice Admiral Muhammad Saleem

Personal details
- Education: Pakistan Naval Academy; National Defence University; Pakistan Navy War College; U.S. Naval War College
- Awards: Hilal-e-Imtiaz (Military); Sitara-e-Imtiaz (Military)

Military service
- Allegiance: Pakistan
- Branch/service: Pakistan Navy
- Years of service: 1987-2026
- Rank: Vice Admiral
- Commands: Commander Karachi (COMKAR); Commander Pakistan Fleet (COMPAK); Flag Officer Sea Training; Commander 25th Destroyer Squadron (COMDESRON-25); PNS KHAIBAR; PNS MUNSIF

Syed Muhammad Faisal Abbasi is a vice admiral of the Pakistan Navy, presently serving as commander Karachi (COMKAR).

== Education ==
Faisal is an alumnus of the Pakistan Navy War College, Lahore, the Naval War College at Naval Station Newport in Newport, Rhode Island, USA, and the National Defence University, Islamabad.

== Career ==
Commissioned into the Operations Branch of the Pakistan Navy in 1991, Vice Admiral Abbasi has cultivated a distinguished career marked by extensive experience in various Command and Staff appointments. His significant command roles include serving as the Commanding Officer of PNS MUNSIF, PNS KHAIBAR, Commander of the 25th Destroyer Squadron, Flag Officer Sea Training and Commander Pakistan Fleet (COMPAK). Additionally, he has held important staff positions, including Senior Staff Officer (Operations) to Commander 18th Destroyer Squadron, Director Naval Operations, Directing Staff at the National Defence University, Assistant Chief of the Naval Staff (Operations), Director General Naval Intelligence, and Deputy Chief of Naval Staff (Operations).

== Awards and decorations ==
In acknowledgment of his meritorious services, Vice Admiral Muhammad Faisal Abbasi has been honored with the Hilal-e-Imtiaz (Military) and the Sitara-e-Imtiaz (Military).

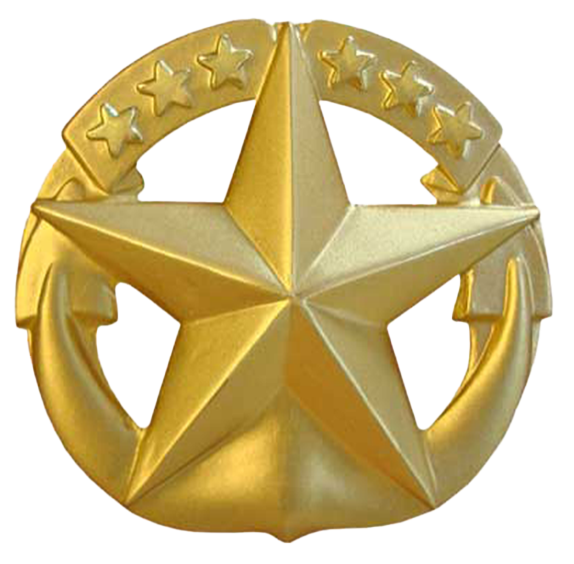

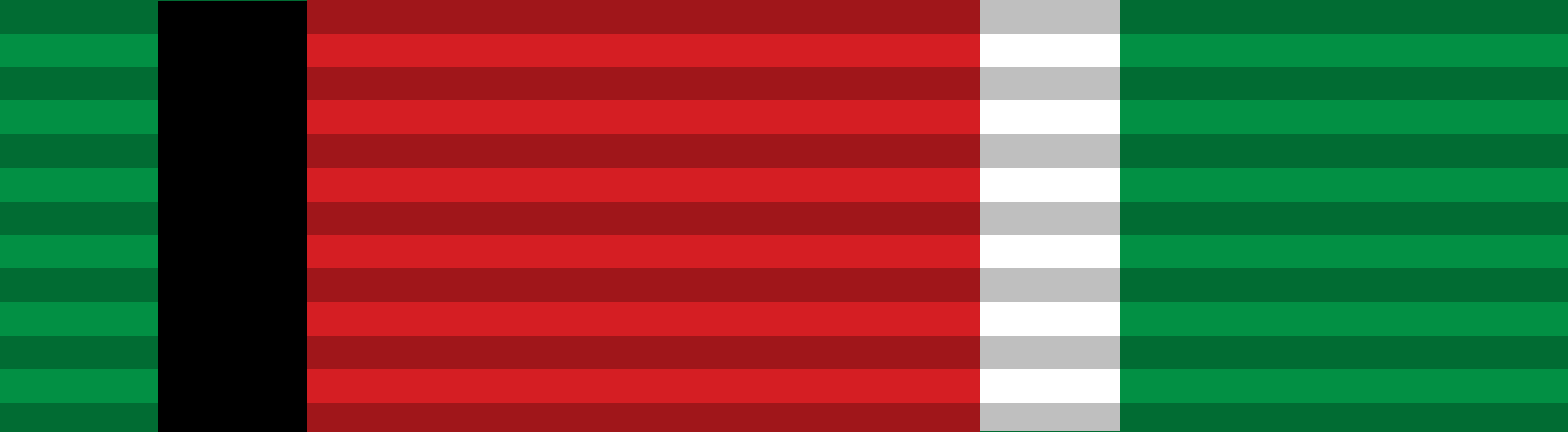

Pakistan Navy Operations Branch Badge
Command at Sea insignia
Hilal-e-Imtiaz (Military) (Crescent of Excellence)	Sitara-e-Imtiaz (Military) (Star of Excellence)	Tamgha-e-Baqa (Nuclear Test Medal) 1998		Tamgha-e-Istaqlal Pakistan (Escalation with India Medal) 2002
Tamgha-e-Azm (Medal of Conviction) (2018)	10 Years Service Medal	20 Years Service Medal	30 Years Service Medal	
35 Years Service Medal	Jamhuriat Tamgha (Democracy Medal) 1988	Qarardad-e-Pakistan Tamgha (Resolution Day Golden Jubilee Medal) 1990	Tamgha-e-Salgirah Pakistan (Independence Day Golden Jubilee Medal) 1997	
