= Faisal Amin =

Pakistani Military Person

- Allegiance: Pakistan
- Branch: Pakistan Navy
- Service years: 1992 – present
- Rank: Vice Admiral
- Commands: PNS Alamgir; 18th Destroyer Squadron; Coastal Command
- Conflicts: 2025 India–Pakistan conflict
- Awards: See list

Faisal Amin is a three star admiral in the Pakistan Navy, currently serving as the Commander Coastal Command.

== Education ==
Amin is an alumnus of Pakistan Naval Academy, Command and Staff College Quetta, National Defence University and the Royal College of Defence Studies.

== Military career ==
Being commissioned in the operations branch in 1992, he commanded two PN ships, including PNS Alamgir. He also served as commander of the 18th Destroyer Squadron and Surface Task Group-1. He served at Naval Headquarters (Pakistan) as well, holding various staff appointments such as Director Naval Operations, Director Naval Developmental Plans (Platform), Principal Secretary to the Chief of the Naval Staff, Naval Secretary at NHQ and Assistant Chief of the Naval Staff (Operations). He performed his duties at United Arab Emirates Naval College as an instructor. He also served at Defence Ministry as Additional Secretary.

His rank was elevated to three star while his tenure as Commander Coastal Command.

== Awards and decorations ==
Amin has received Sitara-i-Imtiaz (military) and Hilal-i-Imtiaz (military) for his service in the navy. He was further awarded Sitara-e-Basalat for his contributions in the 2025 India–Pakistan conflict.
