= Naveed Ashraf =

Pakistan Navy admiral

Chief of the Naval Staff Naveed Ashraf NI NI(M) T Bt
- نوید اشرف
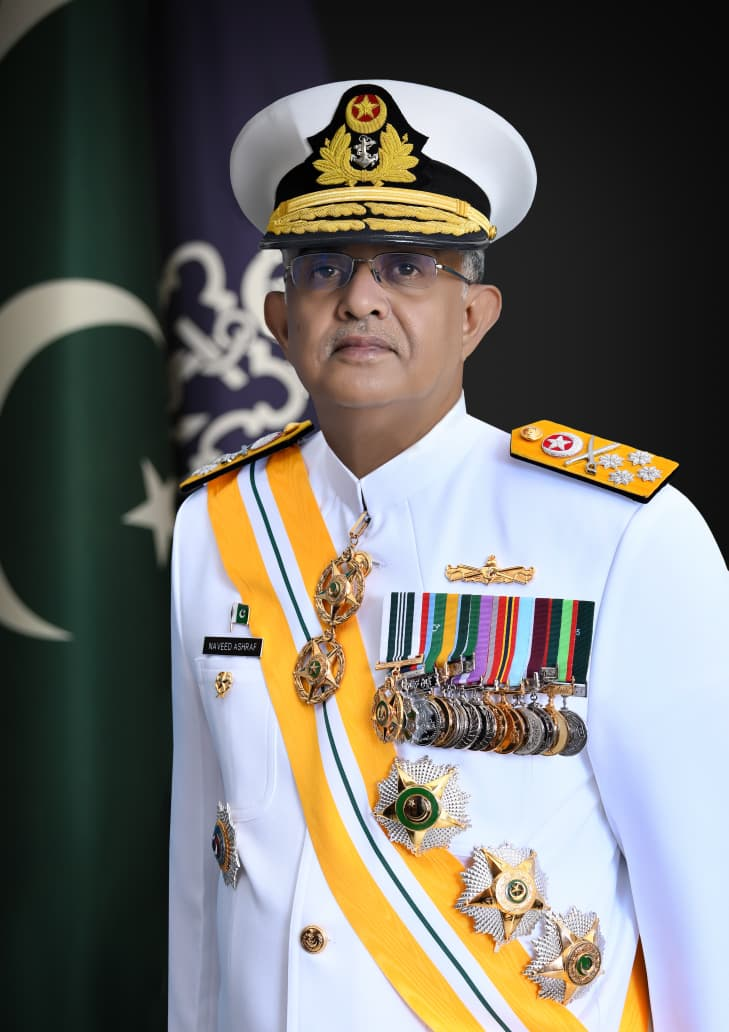
- Admiral Naveed Ashraf, Pakistan's Naval Chief
- Born: Sialkot, Pakistan
- Education: National Defence University PN War College Naval Staff College Royal College of Defence Studies
- Military career
- Allegiance: Pakistan
- Branch: Pakistan Navy
- Service years: 1986 – present
- Rank: Admiral
- Commands: Commander, Pakistan Fleet (COMPAK); Pakistan Naval Academy; PNS Alamgir; PNS Shah Jahan; PNS Tippu Sultan
- Conflicts: 2025 India-Pakistan conflict
- Awards: See list
- Website: https://www.paknavy.gov.pk/leaders

Admiral Naveed Ashraf NI NI(M) T Bt is a four-star admiral in the Pakistan Navy who has been serving as the 23rd Chief of the Naval Staff (CNS) since October 2023. Ashraf has served on various Command and Staff appointments.

His leadership has focused on technological advancement and fleet modernization of the Pakistan Navy. In 2026, he oversaw the successful acquisition of the Hangor-class submarines, a jointly built class of submarines manufactured by China and Pakistan.

In 2025, Ashraf conducted the auspicious and highly successful AMAN 2025, a naval exercise in which the navies of more than 60 countries participated, setting an unprecedented record for the Pakistan Navy at the time.

== Early life and education ==
Born in Sialkot, Pakistan, the Admiral is an alumnus of the Pakistan Naval War College, the National Defence University and the Naval War College, US. He has also obtained his military education from the Royal College of Defence Studies, UK.

== Military Career ==
Ashraf was commissioned in the Pakistan Navy with his first appointment in 1989 in the Operations Branch. He was awarded the Quaid-e-Azam Gold Medal on the successful completion of initial naval training in Germany and Pakistan. His command assignments include 18th and 25th Destroyer Squadrons, commandant Pakistan Naval Academy, additionally serving as the Commanding Officer of PNS ALAMGIR, PNS SHAHJAHAN, PNS TIPPU SULTAN, PNS MUJAHID and PNS LARKANA.

As a Rear Admiral, he was serving as Commander Pakistan Fleet.

He was appointed Fleet Operations Officer to Commander Pakistan Fleet, Chief of Staff for Combined Task Force 151 at the United States Naval Forces Central Command, Chief Instructor and Deputy President of the National Defence University, and Captain Training at the Flag Officer Sea Training (FOST),

As a Rear Admiral, he was serving as Commander Pakistan Fleet.

Prior to becoming Chief, he has served as Deputy Chief of Naval Staff (Admin), Director General C4I, Deputy Chief of Naval Staff (Training & Personnel), Deputy Chief of Naval Staff (Operations), Chief of Staff, and the Vice Chief of Naval Staff. Since October 2023, the Admiral has been serving as the Chief of Naval Staff, succeeding Admiral Amjad Khan Niazi.

Naveed Ashraf served as the chief guest of the Passing out ceremonies of the Pakistan Military Academy (PMA) and Pakistan Air Force Academy, Risalpur (PAFA) held in 2023 and 2026 respectively.

== Awards and decorations ==
In acknowledgment of his meritorious services, Admiral Naveed Ashraf has been honored with the Nishan-e-Imtiaz (Military), Hilal-e-Imtiaz (Military), Sitara-e-Imtiaz (Military), Tamgha-e-Imtiaz (Military) and Tamgha-e-Basalat. He was later awarded the Nishan-e-Imtiaz (Civilian) following the 2025 India–Pakistan conflict.

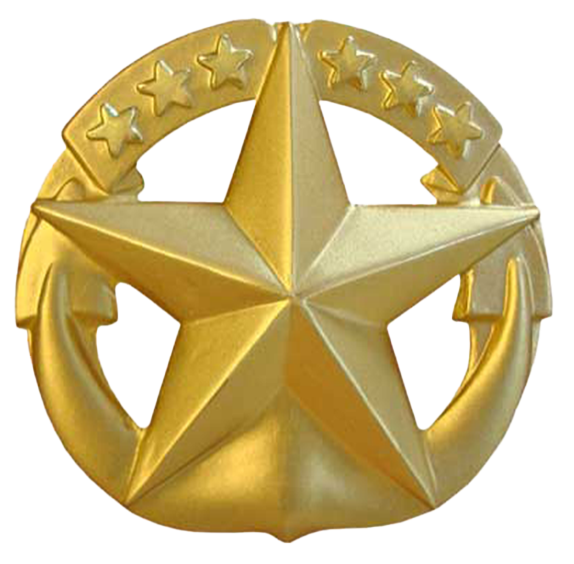

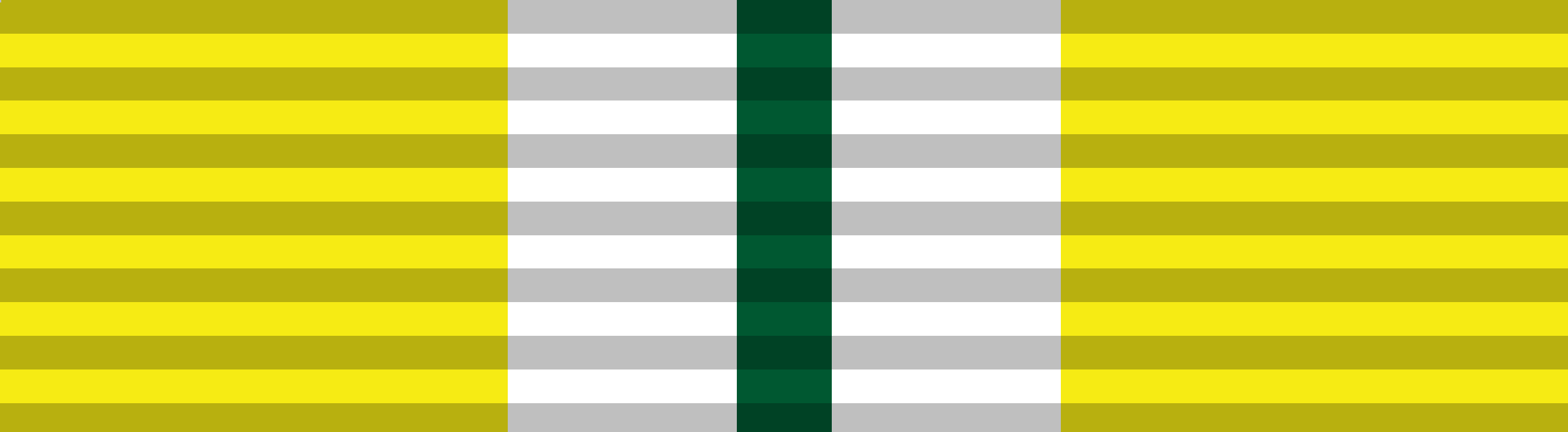

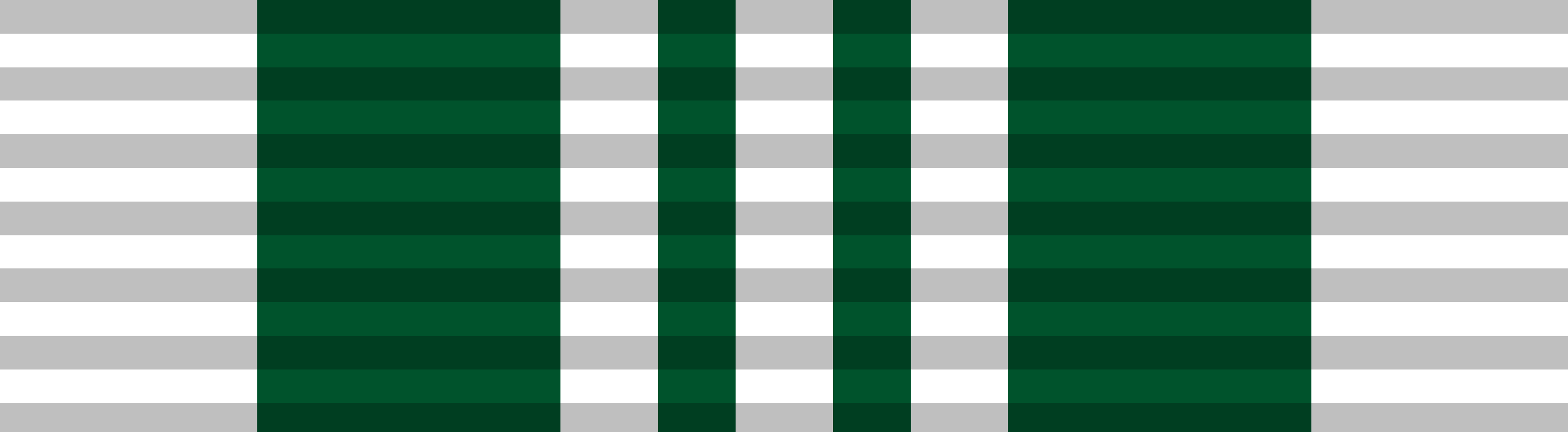

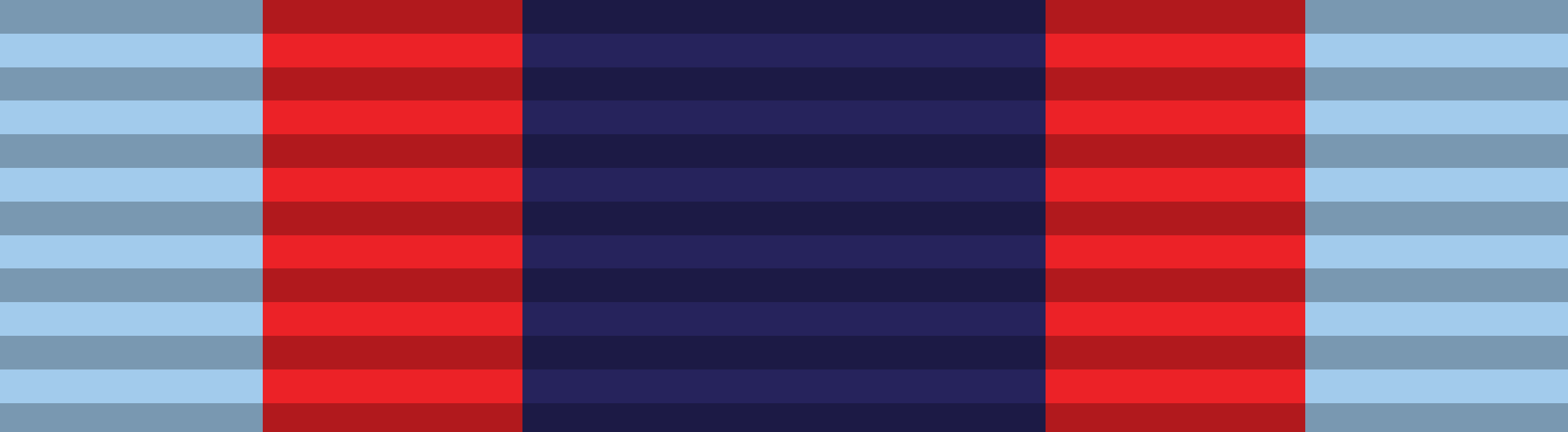

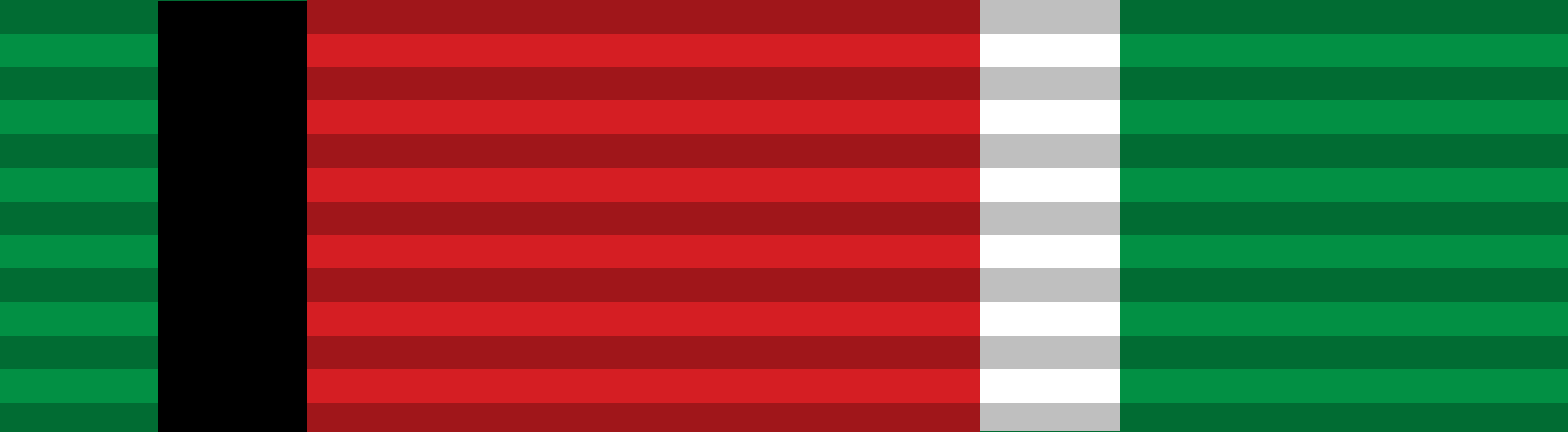

Pakistan Navy Operations Branch Badge
Command at Sea insignia
Nishan-e-Imtiaz (Civilian) (Order of Excellence)
Nishan-e-Imtiaz (Military) (Order of Excellence)	Hilal-e-Imtiaz (Military) (Crescent of Excellence)	Sitara-e-Imtiaz (Military) (Star of Excellence)	Tamgha-e-Imtiaz (Military) (Medal of Excellence)
Tamgha-e-Basalat (Medal of Good Conduct)	Tamgha-e-Baqa (Nuclear Test Medal) 1998	Tamgha-e-Istaqlal Pakistan (Escalation with India Medal) 2002	Tamgha-e-Azm (Medal of Conviction) (2018)
10 Years Service Medal	20 Years Service Medal	30 Years Service Medal	35 Years Service Medal
Jamhuriat Tamgha (Democracy Medal) 1988	Qarardad-e-Pakistan Tamgha (Resolution Day Golden Jubilee Medal) 1990	Tamgha-e-Salgirah Pakistan (Independence Day Golden Jubilee Medal) 1997	Pakistan Tamgha (Pakistan Medal)

== Dates of Rank ==
Insignia	Rank	Date
	Admiral (CNS)	October 2023
	Vice Admiral	September 2021
	Rear Admiral	November 2017
	Commodore	July 2014
	Captain	October 2010
	Commander	July 2005
	Lieutenant commander	May 2000
	Lieutenant	October 1993
	Sub Lieutenant	June 1990
	Midshipman	June 1989

Ships that Admiral Ashraf has served Commanding Officer of:

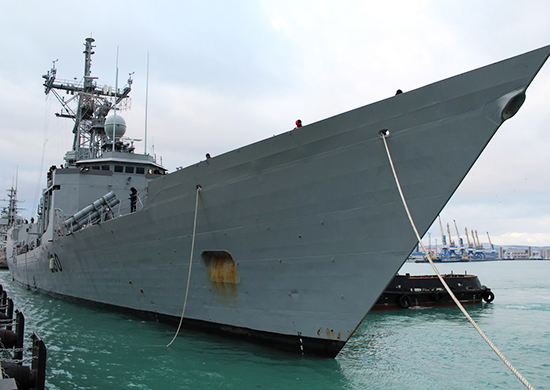
PNS ALAMGIR

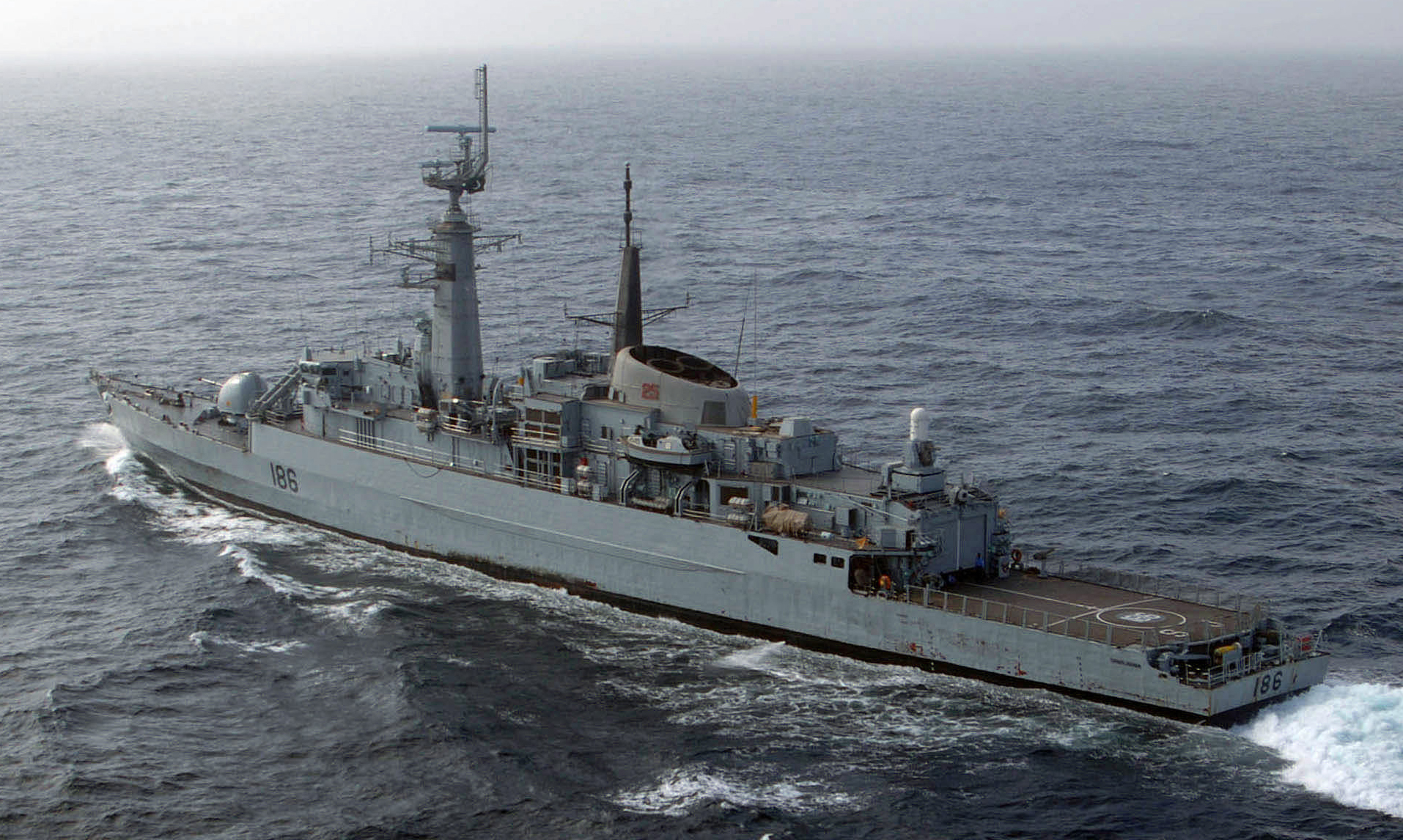
PNS SHAHJAHAN

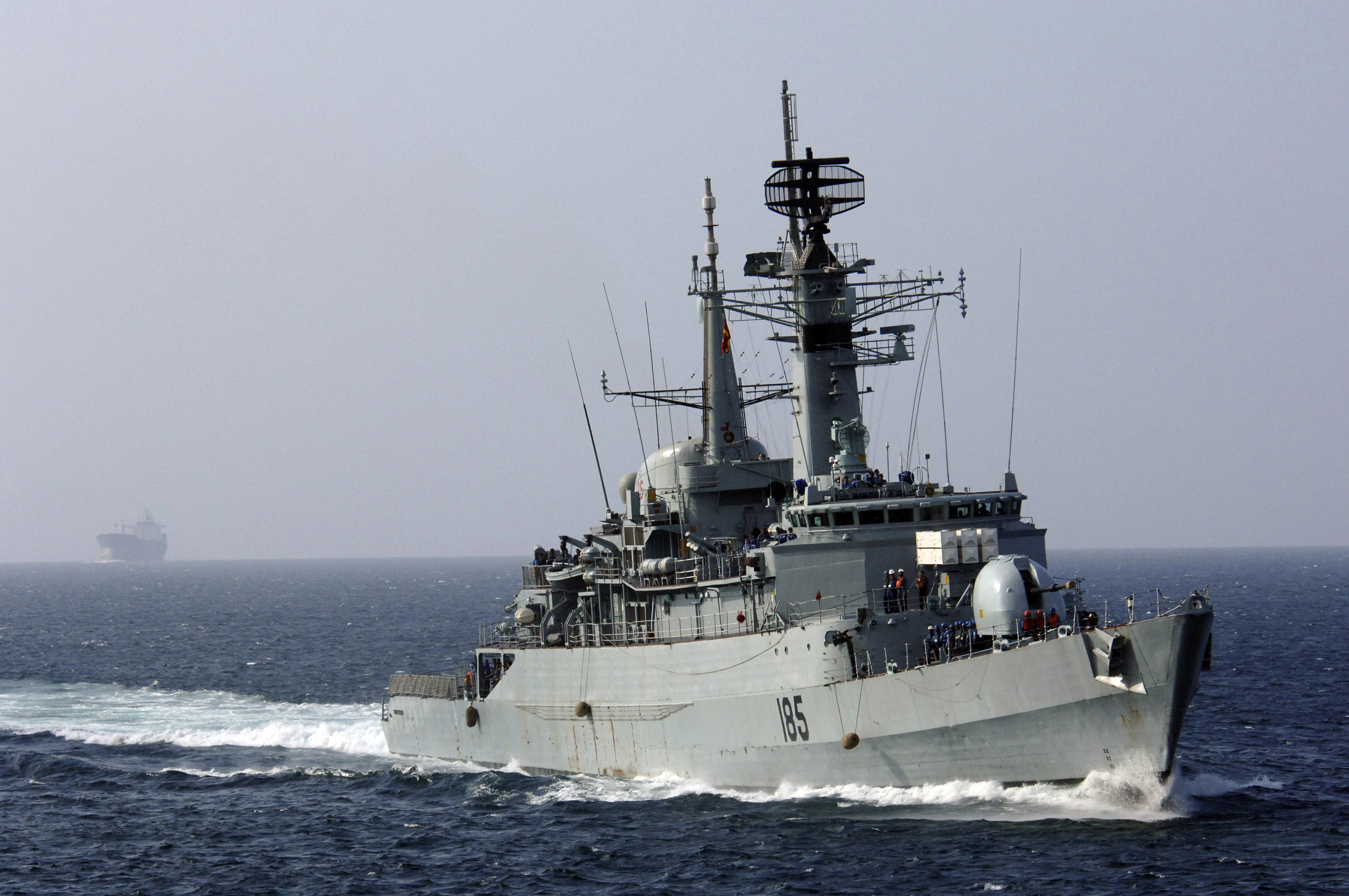
PNS TIPPU SULTAN
