= Syed Arifullah Hussaini =

Pakistan Navy officer (1961–2020)

Vice Admiral Syed Arifullah Hussaini HI(M) SI(M) TBt
- سيد عارف الله حسينى
- Born: Syed Arifullah Hussaini; 23 April 1961; Karachi, Pakistan
- Died: 17 December 2020 (aged 59); Karachi, Sindh, Pakistan
- Burial place: Karachi, Sindh, Pakistan
- Military career
- Allegiance: Pakistan
- Branch: Pakistan Navy
- Service years: 1978–2017
- Rank: Vice Admiral
- Commands: Commander, Pakistan Fleet; Deputy Chief of Naval Staff (Personnel); Director-general Joint Warfare & Training; Commander Coast
- Conflicts: 2001-2002 India-Pakistan standoff; War in North West-Pakistan; Operation Enduring Freedom–HOA; 2016 India-Pakistan military confrontation
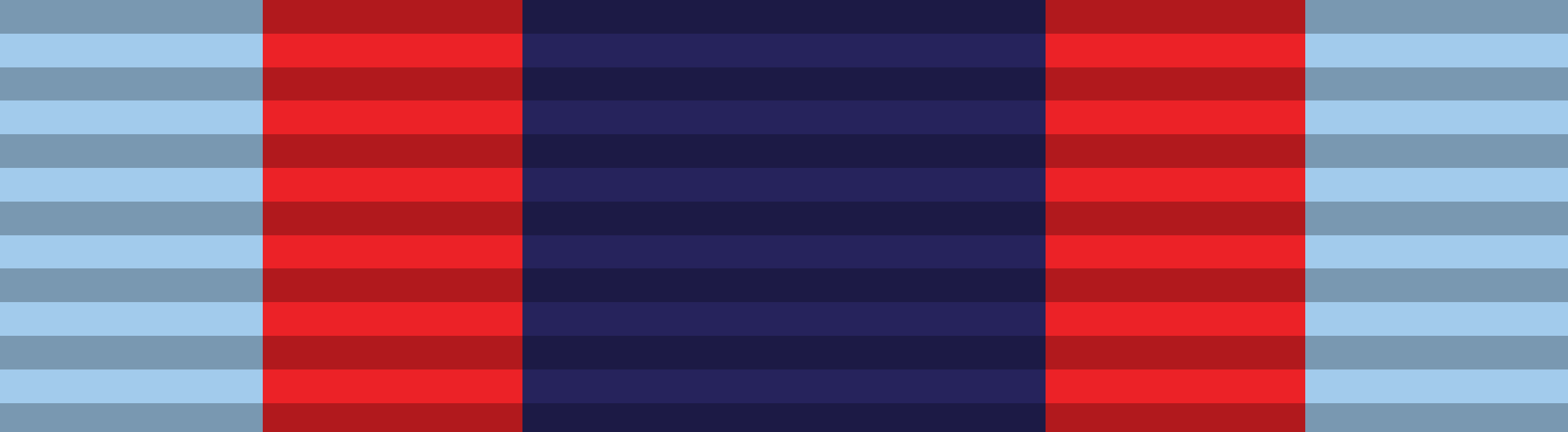
- Awards: Hilal-e-Imtiaz (Military); Sitara-e-Imtiaz (Military); Tamgha-e-Basalat

Syed Arifullah Hussaini HI(M) SI(M) TBt (Urdu: سيد عارف الله حسينى ; 23 April 1961 – 17 December 2020) also known as S.A. Hussaini, was a vice admiral in the Pakistan Navy. He also served as the Commander, Pakistan Fleet on 14 June 2016.

== Biography ==
Hussaini was born in Karachi, Sindh in Pakistan. He was educated at the Cadet College Petaro in Jamshoro and left the college to attend the Pakistan Naval Academy in Karachi. He graduated from the Naval Academy in 1981, and gained commissioned as Sub-Lieutenant.

He was further educated at the Command and Staff College in Quetta, and attained MS in War studies from the National Defence University (NDU). He also studied for the national defence course in China, and qualified for the surface warfare from the United States.

His sea command assignment included his role as commanding officer of PNS Zulfikar and PNS Tariq. In 2008, he was promoted to one-star rank, and Commodore Hussaini served as the ACNS (Plans) and ACNS (Personnel). In 2013, Rear-Admiral Hussaini was appointed Commander Coast (COMCOAST). He was promoted to three-star rank, Vice-Admiral, in 2014, and took over the command of Karachi, as COMKAR, which is the responsibility of naval establishment in Karachi.

In 2014, Vice-Admiral Hussain was in the race to be appointed as a four-star admiral and take over the command of the Navy as its Chief of Naval Staff, along with Vice-Admiral Khan Hasham bin Saddique and Vice-Admiral Z.M. Abbasi. However, the most senior admiral in the Navy, Admiral Moh'd Zakaullah was promoted to the four-star appointment.

On 3 December 2015, Vice-Admiral Hussaini was appointed as a senior fleet commander in the Pakistan Navy, taking over the command, from Vice-Admiral.

He has been decorated with Hilal-e-Imtiaz (Military), Sitara-e-Imtiaz (Military) and Tamgha-e-Basalat

On 17 December 2020, he died due to COVID-19.

== Awards and decorations ==

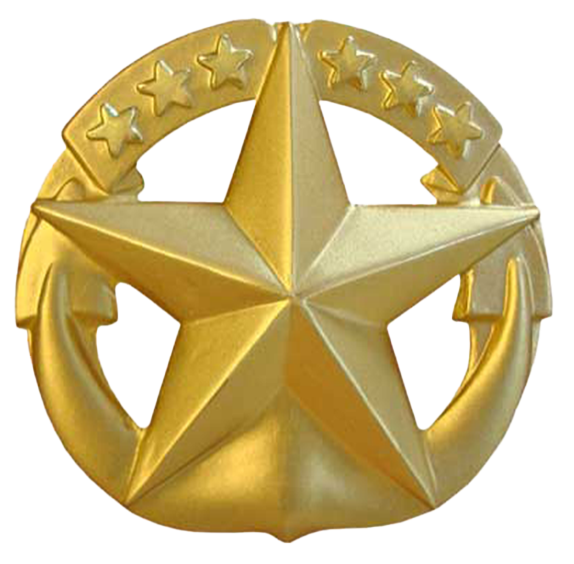

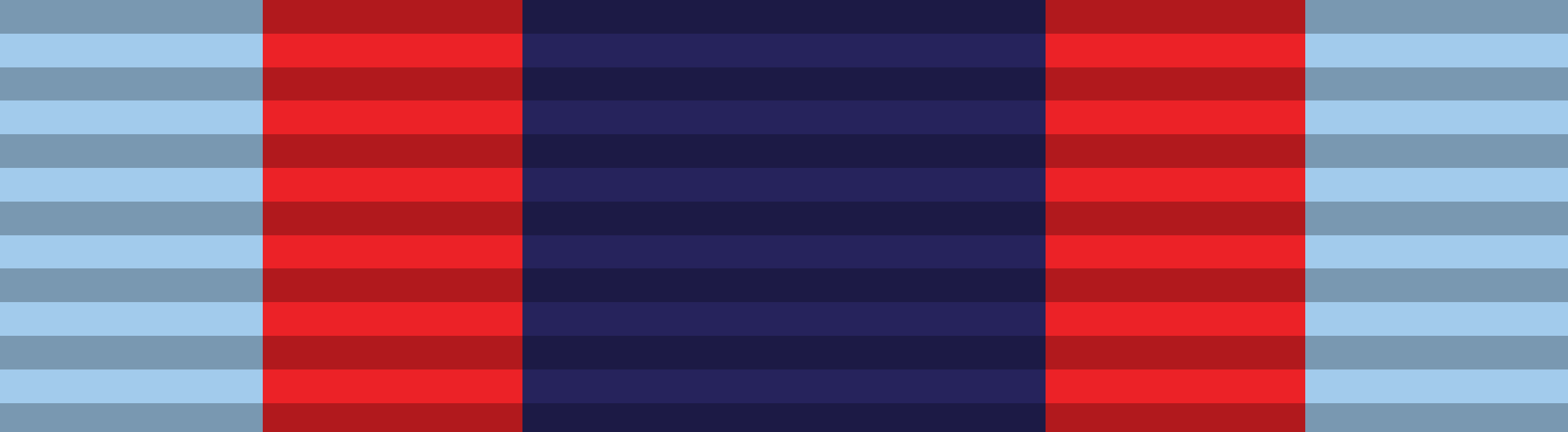

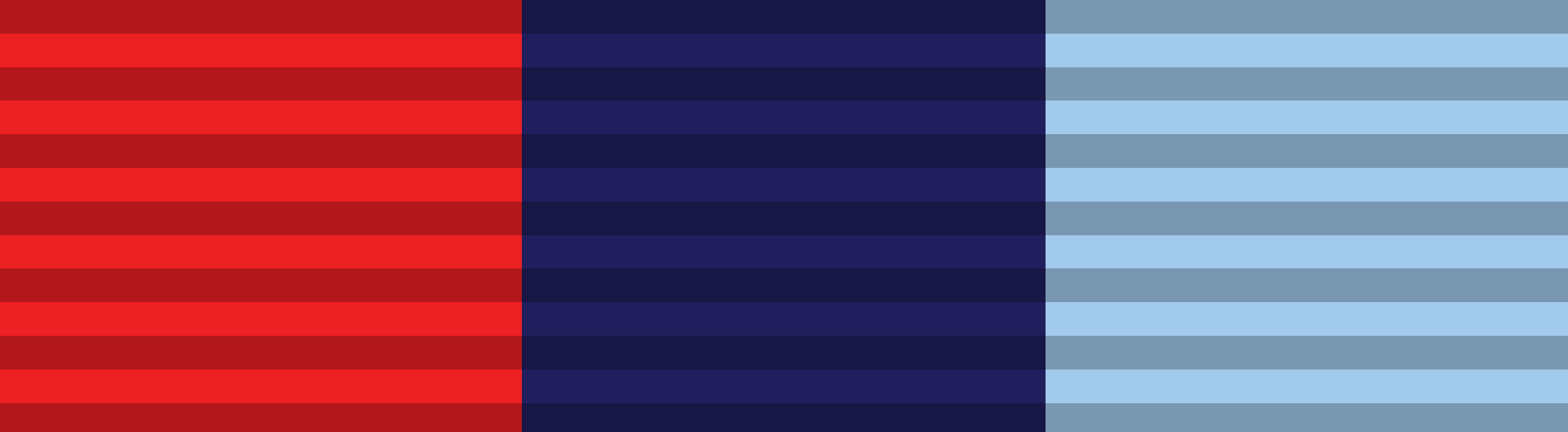

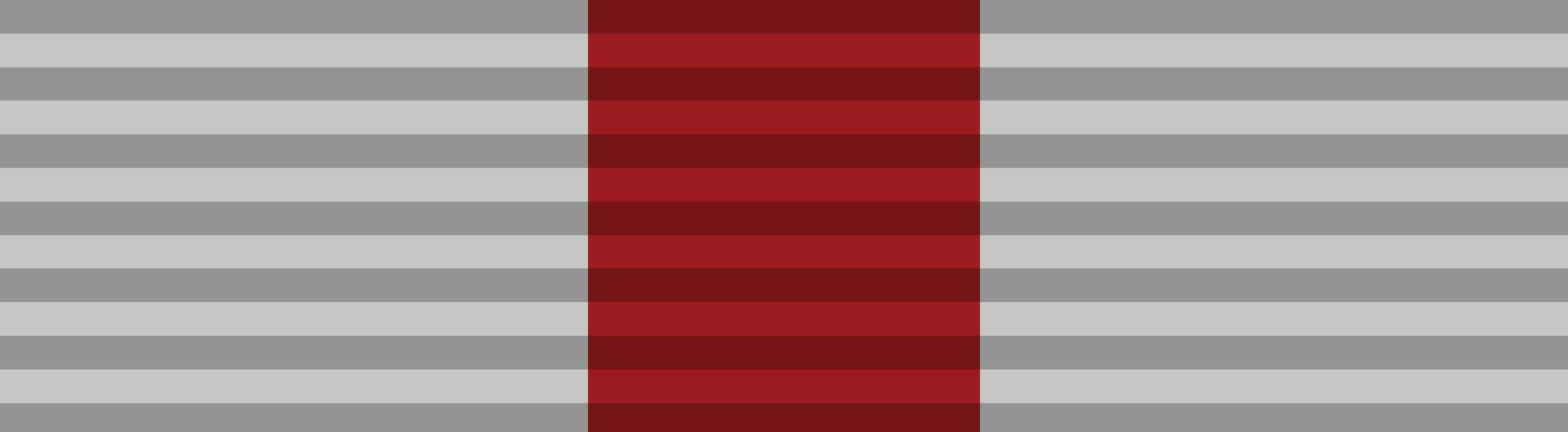

Pakistan Navy Operations Branch Badge
Command at Sea insignia
Hilal-e-Imtiaz (Military) (Crescent of Excellence)	Sitara-e-Imtiaz (Military) (Star of Excellence)	Tamgha-e-Basalat (Medal of Good Conduct)	Tamgha-e-Baqa (Nuclear Test Medal) 1998
Tamgha-e-Istaqlal Pakistan (Escalation with India Medal) 2002	10 Years Service Medal	20 Years Service Medal	30 Years Service Medal
35 Years Service Medal	40 Years Service Medal	Tamgha-e-Sad Saala Jashan-e- Wiladat-e-Quaid-e-Azam (100th Birth Anniversary of Muhammad Ali Jinnah) 1976	Hijri Tamgha (Hijri Medal) 1979
Jamhuriat Tamgha (Democracy Medal) 1988	Qarardad-e-Pakistan Tamgha (Resolution Day Golden Jubilee Medal) 1990	Tamgha-e-Salgirah Pakistan (Independence Day Golden Jubilee Medal) 1997	Command & Staff College Quetta Student Medal

== See also ==
- Pakistan Navy
