= Commander Karachi =

Officer in command in the Pakistan Navy

- Insignia of COMKAR

- Flag of a Pakistan Navy three-star vice admiral

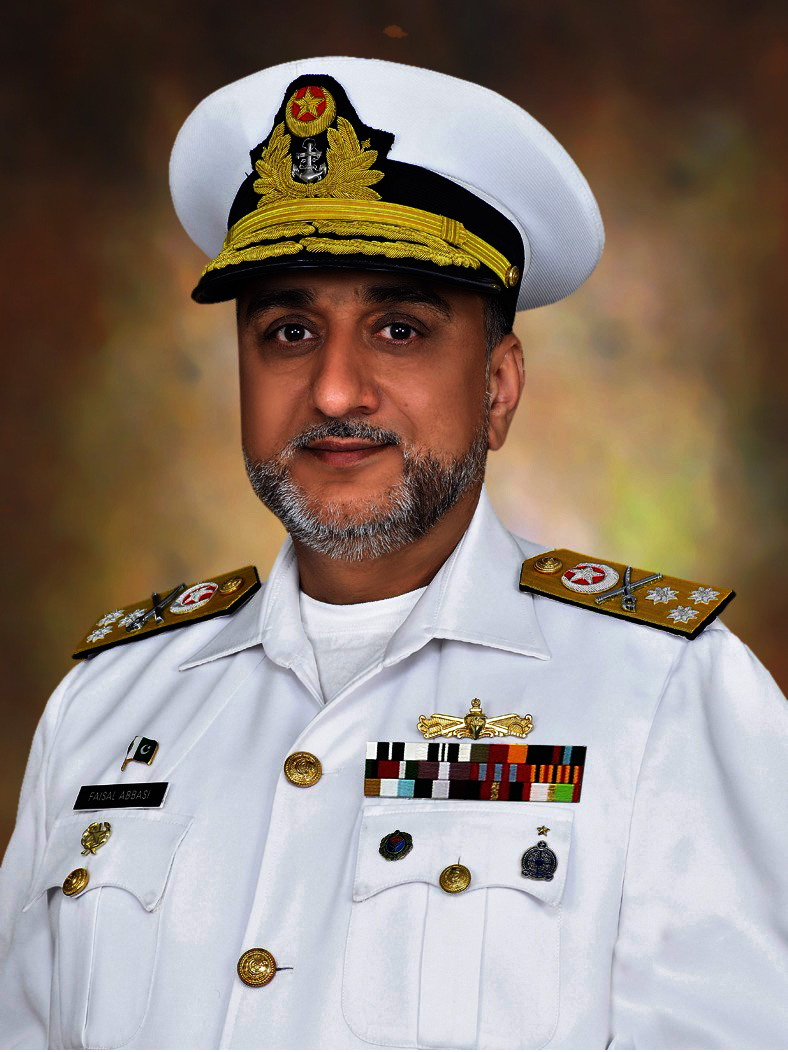
- Incumbent; Muhammad Faisal Abbasi since 12 October 2024
- Type: Command-in-field
- Status: Active
- Abbreviation: COMKAR
- Reports to: Vice Chief of the Naval Staff
- Residence: Karachi Cantonment, Pakistan
- Seat: HQ Comkar, Karachi, Pakistan
- Appointer: Chief of the Naval Staff
- Term length: Indeterminate
- Precursor: Chiefs of Staff (departmental)

The Commander Karachi (COMKAR) heads the Pakistan Karachi Command, overseeing the administration and operation of all naval establishments and training units in Karachi. It is one of the six command-in-field designations in the navy and ranks as the second-highest position after the commander, Pakistan Fleet (COMPAK). Muhammad Faisal Abbasi has served as COMKAR since 12 October 2024.
