= Flag Officer Sea Training =

Flag Officer Sea Training (FOST) may refer to:

- Flag Officer Sea Training (India)
- Flag Officer Sea Training (Pakistan)
- Commander Fleet Operational Standards and Training, formerly called Flag Officer Sea Training.
