= PNS Munsif =

PNS Munsif may refer to the following ships of the Pakistan Navy

- PNS Munsif (1959), an Adjutant-class minesweeper
- PNS Munsif (M166), lead ship of the Munsif-class minehunter, formerly in service with the French Navy as Sagittaire (M650)
