= French ship Sagittaire =

Seven ships of the French Navy have borne the name Sagittaire in honour of the constellation Sagittarius:

== Ships ==
- Sagittaire (1761), a 50-gun ship of the line.
- Sagittaire (1882), an Aspic-class gunboat.
- Sagittaire (1916), a hired ship.
- Sagittaire (1942), an auxiliary troopship.
- Sagittaire (1955), a coastal minesweeper.
- Sagittaire (1988), a Tripartite-class minehunter, sold to Pakistan in 1992 and currently in service as PNS Munsif (M166) .
- Sagittaire (1995), a Tripartite-class minehunter.
Ships of the French Navy named Sagittaire
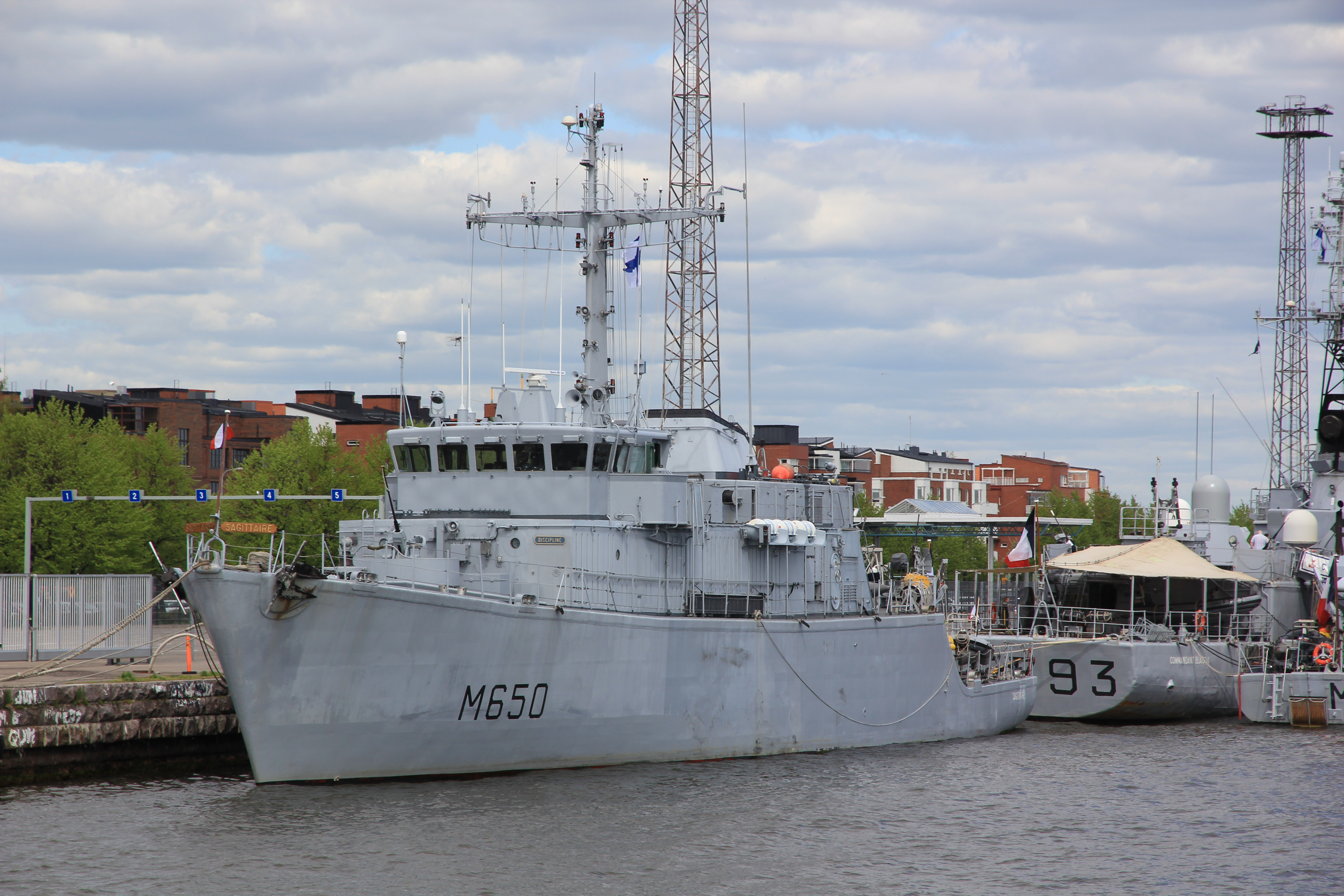
Sagittaire (1996)

== See also ==
- USS Sagittarius (AKN-2)
