= Abbas Raza =

Pakistani admiral

Vice Admiral Abbas Raza HI(M) SI(M) TI(M)
- V-Adm. Abbas Raza addressing a press conference during multinational naval exercise AMAN 2011
- Born: Abbas Raza; 16 May 1955 (age 71); Lahore, Pakistan
- Military career
- Allegiance: Pakistan
- Branch: Ops Pakistan Navy
- Service years: 1973–2012
- Rank: Vice admiral
- Commands: Commander Pakistan Fleet; DCNS (Operations) at Navy NHQ; DG Joint Trig. at Joint Staff HQ; Commander Karachi coast DCNS (Projects) at Navy NHQ; OTC 9th Auxiliary Squadron
- Conflicts: Kargil war in 1999; Indo-Pakistani standoff in 2001; Indo-Pakistani standoff in 2008; Piracy off the coast of Somalia: Operation Umeed-e-Nuh; Exercise Aman in Gulf of Aden; War in North-West Pakistan: Operation Madad; Operation Mehran
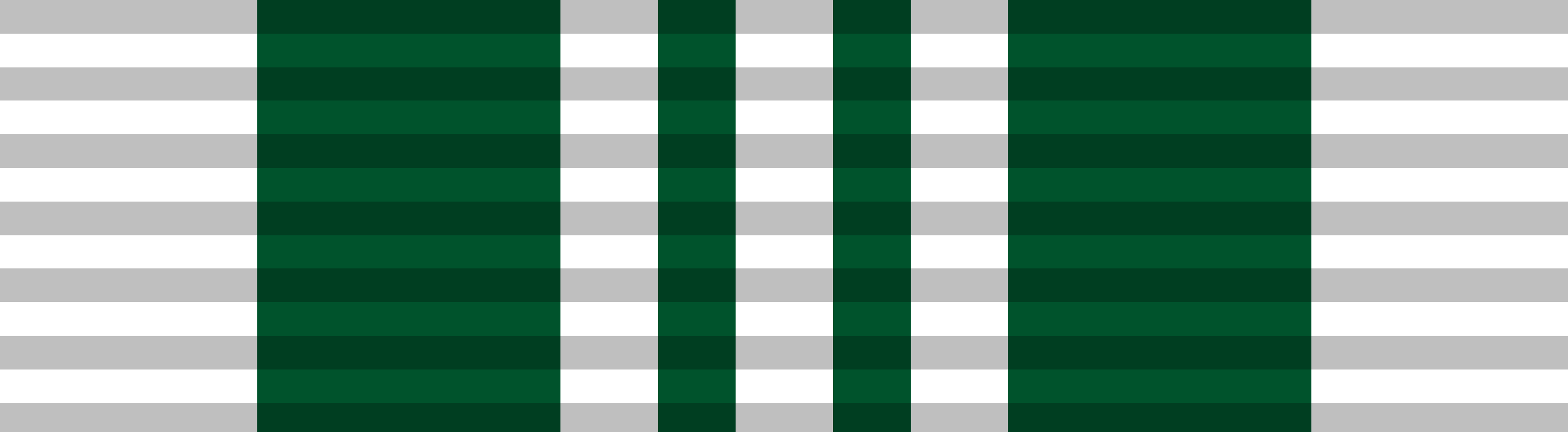
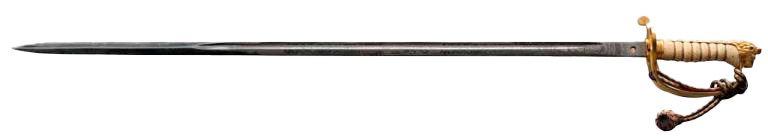
- Awards: Hilal-e-Imtiaz (Military) Sitara-e-Imtiaz (Military) Tamgha-e-Imtiaz (Military) Sword of Honor
- Other work: Director of PMC, the Bahria Security and Systems.

Abbas Raza HI(M) SI(M) TI(M) (Urdu: عباس رضا; born 16 May 1955), was a retired vice admiral in the Pakistan Navy who served as Commander, Pakistan Fleet from 2010 until his retirement in 2012.

== Biography ==
Abbas Raza was born on 16 May 1955 in Lahore, Punjab in Pakistan where he secured his matriculation, and joined the Pakistan Navy in June 1973. He was directed to attend the Pakistan Naval Academy in Karachi, and passed out with communications at the top of his class when he was conferred the coveted Sword of Honor in 1975. He was qualified as the surface officer and served in the Surface Command of the Navy.

He gained commissioned in the Naval Operations Branch as Sub-Lieutenant, and was later sent to attend and complete the staff course at the Royal Naval Staff College in Greenwich in the United Kingdom. He later went to attend the National Defence University (NDU) in Islamabad and graduated with MSc in Defence studies.

As Commander, he commanded the boat squadron, and held the commands of the PNS Badr and Tippu Sultan as Captain in 1990s. In 2003, Capt. Raza was posted at the Pakistan Embassy in Muscat in Oman as a defence attaché. Capt. Raza also briefly tenured at the Pakistan Embassy in Paris as an air attaché to French Air Force. Upon returning to Pakistan, Cdre. Abbas Raza was appointed to command the 9th Auxiliary Squadron, and briefly tenured as a military secretary to the office of the chief of naval staff at the Navy NHQ in Islamabad as two-star and three-star rank appointments. Rear-Admiral Raza's other appointment at the Navy NHQ also included his role as DCNS (Projects), DNCS (Operations) as well as being appointed as the Director-General of the Joint Warfare and Training (DG Joint Trig.) at the Joint Staff HQ in Rawalpindi.

In 2010, Vice-Admiral Raza took over the command of the Pakistan Fleet as its senior fleet commander, and later directed to command the Karachi coast as its field commander, COMKAR, and was responsible for naval units stationed in Karachi in 2011. In 2011, Raza faced severe criticism from news media pundits of failing to prevent terrorist attack on naval installations, and reportedly was not investigated in this incident by the Naval Intelligence and the Navy's crime branch.

In 2011, Raza was among the four senior admirals who were in the race for the promotion to be promoted as a four-star admiral in the Navy, included with seniority:

In 2012, Raza retired from his military service, and eventually joining the Bahria Security System, a private military company specializing in escort and security, as its Managing Director.

Raza died on 13 February 2023.

== Awards and decorations ==

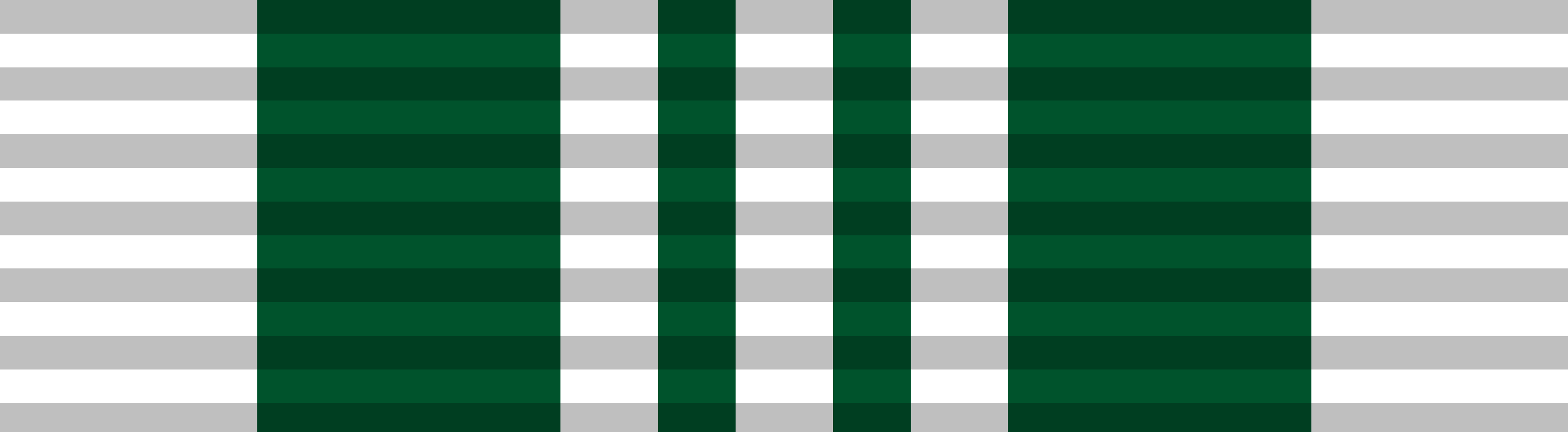

| Hilal-e-Imtiaz (Military) (Crescent of Excellence) | | Sitara-e-Imtiaz (Military) (Star of Excellence) | |
| Tamgha-e-Imtiaz (Military) (Medal of Excellence) | Tamgha-e-Baqa (Nuclear Test Medal) 1998 | Tamgha-e-Istaqlal Pakistan (Escalation with India Medal) 2002 | 10 Years Service Medal |
| 20 Years Service Medal | 30 Years Service Medal | 35 Years Service Medal | Tamgha-e-Sad Saala Jashan-e- Wiladat-e-Quaid-e-Azam (100th Birth Anniversary of Muhammad Ali Jinnah) 1976 |
| Hijri Tamgha (Hijri Medal) 1979 | Jamhuriat Tamgha (Democracy Medal) 1988 | Qarardad-e-Pakistan Tamgha (Resolution Day Golden Jubilee Medal) 1990 | Tamgha-e-Salgirah Pakistan (Independence Day Golden Jubilee Medal) 1997 |

== See also ==
- Pakistan Navy
