= Francis X. McInerney =

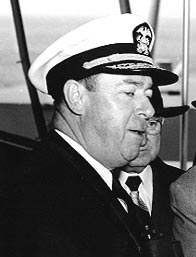
- RADM McInerney aboard USS Helena (CA-75), 1949
- Born: Francis Xavier McInerney; 28 March 1899; Cheyenne, Wyoming, US
- Died: 24 June 1956 (aged 57); San Diego, California, US
- Military career
- Allegiance: United States
- Branch: United States Navy
- Service years: June 1921 – 30 June 1955
- Rank: Vice admiral
- Service number: NSN: 0-56889
- Commands: USS Smith (DD-378); Destroyer Squadron 21; USS Washington (BB-56)
- Conflicts: World War II: Battle of the Coral Sea; Battle of Kula Gulf; Korean War
- Awards: Navy Cross; Silver Star Legion of Merit with Combat "V" Bronze Star with Combat "V"

Francis Xavier McInerney (28 March 1899 – 24 June 1956) was a United States Navy vice admiral, Navy Cross recipient, Silver Star recipient and namesake of USS McInerney (FFG-8).

== Biography ==
Francis X. McInerney was born on 28 March 1899 in Cheyenne, Wyoming. He was commissioned from the United States Naval Academy in June 1921. As a junior officer, his tours of duty included the ships, USS New Mexico (BB-40), USS Burns (DD-171), USS Williamson (DD-244), and USS Dobbin (AD-3).

In 1935, he received the degree of Bachelor of Laws from George Washington University Law School. Subsequent tours included USS Concord (CL-10), and instructor at the Post-Graduate School, Annapolis, Maryland.

=== World War II ===
Vice admiral (VADM) McInerney assumed command of USS Smith (DD-378) in May 1940, and was commanding that destroyer when the United States entered World War II. Later he was assigned to the ANZAC Squadron in the South Pacific and, as senior officer in destroyers, participated in the early strikes in the Solomons and the Battle of the Coral Sea.

In March 1943, he assumed command of Destroyer Squadron 21. He led his ships in the Solomons in the Battle of Kula Gulf and Battle of Kolombangara in July 1943. He was awarded the Bronze Star with Combat "V," the Navy Cross, Presidential Unit Citation, the Silver Star, and the Legion of Merit with Combat "V".

In August 1943, VADM McInerney was assigned as Senior Representative of Commander Destroyers in the South Pacific, and in March 1944, was named chief of staff for Commander Operational Training Command, Pacific Fleet. He assumed command of the battleship USS Washington (BB-56) in June 1945. In October 1946, VADM McInerney reported as commanding officer of the Naval Receiving Station, Treasure Island, California. He assumed command of Cruiser Division Three in March 1949. In January 1950, he became Commander Amphibious Training Command, Pacific Fleet. Subsequently, he commanded Amphibious Group Three, Pacific Fleet, and Service Squadron Three.

=== Post World War II ===
VADM McInerney's operations in the Korean War as Commander Joint Amphibious Task Forces Seven, Seventy-Six and Ninety-Two earned him the National Defense Service Medal, Korean Service Medal, and the United Nations Service Medal.

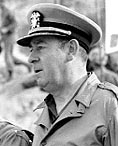
RADM Francis X. McInerney near Inchon, 1952

In May 1953, he became senior member, Board of Naval Inspection and Survey, West Coast Section. In October 1954, he was assigned as president of the Permanent General Court Martial, Eleventh Naval District. He retired 30 June 1955.

VADM Francis X. McInerney died on 24 June 1956 in San Diego, California.

== See also ==
- USS McInerney (FFG-8), US Navy frigate named for Francis X. McInerney
