= PNS Alamgir =

At least three ships of the Pakistan Navy have been named Alamgir:

- PNS Alamgir (1958), a C-class destroyer launched as HMS Creole in 1945 she was transferred to Pakistan and renamed in 1958. She was scrapped in 1982.
- PNS Alamgir (D160), a Gearing-class destroyer launched as USS Cone in 1945 she was transferred to Pakistan and renamed in 1982. She was scrapped in 1998.
- PNS Alamgir (F260), an Oliver Hazard Perry-class frigate launched as USS McInerney in 1978 she was transferred to Pakistan and renamed in 2010.
