= PNS Akram =

Naval base in Pakistan

Coordinates: 25.1009°N 62.3729°E

PNS Akram (Urdu: پایگاه بحریہ اکرم) is a naval base located in Gwadar, Balochistan, Pakistan. Established in 1983 and commissioned as PNS Akram in 1987, it serves as the forward operating base for the Pakistan Navy and acts as a military depot for all naval personnel stationed as part of the Western Command. The base also acts as a surveillance station from which the Pakistan Navy monitors activities at the Gwadar Port and the northern Arabian Sea. It was named in honor of Admiral Afzal Akram Rahman Khan, and is the first naval base to be established on the Makran coast of Pakistan's Balochistan province.
