= Coastal Command (Pakistan) =

Pakistan Navy establishment in Karachi

Pakistan Navy Coastal Command
- Country: Pakistan
- Allegiance: Pakistan
- Branch: Pakistan Navy
- Role: Maritime security
- Part of: Pakistan Navy Western Command; Pakistan Marines; Special Service Group; CTS Coastal; NPM Coastal
- Garrison/HQ: Karachi, Pakistan
- Nickname: COMCOAST

Commanders
- Current commander: R/ADM Faisal Amin HI(M) since 24 October 2024
- First commander: V/ADM Iftikhar Ahmed

Coastal Command is a coastal defence and fortification command of the Pakistan Navy, operating under the authority of a two-star rear admiral or a three-star vice admiral Commander Coast (COMCOAST). It manages maritime and all creek coastal areas in the country. It is one of the seven component commands of the navy with offices in Karachi. It is tasked with conducting defensive measures for maintaining and operating ports, harbour, and ground-based air defence of the navy, in addition to providing logistics support to naval fleet, and the Maritime Security Agency (MSA) units, a coastal guard branch of the navy.

Also responsible for the national security and maritime environment, including sea projects of China–Pakistan Economic Corridor (CPEC) infrastructure, it is commanded by a Vice Admiral known as Commander Coast. Coastal Command is the countrywide authority of all naval units and establishments, including the Western Command, the Pakistan Marines, Special Service Group, CTS Coastal and NPM Coastal among others.

Its first commander was Vice Admiral Iftikhar Ahmed.

== Responsibilities ==
Its main duties are focused on providing computer and network surveillance support to fleet, counter piracy, coordinated counterterrorism and explosive ordnance disposal (EOD) operations, in addition to carrying marine salvage and combat search and rescue operations. The command is also tasked with non-combat assignments such as responding to natural disaster with responsibilities for providing humanitarian aid in emergency.

== Jurisdiction ==
In the west, it works under the jurisdiction of the east to Jiwani, extending 1000 kms of the country's coastline, which includes Makran towards Karachi, and creek areas towards the east of International Border.

== See also ==
- Pakistan Navy Northern Command
- Pakistan Navy Hydrographic Department
- Pakistan Navy Western Command
