= Pakistan Navy Western Command =

Pakistan Navy Western Command (COMWEST)
- Pakistan Navy Western Command insignia
- Country: Pakistan
- Branch: Pakistan Navy
- Headquarters: PNS Akram, Gwadar
- Nickname: West Navy
- Engagements: Siachen conflict Indo-Pakistani War of 1999

Commanders
- Commander West, COMWEST: R/ADM Adnan Majeed

The Western Naval Command (abbreviated COMWEST) is a naval military command of the Pakistan Navy held by the Commander, West, a senior flag officer of Rear Admiral. COMWEST was a type commander post and now has been fully integrated to an Admin Authority post reporting directly to VCNS at NHQ. Its units and establishments are mainly scattered across the province of Balochistan, and has an approximate area of 700 miles. Its headquarters is at PNS Akram in Gwadar.

The Western Command mandates an area of responsibility of the western contingent of the country and to maintain the efficiency of the command many bases and military establishments have been placed under the COMWEST. Establishments and units include PNS Akram, the headquarters at Gwadar which is also a depot for detachments; PNS Makran, an airbase at Pasni; a naval base at Jiwani; and the 3rd Marine Battalion consisting of 800 marines. COMWEST command provides logistic and administrative support as well as security to the naval station at Turbat, which is under development. COMWEST is also responsible for the security of the Gwadar port.
