= Commander, Pakistan Fleet =

Appointment in Pakistan fleet

Commander Pakistan Fleet

- Incumbent; V/ADM Abdul Munib since 10 October 2024
- Navy
- Style: ADM
- Type: Fleet Commander
- Abbreviation: COMPAK
- Member of: Pakistan Fleet Command
- Website: Official Website

Commander Pakistan Fleet (COMPAK) is a formal title in the Pakistan Navy to denote the head (usually a two star or three star vice admiral) of Pakistan Fleet Command. The role is responsible for fleet support, progressive transition of the fleet, and the effectiveness of the force. The COMPAK is also assigned with responsibilities to oversee combat and staff capabilities of the fleet such as deployment of the forces, in addition to ensure equipment capacities designed to improve "operational readiness".

The COMPAK is one of the four major administrative authorities and one of the seven total commands of the navy such as Commander, Karachi (COMKAR), a major naval base, Commander, Logistics (COMLOG), Northern Command (COMNOR), Commander, Coast (COMCOAST), Commander Central Punjab (COMCEP), Flag Officer Sea Training (FOST), and the commander fleet itself. The fleet commander heads destroyer squadron, naval aviation, surface warfare, and other surface operations and anti-submarine warfare designed for multiple roles such as equipments, including watercraft, weapons, arms, and naval bases.

== Surface and submarine warfare ==
- 25th Destroyer Squadron (DESRON-25)
- 18th Destroyer Squadron (DESRON-18)
- 14th Destroyer Squadron (DESRON-14)
- 5th Submarine Squadron (SUBRON-5)
- Aviation
- 9th Auxiliary & Minesweeper Squadron (AUXMIN-9)
- 21st Auxiliary Squadron (AUXRON-21)
- PNS RAZA
- Pakistan Navy Tactical School (PNTS)
- PNS Haider
- FMG
- WATT
- MHQ
- BEAMER

== Appointment style ==
When a new head takes the command as COMPAK, it is literary known as "change of command" ceremony held at the official workplace of the commander in Karachi. During the ceremony, a guard of honour is presented to the new head, while the incumbent officer hands over scroll command to the new COMPAK.

== List of commanders ==
#	Name	Picture	Start date	End date	Ref(s)
1	Asaf Humayun		January 2006	—N/a	
2	Shahid Iqbal		June 2008	December 2009	
3	Abbas Raza		November 2010	November 2011	
4	Zafar Mahmood Abbasi		2014	2015	
5	Syed Arifullah Hussaini		2016	2017	
6	Muhammad Amjad Khan Niazi		2017	May 2019	
7	Naveed Ashraf		October 2020	February 2023	
