= PNS Munsif (M166) =

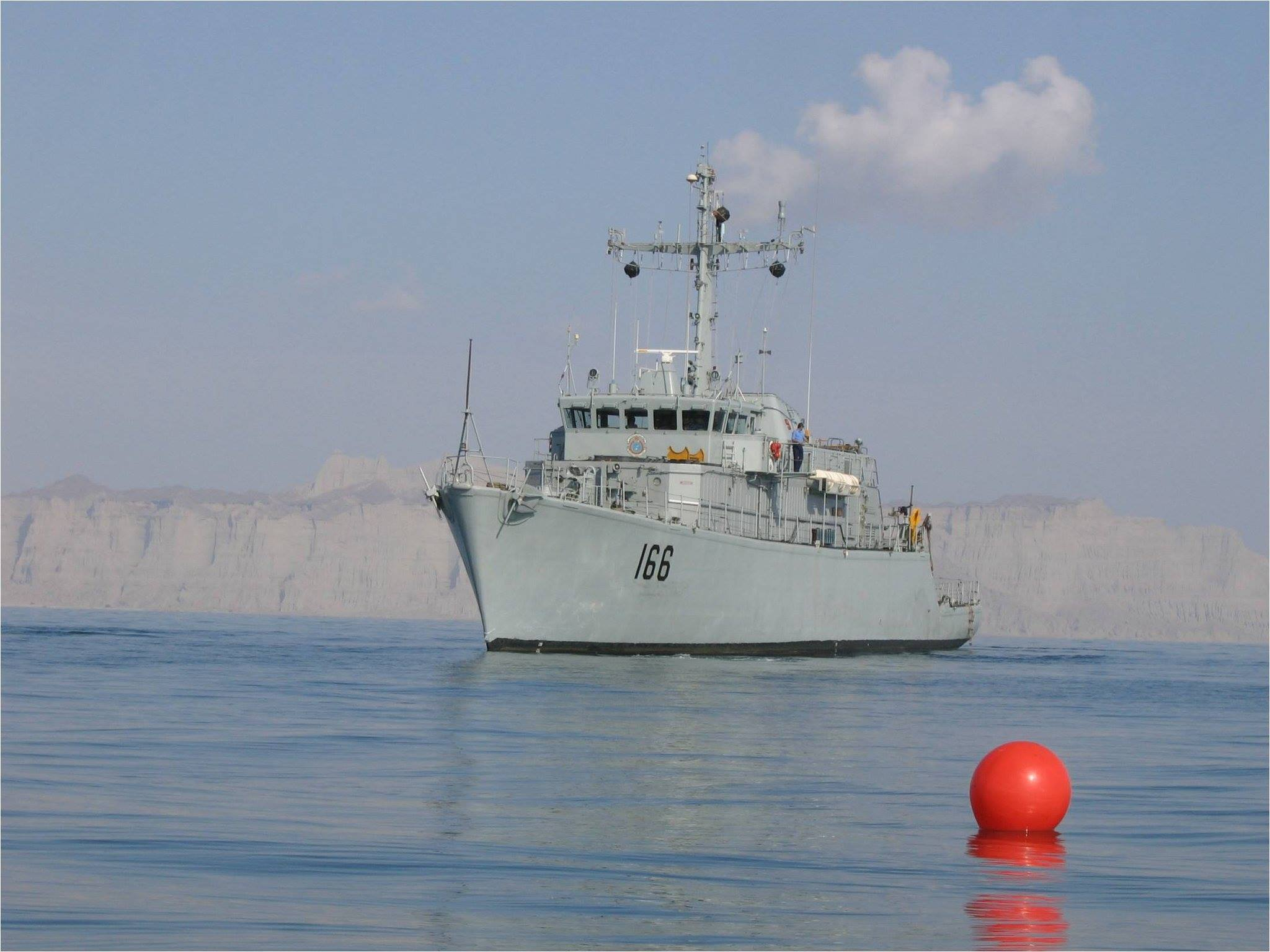
- PNS Munsif (M166) Conducting Mine Countermeasure Operations off Makran Coast in Indian Ocean.

History

France
- Name: Sagittaire
- Builder: Lorient Arsenal, Lorient
- Launched: 9 November 1988
- Commissioned: 27 July 1989
- Identification: M650
- Fate: Sold to Pakistan

Pakistan
- Name: Munsif
- Acquired: 24 September 1992
- Commissioned: 26 October 1992
- Home port: Karachi Naval Dockyard
- Identification: M166
- Status: Ship in active service

General characteristics
- Class & type: Munsif-class minehunter
- Displacement: 535 t (527 long tons) empty; 605 t (595 long tons) full load
- Length: 51.6 m (169 ft)
- Beam: 8.96 m (29.4 ft)
- Height: 18.5 m (61 ft)
- Draught: 3.50 m (11.5 ft)
- Propulsion: 1 × 1,400 kW (1,900 bhp) Werkspoor RUB-215 V12 diesel engine; 2 × 89 kW (120 shp) ACEC active rudders; 1 × HOLEC bow propeller
- Speed: 15 knots (28 km/h)
- Range: 3,000 nautical miles (5,600 km) at 12 knots (22 km/h)
- Boats & landing craft carried: 2 × PAP 104 ROV
- Complement: 55 (10 officers, 45 Enlists)
- Sensors & processing systems: 1 × DUBM-21B sonar; 1 × Decca 1229 navigation radar
- Armament: 1 × 20 mm modèle F2 gun; 2 × 12.7 mm machine guns
- Aircraft carried: 1 × Aérospatiale Alouette III
- Aviation facilities: Flight deck

PNS Munsif (M166) (formerly Sagittaire (M650)) is the lead ship of the Munsif-class minehunter currently in service with the Pakistan Navy.

PNS Munsif is based on the French design, the Tripartite-class minehunter, and actively served in the French Navy as the minehunter Sagittaire (M650) before being refitted according to the Pakistani military's service when the Pakistan Navy had bought her in 1992.

== Construction, procurement, and deployment ==
=== French Navy service ===
Sagittaire was laid down in 1988, and launched on 9 November 1988 by its builder by French DCNS in Lorient Naval Yard in France. Her design was based on the Tripartite-class minehunter, a joint venture by Belgium, France and the Netherlands, and was commissioned as Sagittaire (M 650) into the French Navy on 27 July 1989. Her technology came from the Dutch Stork B.V. and Belgian ACEC, while DCNS designed the vessel.

In 1990–1991, she saw war operations during the military operation took place in the First Gulf War, and played a supporting role in the Gulf of Oman to clear the naval minefield.

=== Pakistan Navy service ===
In 1992, Pakistan entered in talks with France for acquiring the minehunters to improve its naval capability. The French Navy offered to sell Sagittaire which was immediately acquired through a quick payment transaction took place between the two countries in 1992.

Upon reporting to its homeport, the Karachi Naval Base, she was commissioned in the service of Pakistan Navy as Munsif on 26 October 1992 and went through the refitted modernization at the Karachi Naval Base according to the specifications required by the Pakistan military, including the installation and engineering of the flight deck to accommodate the Aérospatiale Alouette III helicopter.

In 1994, Pakistan entered in discussion with the France to design to build to commission the Munsif-class minehunter based on the Tripartite class, with PNS Munsif becoming the lead ship of her class. Based on Munsif, her two sister ships were eventually built in a cooperation between the DCNS and KSEW Ltd. in 1996 and 1997.

As of 2005, PNS Munsif remained in active service for the Pakistan Navy.
