= USS McInerney =

1978 Oliver Hazard Perry-class frigate

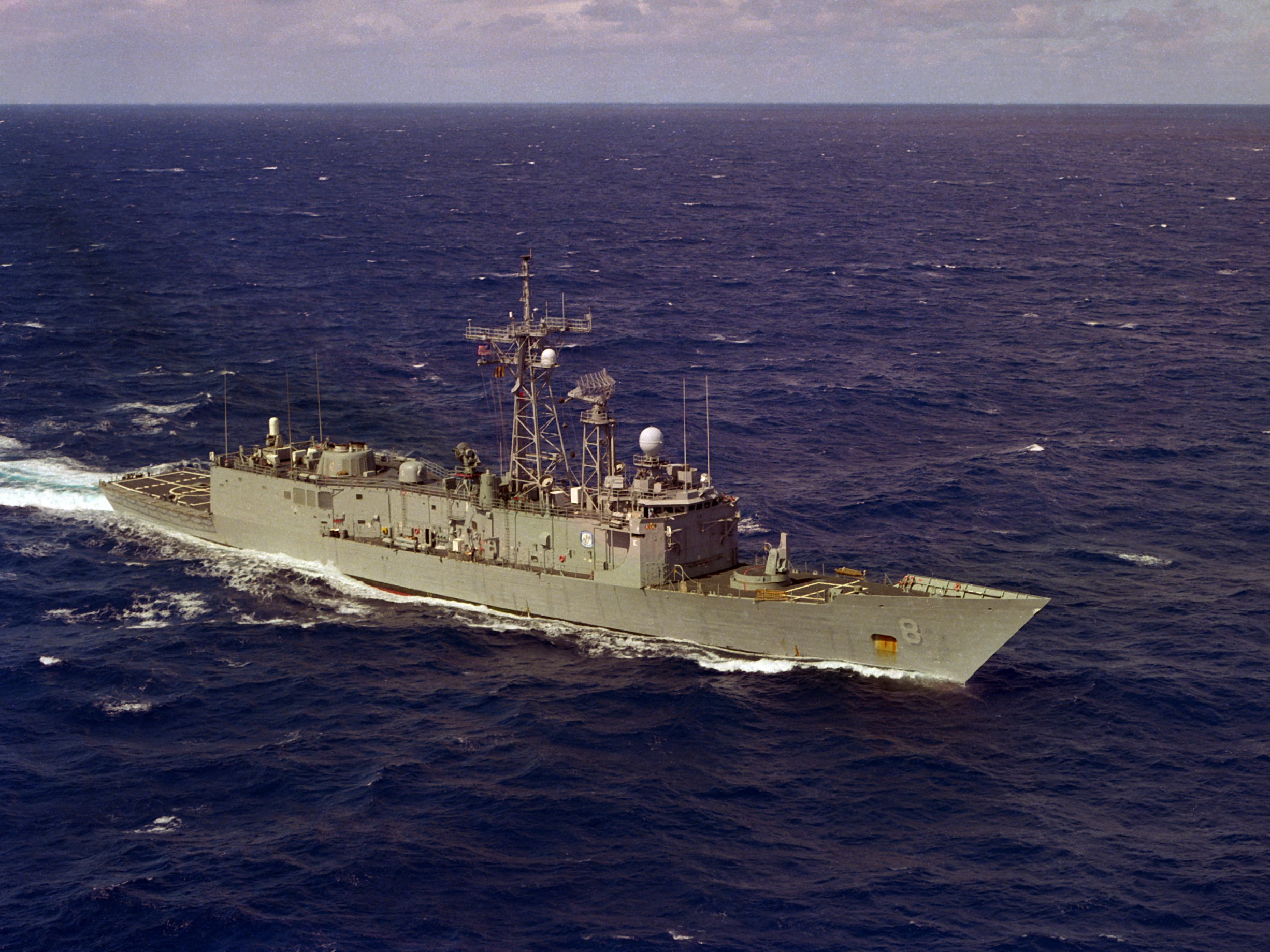
- USS McInerney underway on 16 October 1992

History

United States
- Name: McInerney
- Namesake: Francis X. McInerney
- Awarded: 27 February 1976
- Builder: Bath Iron Works
- Laid down: 16 January 1978
- Launched: 4 November 1978
- Sponsored by: Joan McInerney Kelley
- Commissioned: 15 December 1979
- Decommissioned: 31 August 2010
- Stricken: 31 August 2010
- Home port: Mayport
- Identification: Code letters:NFXM; Hull number:FFG-8
- Motto: Fast, Fearless, and Gallant
- Honours and awards: See Awards
- Fate: Transferred to Pakistan, 2010
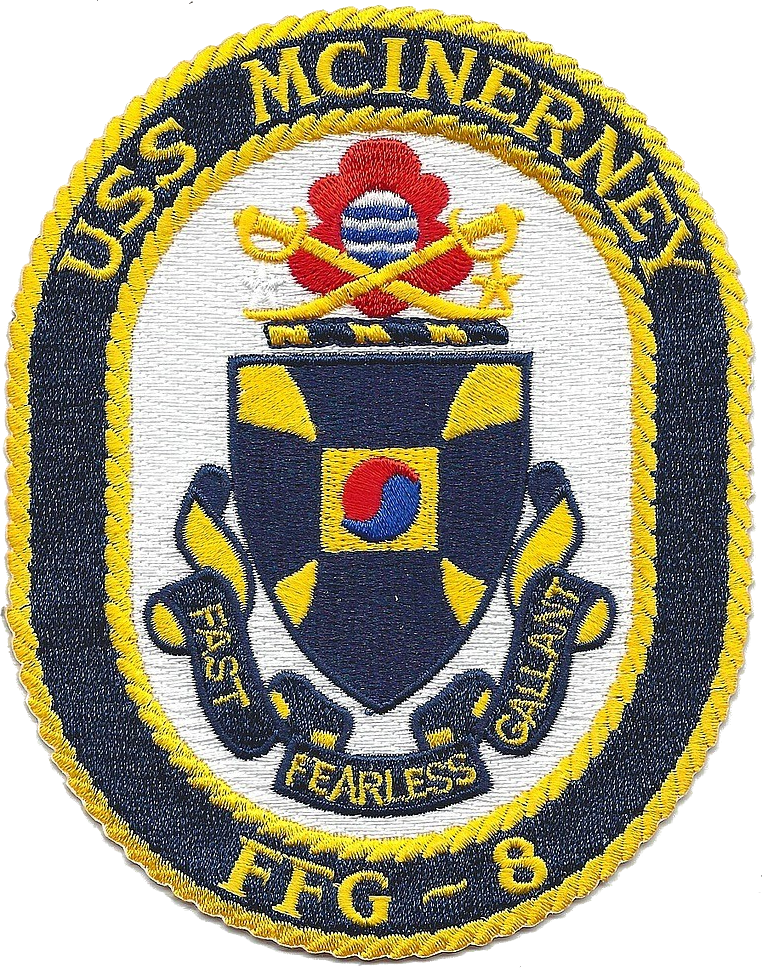
- Badge

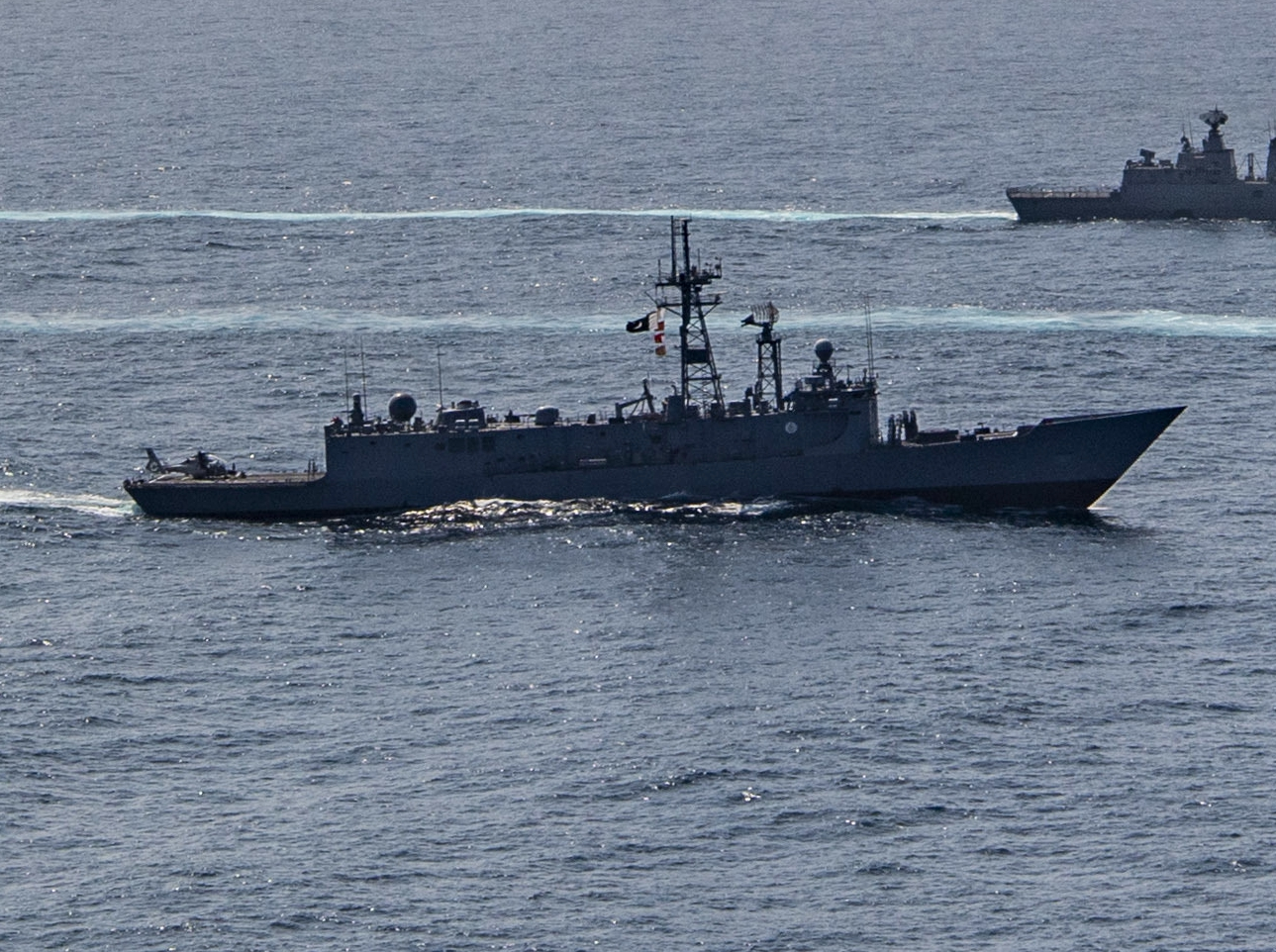
- PNS Alamgir (F260)

Pakistan
- Name: Alamgir
- Namesake: Alamgir I
- Acquired: 31 August 2010
- Commissioned: 31 August 2010
- Identification: Hull number: F 260
- Badge

General characteristics
- Class & type: Oliver Hazard Perry-class frigate
- Displacement: 4,100 long tons (4,200 t), full load
- Length: 453 feet (138 m), overall
- Beam: 45 feet (14 m)
- Draft: 22 feet (6.7 m)
- Propulsion: 2 × General Electric LM2500-30 gas turbines generating 41,000 shp (31 MW) through a single shaft and variable pitch propeller; 2 × Auxiliary Propulsion Units, 350 hp (260 kW) retractable electric azimuth thrusters for maneuvering and docking.
- Speed: over 29 knots (54 km/h)
- Range: 5,000 nautical miles at 18 knots (9,300 km at 33 km/h)
- Complement: 15 officers and 190 enlisted, plus SH-60 LAMPS detachment of roughly six officer pilots and 15 enlisted maintainers
- Sensors & processing systems: AN/SPS-49 air-search radar; AN/SPS-55 surface-search radar; CAS and STIR fire-control radar; AN/SQS-56 sonar.
- Electronic warfare & decoys: AN/SLQ-32
- Armament: As built: 1 × OTO Melara Mk 75 76 mm/62 caliber naval gun; 2 × Mk 32 triple-tube (324 mm) launchers for Mark 46 torpedoes; 1 × Vulcan Phalanx CIWS; 4 × .50-cal (12.7 mm) machine guns.; 1 × Mk 13 Mod 4 single-arm launcher for Harpoon anti-ship missiles and SM-1MR Standard anti-ship/air missiles (40 round magazine); Note: As of 2004, Mk 13 systems removed from all active US vessels of this class.
- Aircraft carried: 2 × SH-60 LAMPS III helicopter
- Aviation facilities: RAST

USS McInerney (FFG-8), is an Oliver Hazard Perry class guided-missile frigate, in service with the United States Navy from 1979 to 2010. She was then transferred to the Pakistan Navy and entered service as Alamgir (F260) in early 2011.

== Construction ==
USS McInerney (FFG-8), formerly PF-110, was the second ship of the Oliver Hazard Perry class and was named for Vice Admiral Francis X. McInerney (1899–1956). Ordered from Bath Iron Works on 27 February 1976 as part of the U.S. fiscal year 1975 (FY75) program, McInerney was laid down on 16 January 1978, launched on 4 November 1978, and commissioned on 15 December 1979. The ship was sponsored by Joan McInerney Kelley, daughter of the late Vice Admiral Francis Xavier McInerney.

=== Service in United States Navy ===
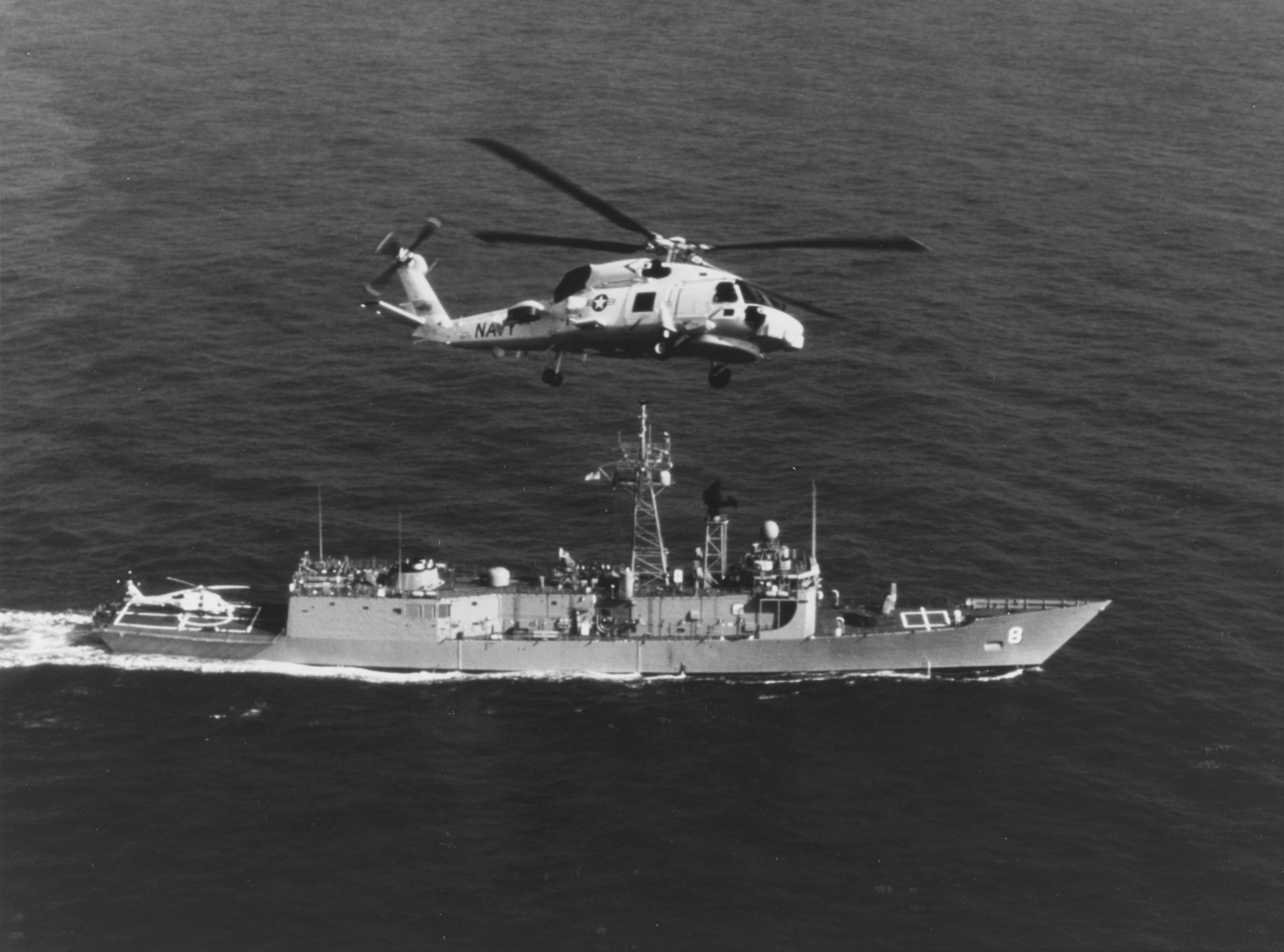
SH-60B Seahawk in flight over McInerney in March 1981

==== 1980s ====
McInerney's mission was to provide multi-threat protection for military and merchant shipping, amphibious task forces and underway replenishment groups. During her first two years of service, McInerney was the U.S. Navy test platform for the LAMPS MK-III (SH-60B helicopter) anti-submarine warfare system and the Recovery Assist, Secure, and Traverse (RAST) system. To be able to accommodate the SH-60B, McInerney was the first Oliver Hazard Perry-class frigate to receive a lengthened stern. Her efforts during this period earned her a Meritorious Unit Commendation. In 1981, McInerney appears to have been part of Destroyer Squadron 8.

McInerney's first major deployment to the Mediterranean Sea and Indian Ocean began in November 1982. During this deployment she embarked a LAMPS Mk-I (SH-2 Seasprite) helicopter detachment. McInerney made brief port visits to Tangiers, Morocco, and Catania, Sicily and supported the Multi-National Force in Beirut, Lebanon (earning her the Navy Expeditionary Medal). After transiting the Suez Canal, McInerney operated in the Indian Ocean and made port calls to Columbo, Sri Lanka, and Mombasa, Kenya. She also crossed the equator en route to Diego Garcia. Following this deployment, McInerney operated in the Caribbean and visited Port Limon, Costa Rica and Tela, Honduras. She received the Coast Guard Meritorious Unit Citation with the Operational Distinguishing Device, for her efforts in law enforcement during this period.

In October 1984, McInerney deployed again to the Middle East in the midst of the Iran/Iraq Tanker War. She had been fitted with the Phalanx CIWS and also carried a LAMPS Mk-I (SH-2 Seasprite) helicopter detachment. During this deployment she visited ports in Djibouti, United Arab Emirates, Saudi Arabia, Bahrain, Pakistan, and Palma, Spain. McInerney returned from this cruise in March 1985, and conducted law enforcement operations and other fleet exercises. In May 1986, USS McInerney began a 10-month-long overhaul (extended Selected Restricted Availability) in Boston, MA. During this yard period she received the AN/SQQ-89(V)2 Anti-Submarine Warfare Suite, fin stabilizers, and the Single Audio System. The RAST equipment was also reinstalled and made operational.

In August 1988, McInerney was underway for her third deployment— this one to the Mediterranean. This deployment was highlighted by McInerney being awarded the COMSIXTHFLT "Hook 'Em" Award for excellence in Anti-Submarine Warfare and a Meritorious Unit Commendation. On the morning of 21 December, McInerney received a distress call from the cement tanker Jenneastar, southwest of Sardinia, Italy. The crew had abandoned the ship when she began to list 25 degrees to port and started taking on water in bad weather. Ten Polish crewman and two Ghanaian stowaways were rescued and transported to Naples, Italy. McInerney returned from the Mediterranean in February 1989, and departed for the Northern Atlantic in the spring of 1989. Anti-Submarine Warfare operations led McInerney above the Arctic Circle, and McInerney returned to Mayport in May 1989.

==== 1990s ====
McInerney deployed to the Middle East in January 1991 and was awarded her second "Hook 'Em" Award after a brief ASW operation in the Mediterranean Sea. McInerney then entered the Persian Gulf in support of coalition forces against Iraq. McInerney performed in every warfare area during the conflict, including convoy escort, mine warfare, anti-air and anti-surface operations. McInerney earned the Navy Unit Commendation, the Combat Action Ribbon, the National Defense Service Medal, the Southwest Asia Service Medal with Bronze Star, the Kuwait Liberation Medal (Saudi Arabia) and the Kuwait Liberation Medal (Kuwait) for her wartime service.

The ship returned from the Middle East in July 1991 after escorting more than 50 merchant vessels through the mine-swept waters to Kuwait ports. Her continued, proven prowess earned her the Battle "E" for efficiency, and the COMNAVSURFLANT ASW Award, designating her as the top AN/SQQ-89-configured ASW platform on the East Coast. McInerney's humanitarian efforts, throughout her career, include assisting the tug Taurus in the Jacksonville Operating Area, transferring a wounded merchant seaman during the Tanker War, rescuing sailors from the sinking motor vessel Jenneastar in the Mediterranean and escorting merchant ships carrying needed supplies to the ports of Kuwait through mine-swept channels in the aftermath of Operation Desert Storm.

In 1999, McInerney participated in the UNITAS 40–99 deployment to South America UNITAS along with Samuel B. Roberts.

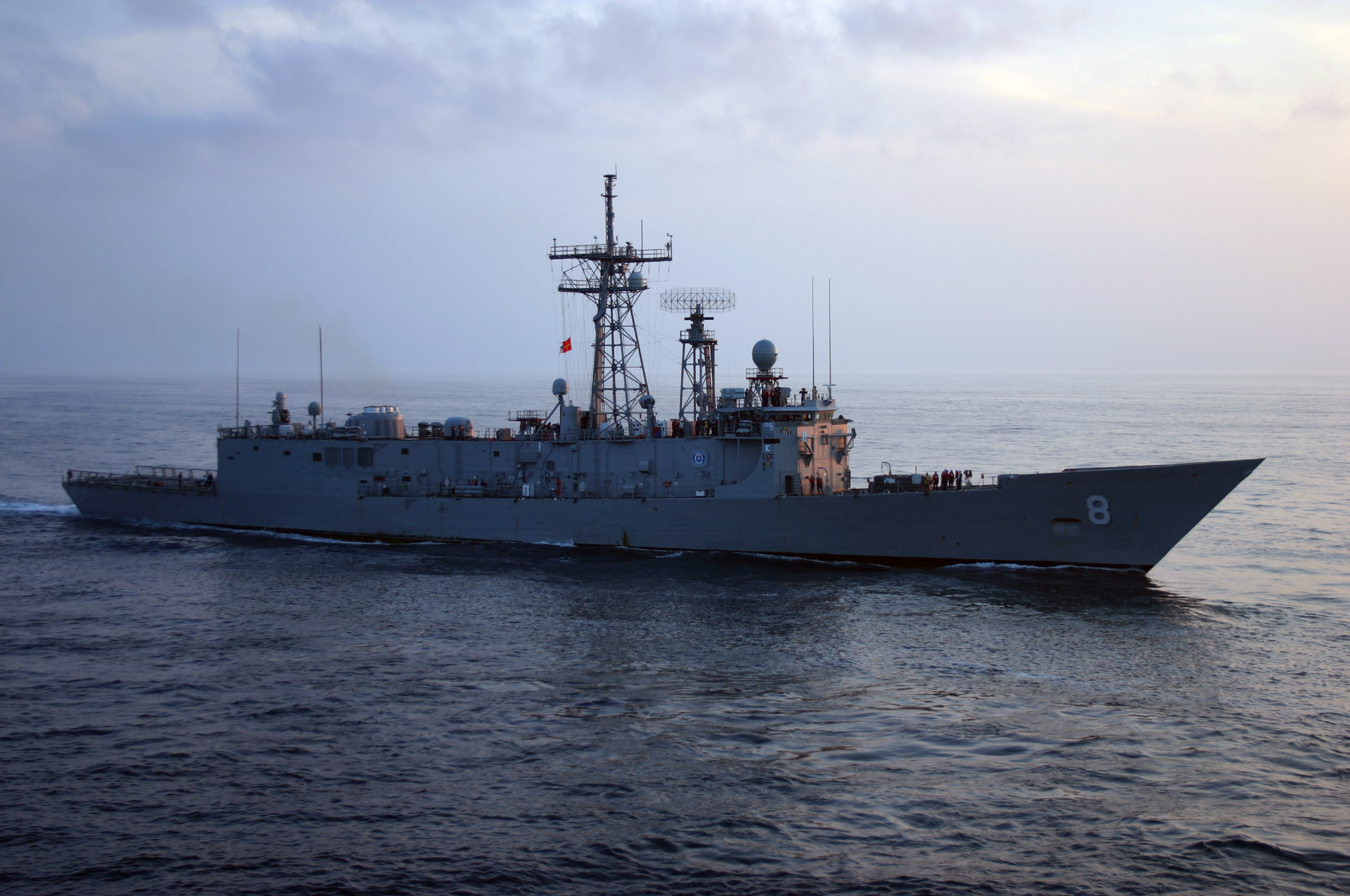
McInerney underway in the Atlantic Ocean on 8 June 2004

==== 2000s ====
McInerney completed a highly successful SOUTHCOM Counter-Drug Operations Deployment in November 2003. The highlight of the deployment was a drug bust of an Ecuadorian fishing vessel in which nearly 10 tons of cocaine were seized. For her efforts throughout the deployment, McInerney was awarded the Humanitarian Service Medal and the Coast Guard Meritorious Unit Commendation.

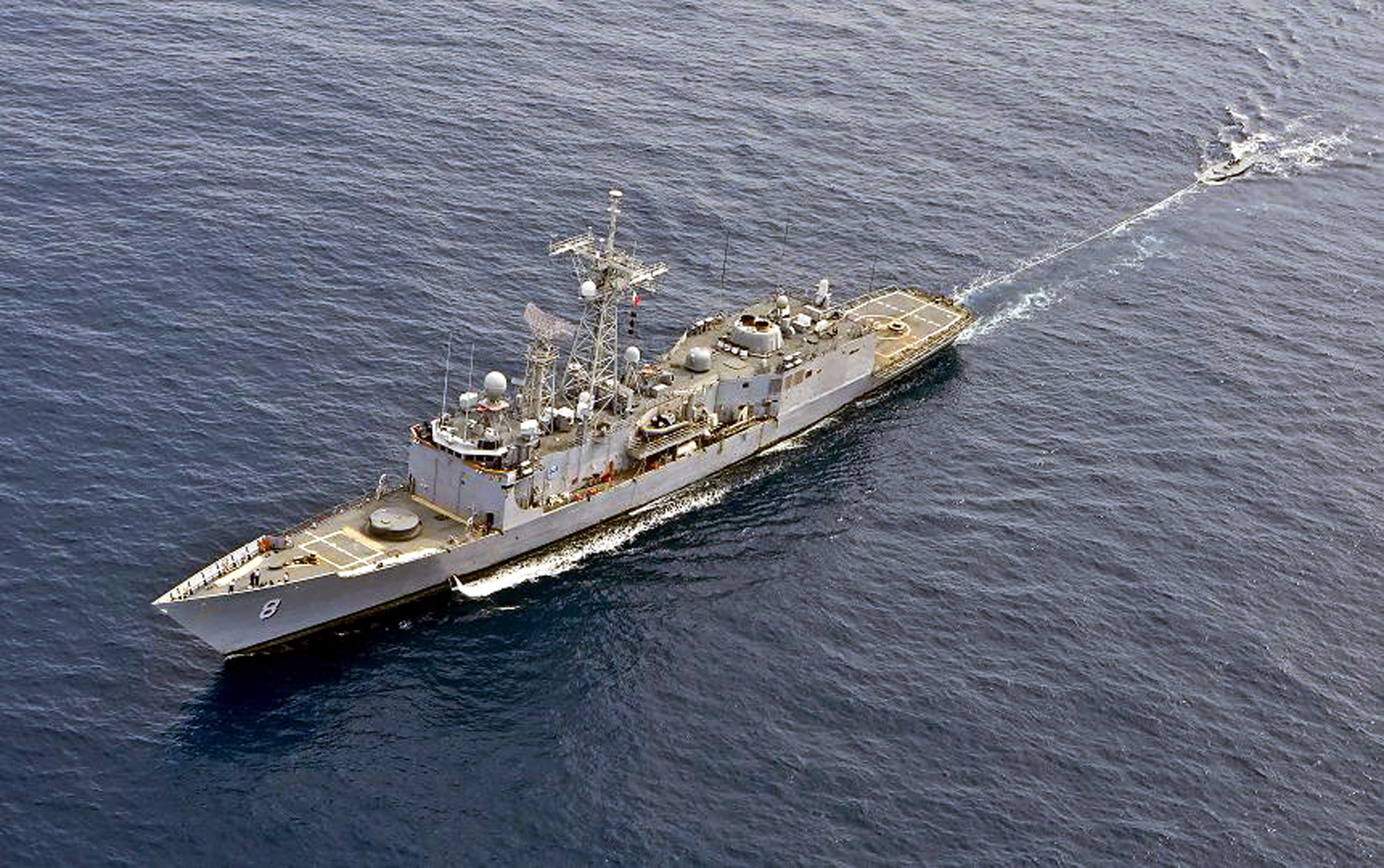
McInerney tows a self-propelled, semi-submersible craft seized,13 September 2008

On 13 September 2008, McInerney, working with Coast Guard Law Enforcement Detachment 404, intercepted a 59-foot (18 m) self-propelled semisubmersible carrying seven tons of cocaine off the coast of Guatemala. Four Colombian drug smugglers were captured aboard. The cargo had an estimated street value of $187 million.

On 5 October 2009, McInerney left Mayport Naval Station on its final deployment.

On 3 April 2010, an MQ-8 Fire Scout from McInerney helped to confiscate 60 kilograms (130 lb) of cocaine from a speedboat.

=== Service in Pakistan Navy ===
In September 2008, the United States Congress approved the transfer of the frigate to Pakistan, with a delivery date of August 2010. Citing the Foreign Assistance Act and the Arms Export Control Act, Pakistan is considered a "major non-NATO ally", able to receive older unneeded US military equipment. McInerney was decommissioned on 31 August 2010. While equipment received under "excess defence article" (EDA) is free, Pakistan was to pay for refurbishing costs.

The 32-year-old frigate, which was renamed Alamgir, was given a US$65 million refurbishment, including anti-submarine capability. Alamgir received an overhaul of almost all mechanical equipment, ranging from the overhaul of all four diesels, down to inspection and replacement of sea valves and air conditioning. A new bridge and navigational suite were installed, along with a VIP cabin and a composite dome over the overhauled AN/SQS-56 sonar array.

Pakistani personnel embarked during December 2010 and were trained to operate the vessel to the US Navy's Personnel Qualification Standard. Sea trials began in late January 2011. On 21 January, the ship collided with the pier during engine tests, resulting in damage to both the bow of the ship and pier. The goal was to sail Alamgir away on 10 February 2011. The sea trials were delayed for several weeks as repairs had to be conducted in the water due to lack of available drydock space. Ultimately, the repairs were completed on 22 February 2011 with sea trials being completed in the following weeks, departing Florida in time to reach Bermuda one month later on 24 March 2011.

On 24 March 2011, Almagir docked in the British North Atlantic territory of Bermuda.

On 18 February 2014, while operating off Oman's Masirah Island, Alamgir and the Australian frigate Melbourne intercepted and boarded a dhow found to be carrying 1,951 kilograms (4,301 lb) of cannabis resin.

Satellite imagery published during the 2025 India-Pakistan conflict by Maxar showed that PNS Alamgir was initially docked at Karachi before proceeding to Gwadar during the conflict.

== Awards ==
- Combat Action Ribbon
- Navy Unit Commendation
- Navy Meritorious Unit Commendation (1 battle star)
- CG Meritorious Unit Commendation
- Navy E Ribbon (6)
- Navy Expeditionary Medal
- National Defense Service Medal (1 battle star)
- Southwest Asia Service Medal (2 battle stars)
- Armed Forces Service Medal
- Humanitarian Service Medal
- Navy Sea Service Deployment Ribbon (4 battle stars)
- CG Special Operations Service Ribbon
- Kuwait Liberation Medal (Kuwait)

== Bibliography ==
- Wright, C. C. (1990). "Annex B: McInerney (FFG-8) Shipyard Work". Warship International. XXVII (1): 23. ISSN 0043-0374.
