= Flag Officer Sea Training (Pakistan) =

Pakistani naval training

Agency overview
- Formed: 1996
- Jurisdiction: Pakistan Navy
- Headquarters: Pakistan Navy Dockyard, West Wharf Road, Karachi, Pakistan
- Agency executive: R/ADM Khyber Zaman
- Parent department: Ministry of Defense (Government of Pakistan)
- Parent agency: Pakistan Navy

The Flag Officer Sea Training (FOST) is a Pakistan Navy training organization adapted from the Royal Navy training organization. It is responsible for ensuring that Pakistan Navy and Pakistan Fleet Auxiliary vessels are fit to join the operational fleet. The Pakistan Navy manifested the Operational Sea Training (OST) in 1989 to conduct the training of surface ships but the program was later updated to Flag Officer Sea Training (FOST) headed by a senior flag officer of Rear Admiral rank. The FOST training organization has expanded to include Sub-Surface, Aviation, Special Operations Forces and Marines (SOF&M), Ashore Training Evaluation Wings and Doctrine Development Cell.
