= Vice admiral (Pakistan) =

Second-highest rank in Pakistan navy

Vice Admiral
- Flag of Vice Admiral, Pakistan Navy

- The shoulder stars, shoulder boards, and sleeve stripes of a Pakistani Navy vice admiral of the "line".

- The star insignia of a Pakistani Navy vice admiral
- Country: Pakistan
- Service branch: Pakistan Navy; Pakistan Marines; Inter-Services Public Relations
- Abbreviation: VADM
- Rank: Three-star
- NATO rank code: OF-8
- Non-NATO rank: O-9
- Next higher rank: Admiral
- Next lower rank: Rear admiral
- Equivalent ranks: Lieutenant general (Pakistan Army); Air marshal (Pakistan Air Force)

Vice admiral (abbreviated as VADM) is a three-star commissioned armed senior flag officer rank in the Pakistan Navy, and marines awarded by the government of Pakistan to rear admirals as a position advancement in uniformed service. It is the second-highest rank in Pakistan armed services, and while it is worn on epaulettes with a three-star insignia, it ranks above the two-star rank rear admiral and below the four-star rank admiral. Vice admiral is equivalent to the rank of Lieutenant general of Pakistan Army and air marshal of the Pakistan Air Force.

Vice admiral in the Pakistan Navy is a very senior flag officer rank and is abbreviated as V/ADMPN to distinguish it from the same ranks offered in other countries, although there is no official abbreviation available for a Pakistani vice admiral. Vice admiral may be also called as three-star admiral to distinguish it from other ranks such as the two-star rear admiral and the four-star admiral.

== Appointment and promotion ==
Awarded by the Government of Pakistan to rear admirals as a position advancement in uniformed service.

== Statutory limits ==
Since it is the second-highest rank in Pakistan armed forces with high classification scale of Grade 22 coupled with additional powers and benefits, the law of Pakistan restricts the use of unsanctioned power by a three-star Admiral and can be constraint under a certain constitutional amendment.

== Gallery ==
Insignia of a three-star Marshal, Air marshal

Insignia of three-star Lieutenant general Pakistan

Discontinued shoulder and sleeve insignia of a Pakistani Air marshal
