= Asaf Humayun =

Pakistan Navy admiral

- Born: Asaf Humayun; 1952 (age 73–74); Hyderabad, Sindh, Pakistan
- Military career
- Allegiance: Pakistan
- Branch: Pakistan Navy
- Service years: 1970–2010
- Rank: Vice admiral
- Unit: Submarine Service Branch
- Commands: Vice Chief of Naval Staff; Commander, Pakistan Fleet; DG Maritime Technologies Complex
- Conflicts: Indo-Pakistani War of 1971; Indo-Pakistani War of 1999; Indo-Pakistani Standoff 2001; War in North-West Pakistan; Indo-Pakistani Standoff 2008
- Awards: Hilal-e-Imtiaz; Sitara-e-Imtiaz; Tamgha-i-Imtiaz

Asaf Humayun (Urdu: ﺁصف ہمایوں; born 1952), was a vice admiral in the Pakistan Navy who served as visiting faculty at the Bahria University in Karachi, Pakistan.

In 2008, he was notably superseded by Admiral Noman Bashir for the promotion to the four-star admiral in the Navy but was appointed as Vice Chief of Naval Staff which he served until retiring in 2009. After retirement, he joined the faculty of the Bahria University and penned columns on maritime security, Pakistan Today.

== Biography ==
Humayun was born in Hyderabad, Sindh. He completed his early education from a local school and college in Nawabshah, Sindh. In 1970, Humayun passed Higher Secondary School exam (Standing 2nd in overall merit) and also passed the entrance test to Pakistan Naval Academy, from Inter Services Selection Board Kohat. He joined Pakistan Navy in December 1970, commissioning in 1973. In 1971, Humayun served in the PNS Shushuk on the western front of the third war with India.

After the war, he completed his initial training at the Naval Academy, Karachi, and was sent to the United Kingdom where he attended the Britannia Naval College in 1973. In 1974, S/Lieutenant Humayun was qualified in additional training from the United Kingdom. He joined the Submarine Service Branch. In 1980s, Cdr Humayun held the commands of Hangor and Shushuk.

In 1986, he attended the Naval War College in Rhode Island, United States, attaining his diploma in staff course. In 1992–95, Capt Humayun was selected by the Ministry of Defence (MoD) to serve as the naval attaché at the High Commission of Pakistan in New Delhi. In 1990s, Capt. Humayun held the commands of the Tippu Sultan and Shah Jahan. In 1998, he was promoted to the one-star assignment, holding the command of the Submarine Squadron as Commodore. From 1999 to 2000, Cdre. Humayun attended the National Defence University in Islamabad, where he gained master's degree in Defence and Strategic Studies.

In 2002, Cdre Humayun was promoted to two-star while appointed as Naval Secretary NHQ. From 2002 to 2006, Rear-Admiral Humayun was appointed as Director-General of Maritime Technologies Complex (MTC) at the NeScom, where he was noted for his leadership in employing technological systems on board the naval combatant ships. In 2006, Rear-Admiral Humayun assumed the command of the Pakistan Navy Fleet (COMPAK), eventually supervising the deployment of Pakistan Navy Fleet in the Indian Ocean to ward off the Indian Navy. The same year, Rear-Admiral Humayun participated in the Exercise Sea Spark, alongside then-Rear-Admiral Noman Bashir.

In 2007, Rear-Admiral Humayun was promoted to Vice-Admiral while appointed as Fleet Commander in command of Pakistan Fleet (COMPAK). In 2007, Humayun was made Chief of Staff of the Pakistan Navy, second-in-command to the Chief of Naval Staff.

== Vice Chief of Naval Staff and retirement ==
In 2008, Vice-Admiral Humayun and Vice-Admiral Bashir were considered for promotion as four-star admiral in the Navy and being appointed as the Chief of Naval Staff, in a nomination summary sent by then-Defence Minister Ahmad Mukhtar to the Prime minister Yousaf Raza Gillani.

Vice-Admiral Humayun was superseded by Vice-Admiral Bashir as a four-star admiral for the appointment to the position of Chief of Naval Staff by Prime minister Gillani, and the Prime Minister's choice was confirmed by then-President Asif Ali Zardari.

On 30 October 2008, President Zardari appointed Vice Admiral Asaf Humayun as Vice Chief of the Naval Staff, on recommendations of Prime Minister Yousaf Raza Gillani. Humayun served as the Vice Chief of Naval Staff until 26 December 2009 and retired from the Navy after completing his term. He was succeeded by Vice Admiral Shahid Iqbal in 2009, who was appointed as Chief of Staff.

After retirement, he joined the faculty of the Bahria University and penned columns on maritime security as a maritime expert. Pakistan Today.

== See also ==
- Pakistan Navy

Military offices
Preceded by VADM Mohammad Haroon	Vice Chief of Naval Staff of Pakistan Navy; 30 October 2008 – 26 December 2009	Succeeded by VADM Shahid Iqbal
