= Tanveer Faiz =

Former vice admiral of the Pakistan Navy

Vice Admiral Tanveer Faiz SI(M)

Rector of the Bahria University
- In office 8 February 2015 – 8 February 2018
- Preceded by: Shahid Iqbal
- Succeeded by: Kaleem Shaukat

Personal details
- Citizenship: Pakistan

Military service
- Allegiance: Pakistan
- Branch/service: Pakistan Navy
- Years of service: 1975–2015
- Rank: Vice Admiral
- Unit: Naval Operations Branch
- Commands: Commander Pakistan Fleet; DCNS (Projects–II); Naval Strategic Forces Command; DG Naval Intelligence (DGNI); Military attaché at Pakistan Embassy, Beijing; ACNS (Ops)
- Battles/wars: Atlantique incident Indo-Pakistan standoff 2001; Indo-Pakistani standoff 2008; War in North-West Pakistan; India–Pakistan border skirmishes in 2015
- Awards: Sitara-i-Imtiaz (military)

Tanveer Faiz (Urdu: تنوير فیض) is a retired three-star vice admiral of the Pakistan Navy. He also served in university administration as the rector of Bahria University from 2015 until 2018.

From 2006–07, Faiz served in the Ministry of Defence (MoD) as an additional secretary where he led bilaterals diplomatic talks with Indian Army and Hydrographic Department of Government of India to seek to resolve issues involving Sir Creek and water dispute.

In 2012, Vice-Admiral Faiz was also the first commander of the naval strategic command, which is the custodian of the nation's second strike capability.

== Biography ==
Faiz attended and was educated at the Pakistan Naval Academy in 1973, and commissioned in the Navy in 1975 in the Naval Operations Branch. Sub-Lieutenant Faiz later joined the Submarine Service Branch, serving in the Hangor-class and Agosta 70A-class submarines throughout his career as junior officer in the Navy.

His war appointment included his role as commander. Faiz commanded two submarines and a Guided missile destroyer as a captain. In addition, he also commanded the submarine squadron as part of his war assignment.

In the 1980s–90s, he attended and graduated from the Naval War College in Lahore where he attained MSc in Defence studies and later attended and graduated from the National Defence University in Islamabad, graduated with an MS in War studies.

In the 1990s, Captain Faiz was selected by the Ministry of Defence (MoD) to be served as the naval attaché, and was posted at the Pakistan Embassy in Beijing, China. Cdre Faiz also served in the Naval Intelligence, eventually becoming its director-general in the 2000s, before being appointed as ACNS (Ops) at the Navy NHQ in Islamabad.

In 2006, Cdre. Faiz was promoted to two-star assignment but remained posted as ACNS (Ops) at the Navy NHQ.

In 2006, Rear-Admiral Faiz was posted in the Ministry of Defence as an Additional Secretary (Add. Secy) to the Defence Secretary of Pakistan. On 22/23 December 2006, RAdm Faiz held meeting with Rear-Admiral B.R. Rao, the Chief Hydrographer of Indian government, over the issue of Sir creek to discuss the boundaries of disputed areas. RAdm Faiz headed the delegation that held talks with Surveyor General of India, Major-General M. Gopal Rao of Indian Army, to begin talks in nearby Rawalpindi to resolve the dispute over Sir Creek, a marshy estuary off the Gujarat coast, whose determination would enable both countries to finalise maritime boundaries.

In 2009, RAdm Faiz took over the command of the Pakistan Fleet (COMPAK) as its senior fleet commander. In 2010, he was promoted to three-star rank, Vice-Admiral in the Navy. In 2010, Vice-Admiral Faiz commissioned the Harbin Z-9 helicopters in the Naval Aviation, and the third F-22P Zulfikar-class frigate . In 2011, Vice-Admiral Faiz was in the race of being promoted as four-star admiral in the Navy. and to be appointed as Chief of Naval Staff, but it was Admiral Sandila who was the most senior, promoted to four-star appointment.

In 2012, Vice-Admiral Faiz was appointed as first commander of the Naval Strategic Forces Command (NSFCOM) which is described as the custodian of the nation's second strike capability.

About the role of the NSFCOM, Vice-Admiral Faiz reportedly highlighted the role and objectives of his command by stating: The Force, which is the custodian of the nation's second-strike capability, will strengthen Pakistan's policy of Credible Minimum Deterrence and ensure regional stability.

After retiring from Navy in 2015, Vice-Admiral Faiz was appointed Rector of the Bahria University on 8 February 2015, after taking over from Vice-Admiral (retd) Shahid Iqbal.
