= Faisal Rasul Lodhi =

Pakistan navy vice admiral

- Education: Pakistan Naval War College; National Defence University
- Military career
- Allegiance: Pakistan
- Branch: Pakistan Navy
- Service years: 1986–Present(LPR)
- Rank: , Vice admiral
- Commands: Vice Chief of Naval Staff, NHQ). Chief of Staff (COS), NHQ; Commander Karachi Coast(COMKAR). Flag Officer Sea Training (FOST); DCNS (Operations) (DCNS-O), Director Staff Pakistan Naval War College. Director naval warfare&operational plan. liaison officer, U.S. Central Command; Additional Secretary-III (Navy) at Ministry of Defence (AS-III MoD), Director Pak Navy Tactical School, OTC PNS Tariq (D-181)
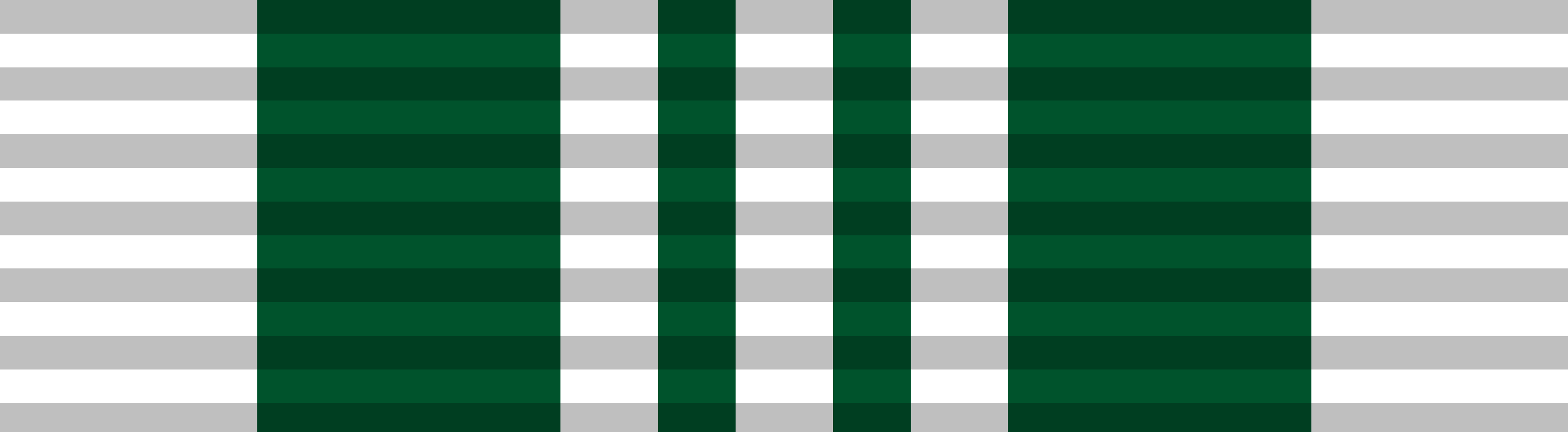
- Awards: Hilal-e-Imtiaz (Military) Sitara-e-Imtiaz (Military) Tamgha-e-Imtiaz (Military)

Faisal Rasul Lodhi is a retired three star Admiral of the Pakistan Navy. Served as Commander Karachi (Comkar), he took the office in October 2020 until March 2021 following the appointment of Ovais Ahmed Bilgrami. During his last assignment, he commanded all Pakistan Navy establishments and training units at Karachi division. He also served as Vice Chief of the Naval Staff at Naval Headquarters in Islamabad.

== Career ==
He joined the Pakistan Navy in 1982 and got commission in Operations Branch in 1986. Prior to his Commander Karachi assignment, he served as commander coast. He was also appointed to active lead ships such as commanding officer of PNS Tariq (D-181) besides serving at Director Pakistan Navy Tactical School, and Flag Officer Sea Training. At staff appointments, he served as a director staff at the Navy War College, director naval warfare and operational plans at Islamabad. He was also appointed as fleet operation officer and chief staff officer to Commander Pakistan Fleet and liaison officer to the US Centcom besides serving to Naval Secretary and Vice Chief of the Naval Staff headquartered in Islamabad. In Minister of Defence, at was appointed as Additional Secretary-III. He graduated from the Pakistan Naval War College and National Defence University. He obtained professional courses from Philippines besides obtaining a master's degree in international security and strategic studies from the UK.

== Awards and decorations ==

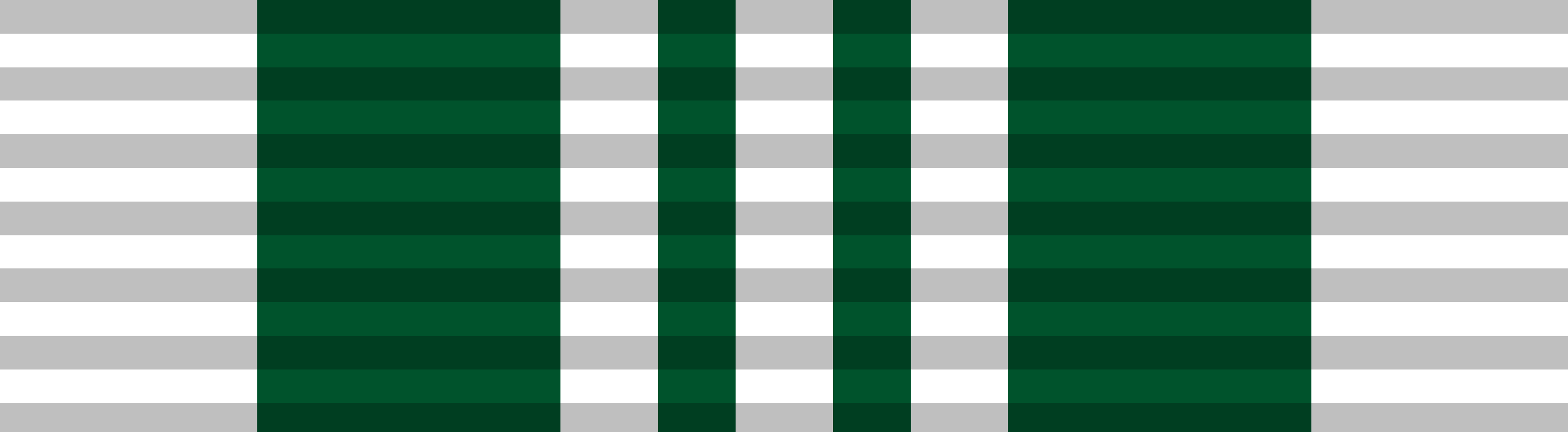

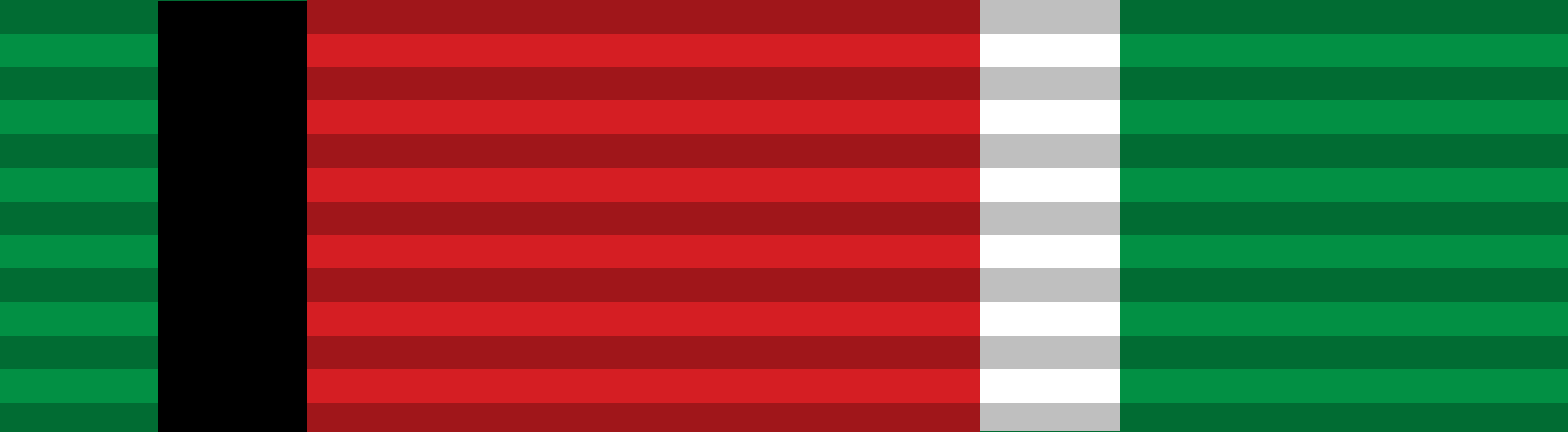

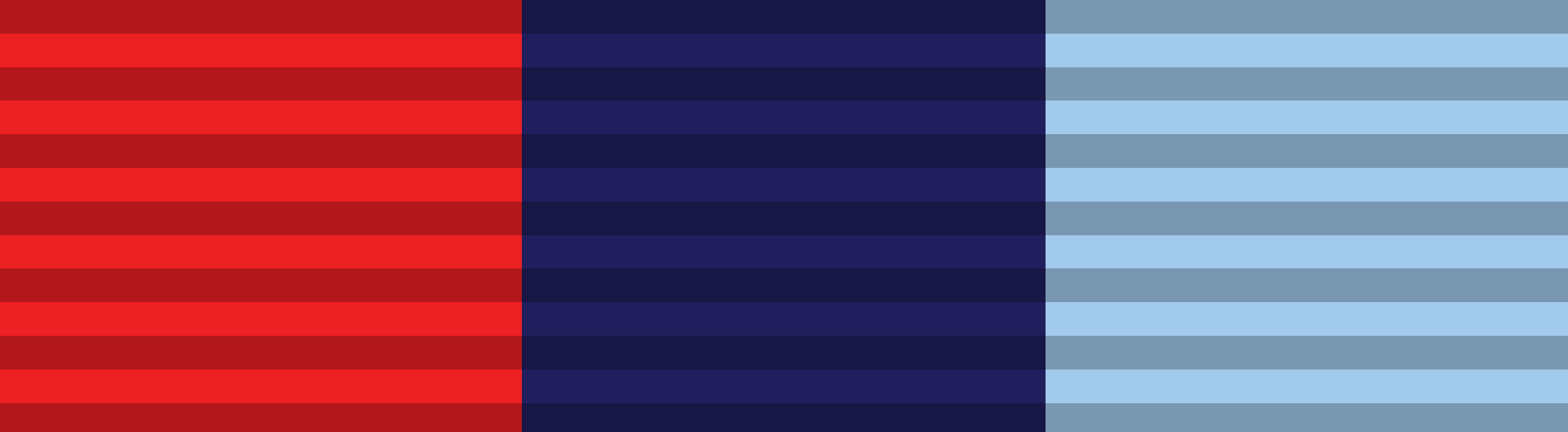

	Hilal-e-Imtiaz (Military) (Crescent of Excellence)	Sitara-e-Imtiaz (Military) (Star of Excellence)	
Tamgha-e-Imtiaz (Military) (Medal of Excellence)	Tamgha-e-Baqa (Nuclear Test Medal) 1998	Tamgha-e-Istaqlal Pakistan (Escalation with India Medal) 2002	Tamgha-e-Azm (Medal of Conviction) (2018)
10 Years Service Medal	20 Years Service Medal	30 Years Service Medal	35 Years Service Medal
40 Years Service Medal	Jamhuriat Tamgha (Democracy Medal) 1988	Qarardad-e-Pakistan Tamgha (Resolution Day Golden Jubilee Medal) 1990	Tamgha-e-Salgirah Pakistan (Independence Day Golden Jubilee Medal) 1997

== Effective Dates of promotion ==
Insignia	Rank	Date
	Vice Admiral (VCNS)	February 2020 to March 2023
	Rear Admiral	March 2016
	Commodore	September 2012
	Captain	July 2008
	Commander	May 2003
	Lieutenant commander	April 1996
	Lieutenant	May 1989
	Sub Lieutenant	June 1987
	Midshipman	June 1986
