= Strategic Forces Command (disambiguation) =

The Strategic Forces Command is responsible for the management and administration of India's tactical and strategic nuclear weapons stockpile.

Strategic Forces Command may also refer to:

- Army Strategic Forces Command (Pakistan), Pakistan Army
- Naval Strategic Forces Command (Pakistan), Pakistan Navy
- Air Force Strategic Command (Pakistan), Pakistan Air Force
