= Kaleem Shaukat =

Former Pakistani naval officer

Vice Admiral Kaleem Shaukat HI(M) SI(M)
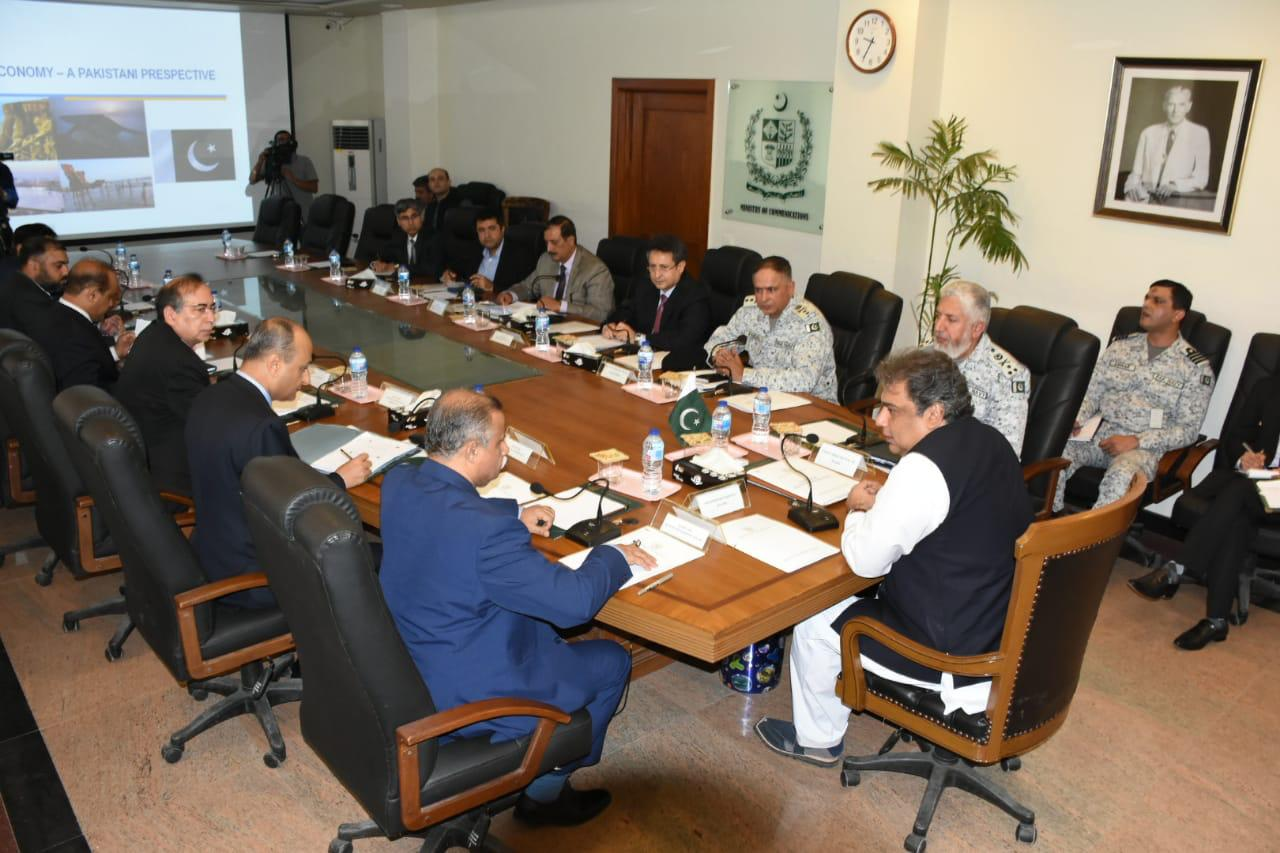
- Kaleem (first from right side of the table)
- Born: Pakistan
- Military career
- Allegiance: Pakistan
- Branch: Pakistan Navy
- Service years: 1980–2019
- Rank: Vice Admiral
- Unit: Naval Operations Branch
- Commands: Vice-Chief of Naval Staff; Commander Pakistan Fleet; Combined Task Force 151; DCNS (Projects); DCNS (Operations); Navy Punjab Command; Naval War College
- Conflicts: 2008 Indo-Pakistan standoff Piracy off the coast of Somalia; Piracy in the Persian Gulf; Piracy High Risk Area around the Horn of Africa; Operation Enduring Freedom–HOA
- Awards: Hilal-e-Imtiaz (Military); Sitara-e-Imtiaz (Military)
- Other work: Rector Bahria University

Kaleem Shaukat HI(M) SI(M) (Urdu: كليم شوكت) is a former Pakistani naval officer and vice admiral in the Pakistan Navy, served as the vice chief of naval staff from 2017 to November 2019. Kaleem retired from the naval uniform service in 2019 after succeeding Fayyaz Gilani as VCNS. He also served as Rector Bahria University .

== Biography ==
Kaleem Shaukat joined the Pakistan Navy in 1980, and was directed to attend the Britannia Royal Naval College in England where he did his initial military training as a surface officer and passed out in 1982. He gained commissioned as Sub-Lieutenant and served as an executive officer in the surface warship.

He is a graduate of the National Defence University in Islamabad, and Armed Forces College in Turkey. Capt. Shaukat served as a commanding officer while commanding the Tariq-class warships in 2000s. In addition, he also served in the faculty of Naval War College in Lahore, and commanded the 25th Destroyer Squadron.

In 2009, Cdre. Shaukat took the command of the Punjab Command, and was conferred with a gallantry award for his services. His career in the Navy is mostly served in the Middle East, having commanding the Pakistan Armed Forces-Middle East based in Qatar in 2010-12.

In 2012, Cdre. Shaukat was promoted to the two-star rank admiral, and took over the command of the CTF 151. At the Navy NHQ, he other command appointment included his role as DCNS (Projects), and Director of Naval Warfare Directorate.

On March 2, 2017, R-Adm. took over the command of the Pakistan Fleet from Vice-Admiral S.A. Hussaini, and was eventually promoted to the three-star rank.

In October 2017, V-Adm. Shaukat was moved at the Navy NHQ, and was appointed as the DCNS (Operations) before elevated as the Vice-Chief of Naval Staff on 3 December 2017.

On 16 November 2019, Vice-Admiral Kaleem Shaukat retired from his military service, completing his 39-year of military service with the Navy, and was succeeded by Vice-Admiral Fayyaz Gilani as vice naval chief.

== Awards and decorations ==

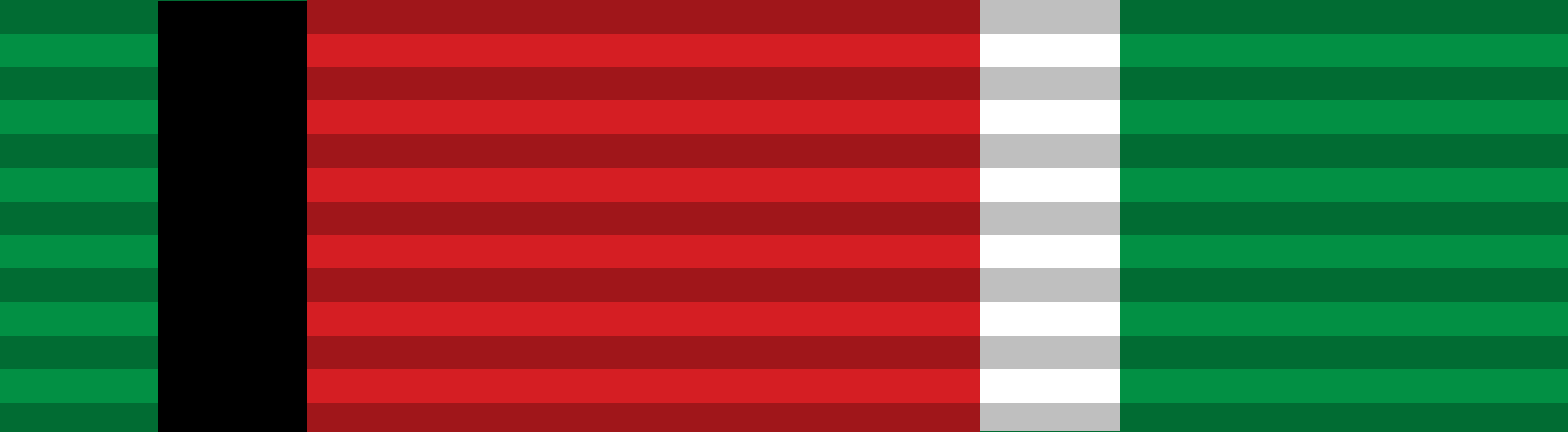

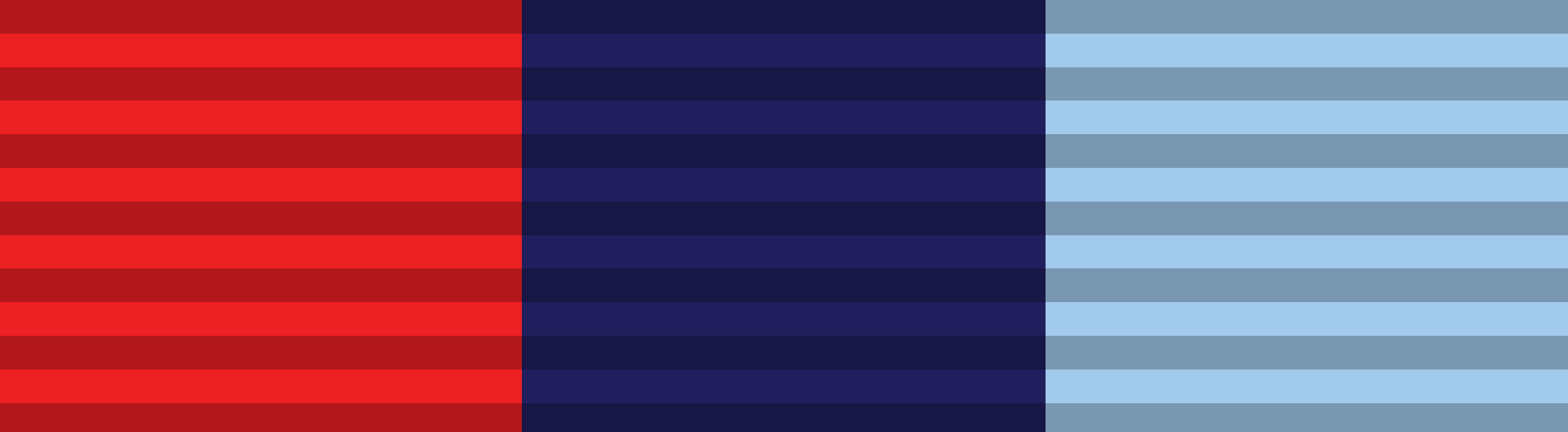

Hilal-e-Imtiaz (Military) (Crescent of Excellence)		Sitara-e-Imtiaz (Military) (Star of Excellence)	
Tamgha-e-Baqa (Nuclear Test Medal) 1998	Tamgha-e-Istaqlal Pakistan (Escalation with India Medal) 2002	Tamgha-e-Azm (Medal of Conviction) (2018)	10 Years Service Medal
20 Years Service Medal	30 Years Service Medal	35 Years Service Medal	40 Years Service Medal
Hijri Tamgha (Hijri Medal) 1979	Jamhuriat Tamgha (Democracy Medal) 1988	Qarardad-e-Pakistan Tamgha (Resolution Day Golden Jubilee Medal) 1990	Tamgha-e-Salgirah Pakistan (Independence Day Golden Jubilee Medal) 1997

== See also ==
- Pakistan Navy
