= Ahmed Saeed =

Ahmed Saeed may refer to:

- Ahmed Saeed (actor), Maldivian film actor
- Ahmed Saeed (footballer, born 1980), Maldivian footballer
- Ahmed Saeed (footballer, born 1989), Sudanese footballer
- Ahmed Saeed (admiral), admiral in the Pakistan Navy

== See also ==
- Ahmad Saeed, former chairman of Pakistan International Airlines and Zarai Taraqiati Bank Limited
- Saeed Ahmed (disambiguation)
