= PNS Shushuk =

PNS Shushuk is the name of the following ships of the Pakistan Navy, named for the Shushuk dolphin:

- PNS Shushuk (S132), a Daphné-class submarine in commission 1970–2006
- PNS Shushuk (2025), a Hangor-class submarine launched in 2025
