= Saeed Ahmed =

Saeed Ahmed may refer to:

- Saeed Ahmed (footballer) (born 1990), Pakistani footballer
- Saeed Ahmed Abdulla (born 1994), Emirati footballer
- Saeed Ahmed (cricketer) (1937-2024), Pakistani Test cricketer
- Saeed Ahmad Khan (1900–1996), Pakistani Ahmadiyya Emir
- Saeed Ahmad Akhtar (1933–2013), Pakistani Urdu poet
- Saeed Ahmad Bodla (born 1944), Pakistani artist
- Saeed Ahmad Palanpuri (1940–2020), Indian Islamic scholar

== See also ==
- Ahmad (disambiguation)
- Ahmed
- Saeed
- Ahmed Saeed (disambiguation)
