= Shah Sohail Masood =

Pakistan Navy vice admiral

- Born: August 1960 (age 66); Larkana, Sindh, Pakistan
- Military career
- Allegiance: Pakistan
- Branch: Pakistan Navy
- Service years: 1981–2018
- Rank: Vice admiral
- Awards: Sitara-i-Imtiaz
- Other work: Bahria Foundation (Managing director)

Shah Sohail Masood (Urdu: شاہ سہیل مسعود) is a retired vice admiral and navigator of the Pakistan Navy, serving as Managing director of Bahria Foundation since 2018. As a naval commander, he served at the Naval Staff Strategic Forces Command, commanding officer of PNS Hangor, including armed units such as Squadron (COMSUBS) and Pakistan Navy Northern Command.

From 1990 to 1993, he was assigned to onboard submarines and combatant ships, including Royal Saudi Navy where he served on deputation.

== Education ==
Masood received his initial education from the Cadet College at Larkana, and later he gained a Master of Arts degree in strategic studies. After completing his postsecondary education, he graduated from the Pakistan Naval War College. Later, he attended the Pakistan National Defence University for armed force war courses.

== Career ==
Masood was born at Larkana, Sindh in August 1960. He entered in Pakistan navy department in 1979, and was commissioned in 1981. He served at various posts, including staff assignments such as directing staff for Pakistan Naval War College and its director for plans. He also served as Assistant chief of naval staff for training, plans and operations. Masood was later appointed as deputy naval secretary and director-general at Pakistan Naval Intelligence. Admiral Sohail was later appointed to the additional secretary-III at Ministry of Defence, and before he retired from the naval department, he served at Naval Strategic Force Command as a commander.
