= Leslie Mungavin =

Pakistani navy admiral and diplomat

Leslie Mungavin SPk SK SBt

Chairman Pakistan National Shipping Corporation
- In office 3 April 1978 – April 1980

3rd Vice Chief of the Naval Staff Pakistan Navy
- In office 23 March 1975 – 1977
- Preceded by: Mohammad Shariff
- Succeeded by: Karamat Rahman Niazi

Personal details
- Born: Leslie Norman Mungavin; 22 March 1925 Bombay, British India
- Died: June 1995 (aged 70) Wandsworth, London, England
- Resting place: Arabian Sea
- Spouse: Joy Beatrix
- Education: Barnes High School
- Nicknames: Jack; Munga Khan

Military service
- Allegiance: Pakistan
- Branch/service: Royal Indian Navy (1945–1947); Pakistan Navy (1947–1980)
- Years of service: 1945—1980
- Rank: Rear Admiral
- Unit: Naval Operations Branch
- Commands: Vice Chief of Naval Staff; Naval attaché, Pakistan Embassy, London; Cmdnt Pakistan Marines
- Battles/wars: Indo-Pakistani war of 1965; Indo-Pakistani war of 1971
- Awards: Sitara-i-Pakistan; Sitara-i-Khidmat; Sitara-i-Basalat

Leslie Norman Mungavin SPk SK SBt (22 March 1925 – June 1995), known as "Jack" was an Irish two-star rank admiral in the Pakistan Navy, and a defence diplomat. He is best known for leaving his diplomatic post at the Pakistani High Commission in London to command combat units during the 1971 war with India.

He also served as Vice Chief of the Naval Staff from 1975 until 1977, with a two-star rank despite the position is required an admiral to be promoted in three-star rank, the Vice-Admiral.

== Family and early life ==
Leslie Norman Mungavin was born in Bombay (now Mumbai) on 22 March 1925 into a family of Irish descent. His great great grandfather, James Mungavin, was born in Castleconnel, Ireland and is said to have emigrated from County Clare to India in 1825 to work on the railways during British colonial rule.

The Mungavin family settled in the British Raj and became part of the Anglo-Indian Christian community. Leslie’s father was George Leslie Coltman Mungavin, who continued in the railway service. Leslie was one of seven siblings.

He attended Barnes High School in Deolali, where he was the Head boy.

After the Partition of India in 1947, his family members emigrated back to the United Kingdom. Leslie, however, chose to remain and joined the newly formed Pakistan Navy.

== Military career ==
Leslie Mungavin joined the Royal Indian Navy in 1945 and transferred to the Royal Pakistan Navy after the partition in 1947, where his career in the navy progressed well till his retirement as VIce Chief of Naval Staff at the rank of Rear Admiral. On 4 November 1947, he was promoted to Sub-Lieutenant and assigned to the naval base PNS Attock.

He specialized in navigation at the training establishment HMS Dryad in the United Kingdom. In 1950s, he commanded PNS Alamgir and the Pakistan Navy flagship PNS Babur.

In July 1964 he was promoted to acting captain, serving as an Executive Branch officer specializing in Navigation and Direction. Commander Mungavin was the commanding officer of PNS Babur, and participated in the second war with India in 1965. In 1970, Cdre. Mungavin was posted as Military and Naval Attaché at the High Commission of Pakistan in London, where his services and negotiation skills merited him a Sitara-e-Pakistan award.

=== 1971 war with India ===
in 1971, Cdre. Mungavin left his assignment, only to be promoted as Rear-Admiral, and took up the command as Commandant of the Pakistan Marines which he led in the Western Front of the Indo-Pakistani war against India in 1971. Mungavin was often praised for his impressive adaptability.

During the 1971 war, Mungavin oversaw the deployment of the Pakistan Marines in both East and West Pakistan, including riverine and coastal defence operations to counter the Indian Army in Chittagong and Khulna. Mungavin and his marines conducted riverine warfare against the invading Indian Army. Mungavin was captured at the liberation of Chittagong and held as a prisoner of war until repatriation. Mungavin was awarded the Sitara-i-Basalat for his valor in the 1971 war.

=== Post war ===
In the 1970s, he was elevated as the vice chief of naval staff from 1975 until 1977, with a two-star rank despite the position is required an admiral to be promoted in three-star rank, the Vice-Admiral. In the 1980s, Rear Admiral Mungavin was also involved with the negotiations with the US Department of State when the Pakistan Navy was interested in replacing their aging fleet with Gearing-class destroyers.

From 3 April 1978 to April 1980 he served as the Chairman of the Board of the Pakistan National Shipping Corporation.

After his retirement, Mungavin suffered a stroke in his final years and was left virtually paralysed.

== Death ==
Leslie Norman Mungavin died in June 1995 at his flat in Wandsworth, London, England. At his request, his body was cremated, ashes were taken back to Pakistan and spread in the Arabian Sea. The Pakistan Navy honored him with a full military funeral, and his ashes were taken out to sea on board the PNS Babur and scattered there.

He and his wife Joy Beatrix had one daughter, Lesley Cordelia Mungavin.
