= Shahid Iqbal =

Pakistan Navy admiral

Vice Admiral Shahid Iqbal HI(M)
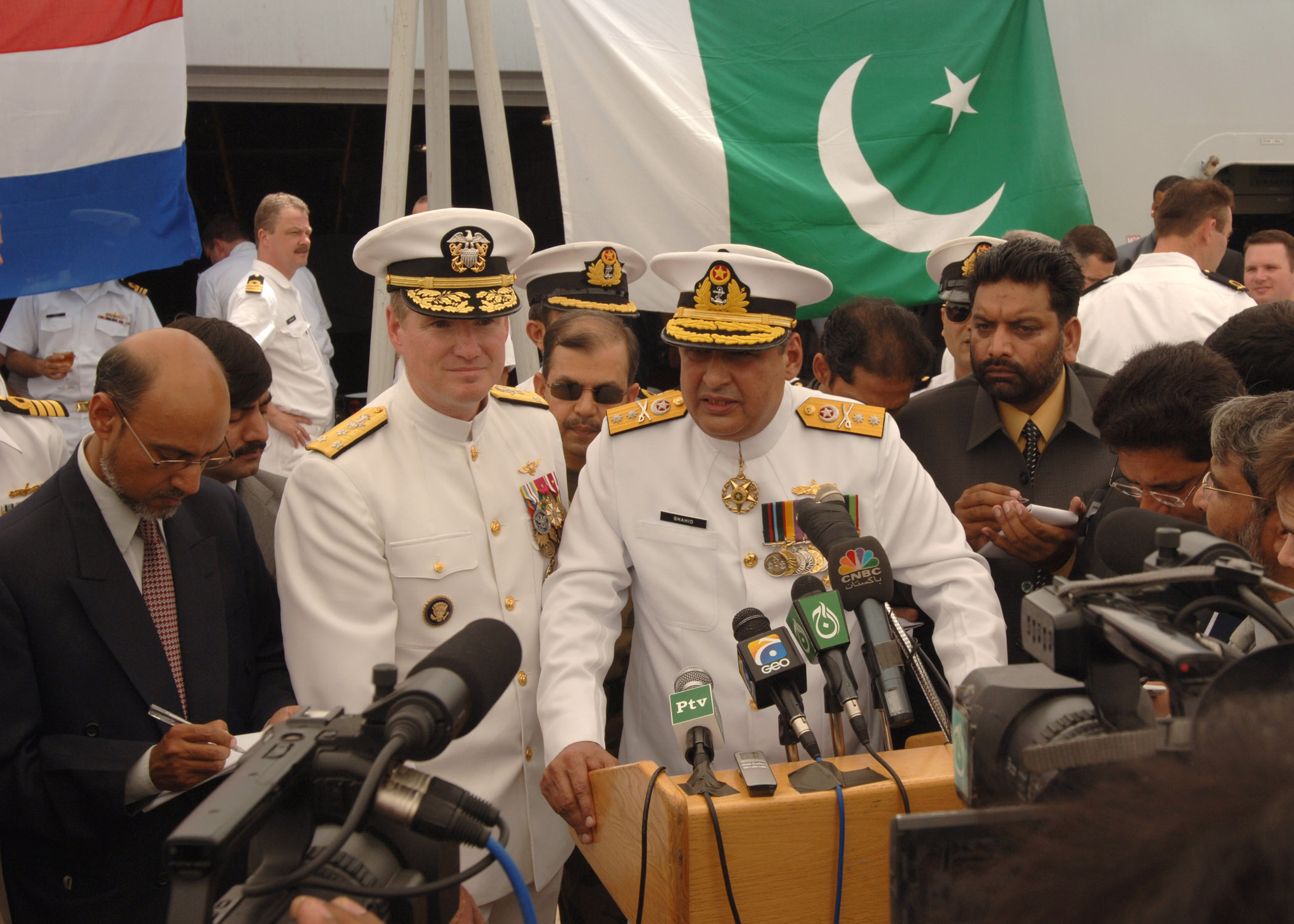
- Admiral Shahid Iqbal (right) speaking with media. ca. 2006.

Rector of the Bahria University
- In office 7 February 2012 – 8 February 2015
- Succeeded by: Tanveer Faiz

Personal details
- Born: Shahid Iqbal; July 15, 1953 (age 73) Multan, Punjab, Pakistan
- Citizenship: Pakistan

Military service
- Allegiance: Pakistan
- Branch/service: Pakistan Navy
- Years of service: 1972–2010
- Rank: Vice Admiral
- Unit: Naval Operations Branch
- Commands: VCNS at NHQ; Commander Pakistan Fleet; Combined Task Force 150; Combined Task Force 151; DCNS (Operations); DCNS of (Training and Personnel); ACNS (Ops); DG Naval Intelligence (DGNI)
- Battles/wars: Indo-Pakistan standoff 2001; Piracy off the coast of Somalia
- Awards: Hilal-e-Imtiaz (military)

Shahid Iqbal (Urdu: شاہد اقبال; born 15 July 1953), HI(M), is a retired three-star rank admiral in the Pakistan Navy, and former university administrator who served as the Rector of the Bahria University from 2012 until 2015.

In 2005, he was notable for being the first admiral in the Pakistan Navy when he took over the command of the Combined Task Force 150, helping to conduct military operations against the Somali pirates operating in the coast of Somalia. He took over this post from retiring Vice Admiral Asaf Humayun on 30 December 2009. From 2009 to 2010, Vice-Admiral Iqbal served as the Chief of Staff (now known as Vice Chief of Naval Staff) at NHQ.

== Biography ==
Shahid Iqbal was born on 5 July 1953, and was educated at the Cadet College Petaro in 1966, graduating in 1971. He joined the Pakistan Navy in 1972 and attended the Pakistan Naval Academy in Karachi where he graduated in 1974 with a degree in operations research, gaining commission in the Navy as Sub-Lieutenant in the Naval Operations Branch. He was trained as a surface warfare officer and served in the various surface warships before being selected to continue his military training in the United Kingdom.

In 1978, Lt. Iqbal was sent to United Kingdom where he did his military training at HMS Collingwood in England, specialized as Principal warfare officer with the Officer Corps of the Royal Navy.

In addition, he attended and graduated from the Turkish Staff College and Naval War College in Lahore, gaining his staff course degree. He also attended the National Defence University in Islamabad where gained his MSc in War Studies. He also served in the faculty of the Naval War College, instructing courses on war studies.

His career in the Navy mostly spent in the Naval Intelligence (Nav Intel), eventually headed the Naval Intelligence in 2000s as its Director-General. From 2001 to 2005, Cdre. Iqbal headed the Naval Intelligence, and was eventually promoted as two-star assignment.

On 24 April 2006, RAdm Iqbal was appointed to command the Combined Task Force 150 at the NAVCENT in Bahrain when he relieved Dutch Commodore Hank Ort and assumed command of the Force.

On 22 August 2006, RAdm Iqbal was relieved by German Rear Admiral Heinrich Lange, and returned to Pakistan. RAdm Iqbal was noted for being the first Asian admiral of a "regional nation" who was given command of any of the three coalition task forces that comprise the Combined Maritime Force.

In 2007, RAdm Iqbal was appointed at the Navy NHQ in Islamabad and was later appointed as DCNS (Operations). In 2008, Rear-Admiral Iqbal became the senior fleet commander when he took over the command as Commander Pakistan Fleet (COMPAK) from Admiral Noman Bashir. Rear-Admiral Iqbal guided the fleet to be part of the Combined Task Force 150 and Combined Task Force 151 to launched operations against the piracy in the coast of Somalia.

In 2009, he was promoted to three-star rank, and was again posted in the Navy NHQ as DCNS (Training). Vice-Admiral Iqbal was then appointed as Chief of Staff (now known as Vice Chief of Naval Staff) at NHQ, and took over the post from Vice-Admiral Asaf Humayun who was appointed as VCNS. In 2010, VAdm Iqbal took retirement from the Navy and was subsequently preceded by Vice-Admiral Asif Sandila as VCNS.

After his retirement in 2010, he joined the university administration of the Bahria University and was eventually appointed its Rector on 8 February 2012.

== See also ==
- Piracy off the coast of Somalia
- Cadet College Petaro
- NAVCENT
- Naval Intelligence

Military offices
Preceded by VADM Asaf Humayun	Vice Chief of Naval Staff; 30 December 2009 – August 12, 2010	Succeeded by ADM Asif Sandila
