= Bahria University =

University with three campuses in Pakistan

- جامعہ بحریہ
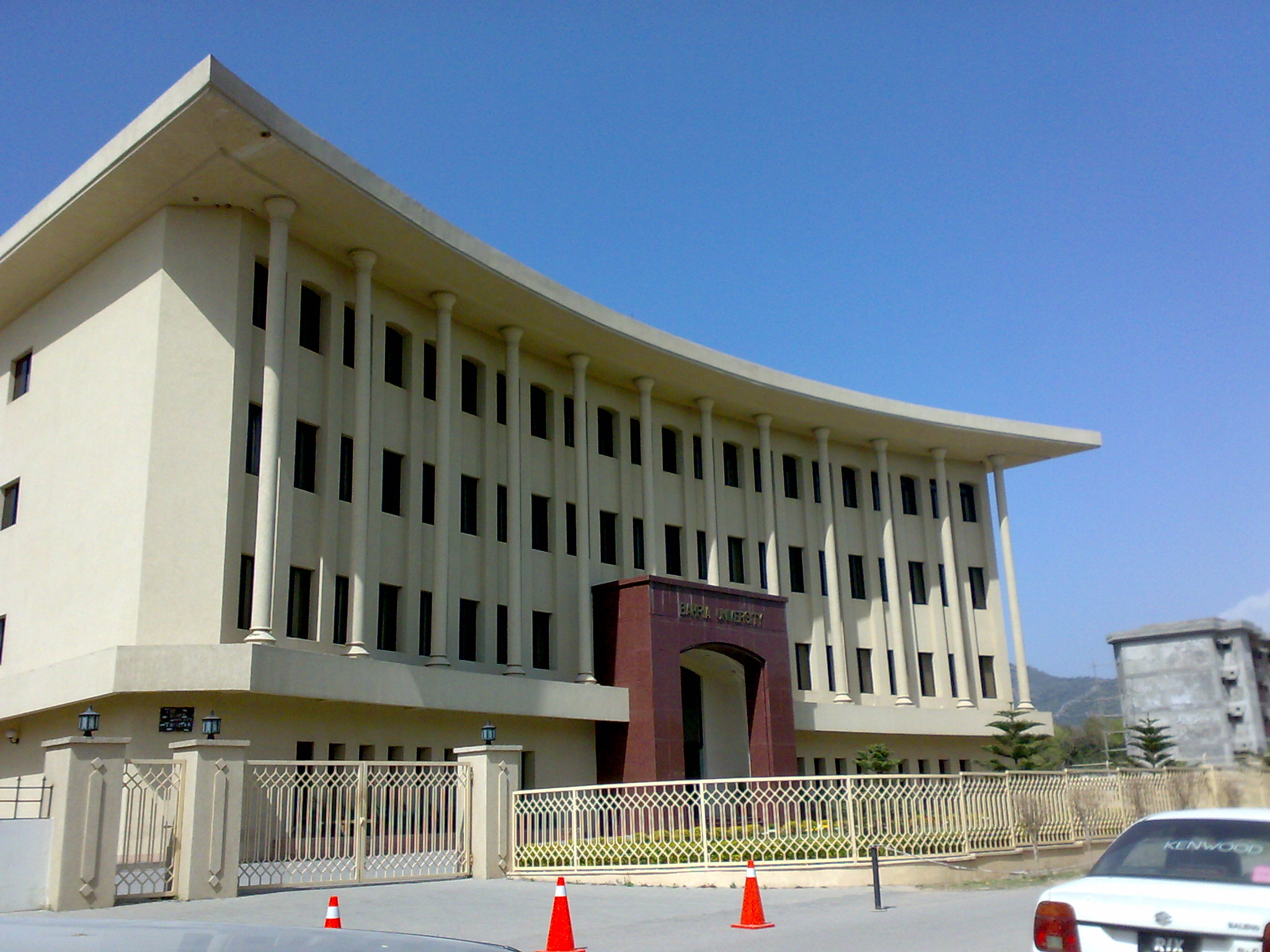
- Bahria University Headquarters, Islamabad
- Motto in English: Discovering Knowledge
- Type: Public
- Established: 2000; 26 years ago
- Accreditation: HEC, PEC, PMDC, ACU, PNC, NCEAC, NBEAC, PBC, Washington Accord
- Rector: Abid Hameed
- Students: 21000+
- Undergraduates: 8050+
- Postgraduates: 2000+
- Location: Islamabad, Pakistan; 33.717°N 73.029°E
- Campus: Urban area
- Colours: Navy, white
- Mascot: Anchor
- Website: www.bahria.edu.pk

Bahria University (BU; Urdu: جامعہ بحریہ) is a public-sector university established in 2000 by the Pakistan Navy at Shangrilla Road, Sector E-8/1 in Islamabad, Pakistan. The university maintains campuses in Karachi, Islamabad, and Lahore.

Established by the Pakistan Navy in 2000, its status is semi-government. It offers programs in undergraduate, post-graduate, and doctoral studies. Its research is directed towards the development of engineering, philosophy, natural, social, and medical sciences. Bahria University has multidisciplinary programs that include Health Sciences, Engineering Sciences, Computer Sciences, Management Sciences, Social Sciences, Law, Earth and Environmental Sciences, Psychology and Maritime Studies. The university is a member of the Association of Commonwealth Universities of the United Kingdom.

The university research institutes offer scientific research in the development of medical, environmental, natural sciences as well as in engineering and philosophy. Bahria University is a founder member of the Education Futures Collaboration charity, an international network of educators working on strategies to bridge the research/practice/policy-making divide.

== History ==
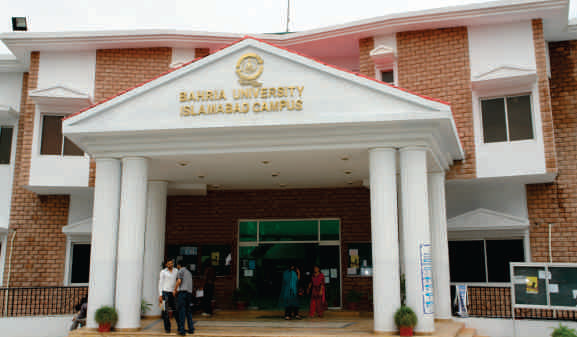
Bahria University Islamabad campus

Bahria University has its genesis in Bahria Colleges and Bahria Institutes of Management and Computer Sciences which were established by the Pakistan Navy in the 1980s and 1990s in Islamabad and Karachi. These institutes and colleges were affiliated with Peshawar University to conduct bachelor and master's degree programs in the disciplines of business management and computer sciences.

The growth and policies of the university are governed by its board of governors, comprising senior naval officers and representatives of the Ministry of Finance, the Ministry of Education, and the Higher Education Commission of Pakistan. The Chief of the Naval Staff is the chairman of the board of governors as well as pro-chancellor of the university.

It is ranked by Times Higher Education Rankings as among the leading top 250 universities under the age of 50, as among top 400 in Asia and among top 601-800 globally in the field of engineering & technology, business, computer sciences and social sciences.

QS World Rankings ranks Bahria among the top 450 universities in Asia and among top 701-720 in the world in computer science and information systems.

== Campuses ==
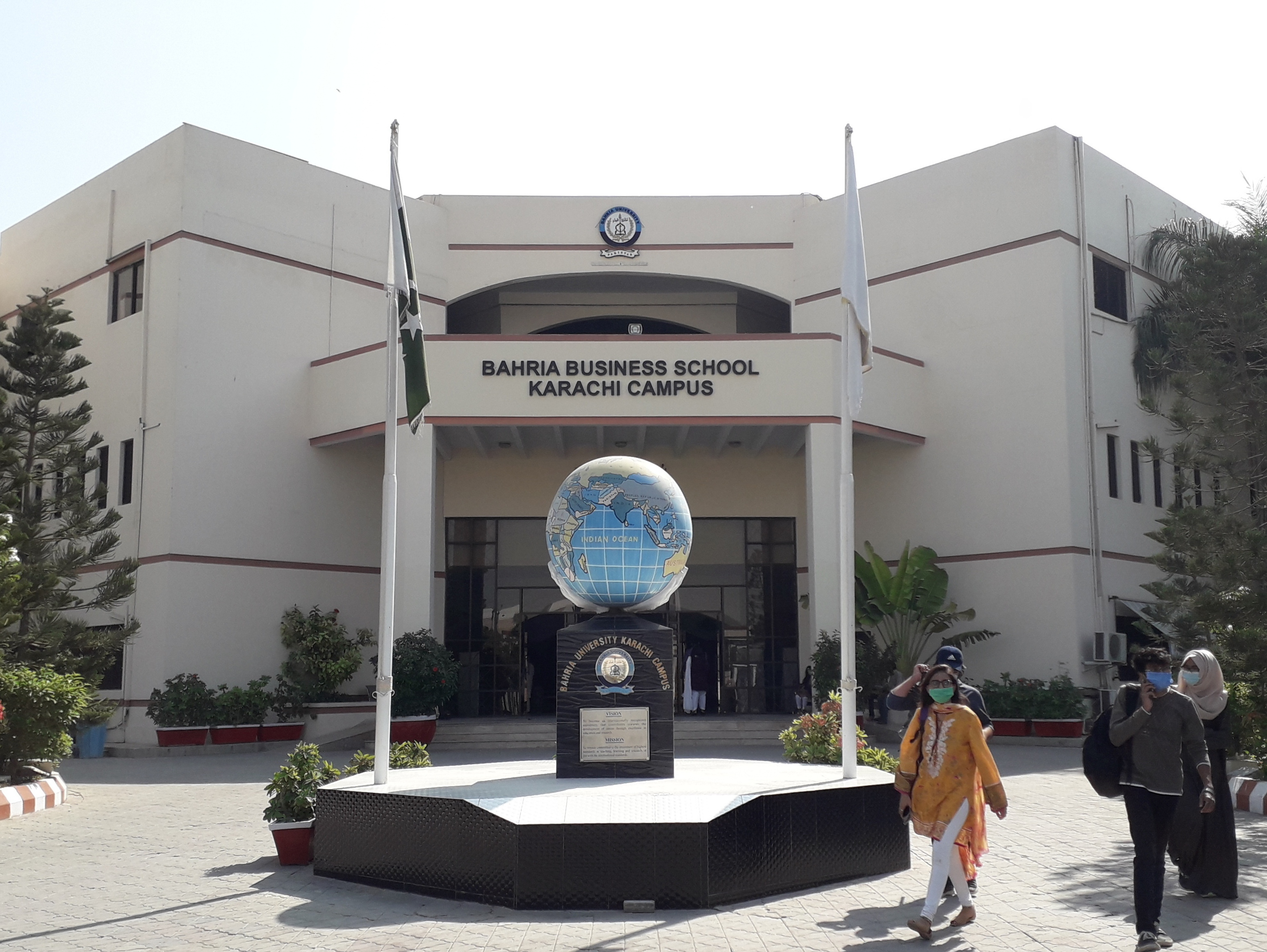
Bahria University Karachi campus

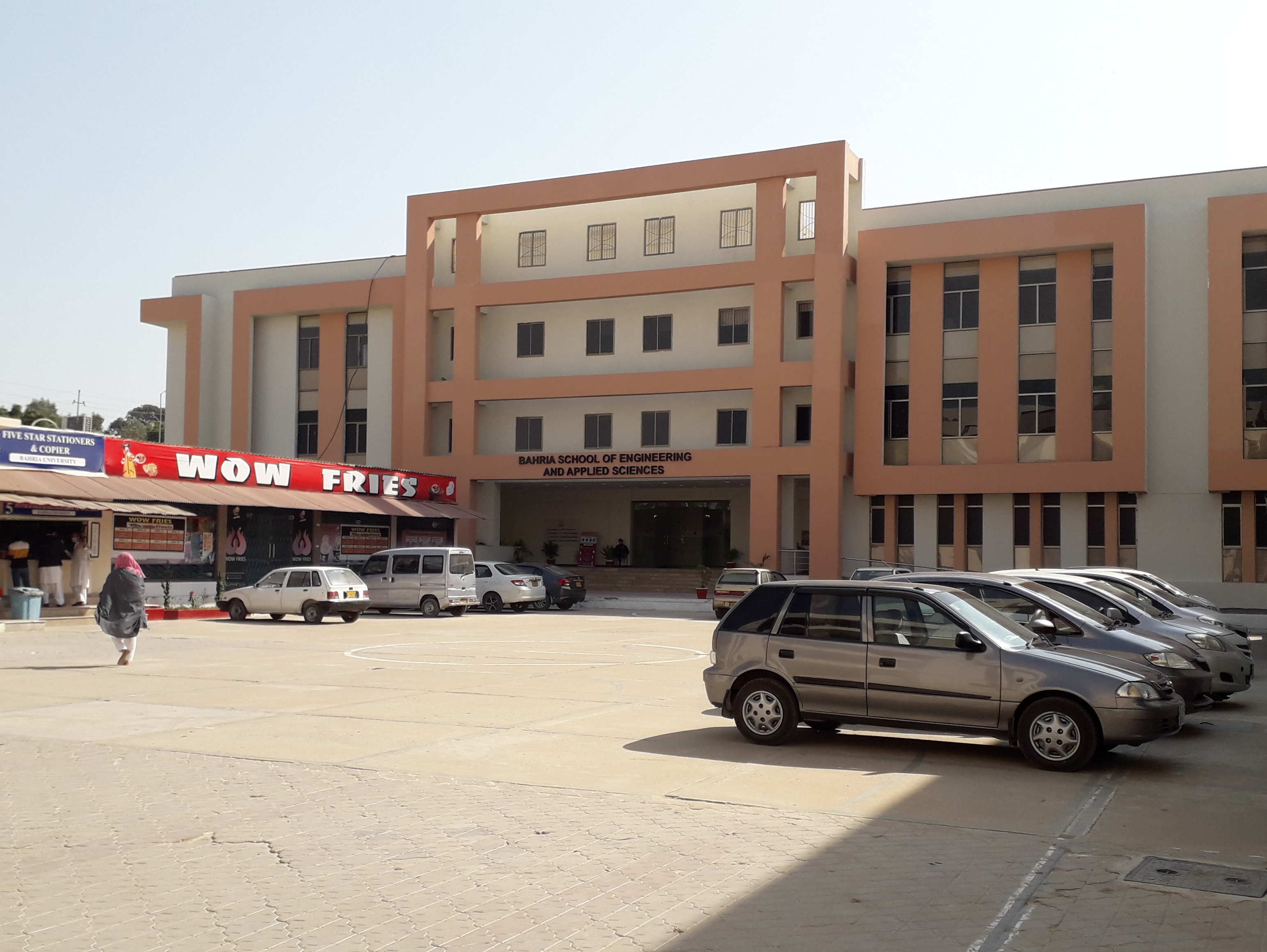
Bahria University Karachi Campus Engineering Department

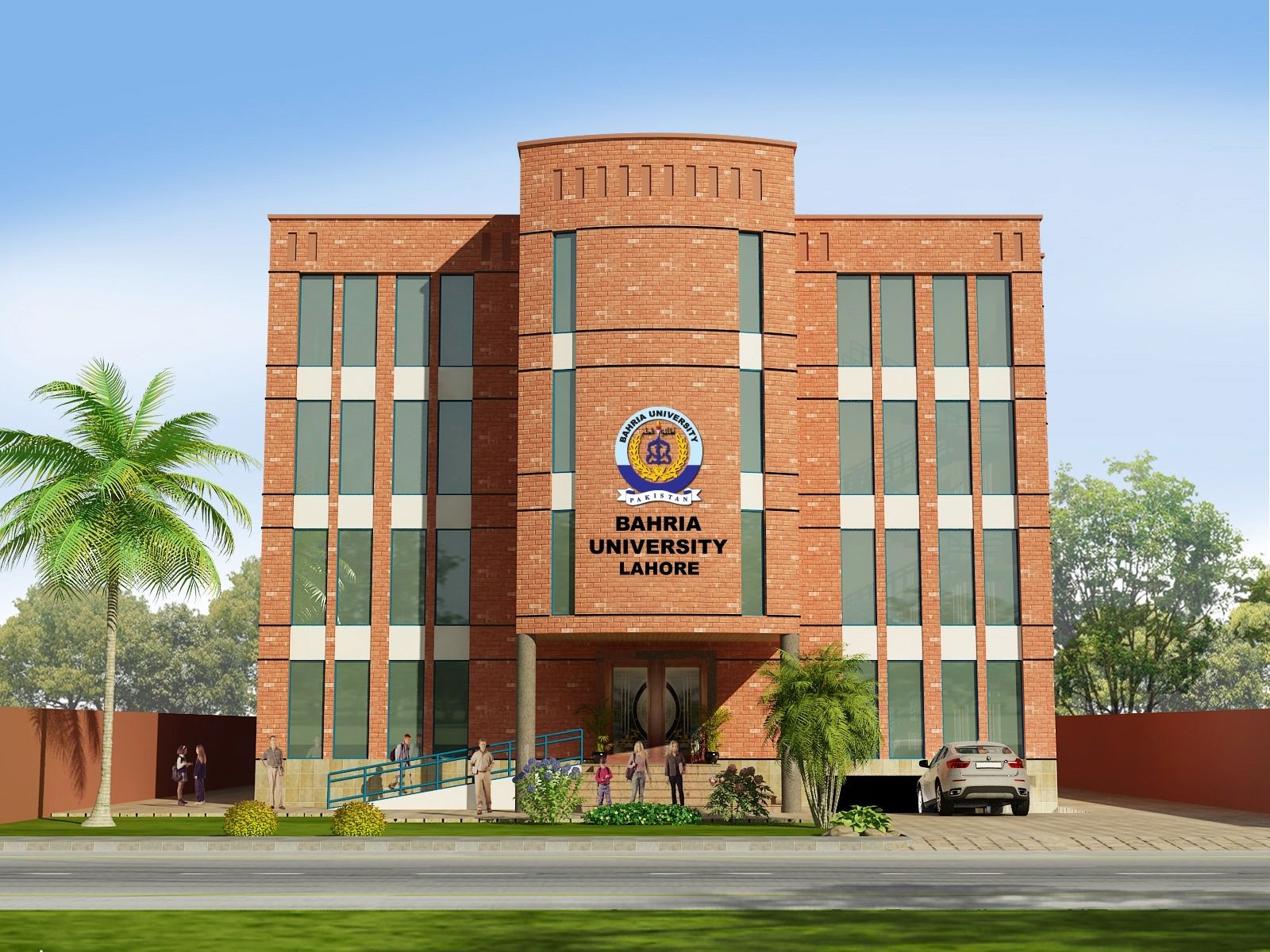
Bahria University Lahore Campus

The university has campuses in Islamabad, Karachi and Lahore. The headquarters of the university is in Islamabad, consisting of three blocks (OC, NC and XC) including a girls hostel. A new building has been constructed for business students. Furthermore, the headquarters consists of a business incubation center, auditorium, gymnasium, and several cafeterias throughout the campus.

- Bahria University Islamabad Campus (Headquarter)
- Bahria University H-11 Campus, Islamabad
- Bahria University Karachi Campus
- Bahria University Lahore Campus
- Institute of Professional Psychology, Karachi
- National Center for Maritime Policy Research, Karachi
- Bahria University Health Sciences Campus, Islamabad
- Bahria University Health Sciences Campus, Karachi

== Affiliated colleges ==
Bahria University is the awarding body for the following affiliated institutions:

- Frontier Medical College, Abbottabad
- Yusra Medical & Dental College, Islamabad
- Institute of Teachers Education, Rawalpindi
- Bahria University Medical and Dental College, Karachi

== International linkages ==
Bahria University has signed memoranda of understanding with the following 21 international universities:

- Valparaiso University, USA
- University of Wollongong, Australia
- Edith Cowan University, Australia
- Dogus University, Turkey
- International College Beijing, China
- Tongji University, China
- University of Leicester, UK
- University of Nottingham, UK
- York St. John University, UK
- University of Bedfordshire, UK
- Greenwich University, UK
- Massachusetts Institute of Technology, USA
- Dalhousie University, Canada
- Chabahar Maritime University, Iran
- Al-Khawarizmi Intl. College, UAE
- Institute of Oriental Studies, Azerbaijan
- King's College – Corbett Center, UK
- Trieste University, Italy
- Xuzhou Normal University
- Yasar University, Turkey
- Damghan University, Iran
- University of Idaho, USA

== Degrees offered ==
Bahria University offers the following undergraduate and postgraduate degrees at its constituent units: The standard of education is comparable to many European and American universities.

=== Management Sciences ===
- Bachelor of Business Administration
- Bachelor of Maritime Business & Management
- BS (Accounting and Finance)
- BS (Project Management)
- Master of Business Administration
- Master of Business Administration (At Weekend)
- MS Maritime Ports and Shipping Management
- MS Maritime Trade and Logistics
- MBA (Pharmaceutical Business Management)
- Post Graduate Diploma (Pharmaceutical Business Management)
- MPhil (Management Sciences)
- PhD (Management Sciences)
- MS in Project Management (Weekend)
- MS in Supply Chain (Weekend)
- MS in Finance

=== Electrical Engineering ===
- Bachelor of Electrical Engineering
- Bachelor of Electrical Engineering (Telecommunication)
- Bachelor of Science Robotics & Intelligent Systems (BS-RIS)
- Master of Science Electrical Engineering
- PhD Electrical Engineering

=== Computer Engineering ===
- Bachelor of Computer Engineering
- PhD Computer Engineering

=== Software Engineering ===
- Bachelor of Software Engineering
- Masters of Science Software Engineering
- PhD Software Engineering
- Masters of Science Engineering Management

=== Department of Law ===
- LLB (Bachelor of Law)
- LLM (General)
- LLM (International and Maritime Laws)
- PhD (Law)

=== Computer Science ===
- Bachelor of Science (Computer Science)
- Bachelor of Science (Artificial Intelligence)
- * Bachelor of Science (Information Technology)
- Master of Science (Computer Science)
- Master of Science (Data Science)
- Master of Science (Information Security)
- Master of Science (Mathematics)
- PhD Computer Science
- PhD Mathematics

=== Earth and Environmental Sciences ===
- Bachelor of Science (Geology)
- Bachelor of Science (Geophysics)
- Bachelor of Science (Environmental Sciences)
- Master of Science (Geology)
- Master of Science (Geophysics)
- Master of Science (Environmental Sciences)
- Master of Science (Environmental Policy and Management)

=== Professional Psychology ===
- Bachelor of Science Psychology
- PMD Psychology
- MPhil Psychology
- MS Clinical Psychology
- PhD Psychology

=== Humanities and Social Sciences ===
- Bachelor of International Relations
- Bachelor of Social Sciences
- Bachelor of Media Studies
- Bachelor of Economics

=== Medical and Dental Sciences ===
- Bachelor of Medicine and Bachelor of Surgery
- Bachelor of Dental Surgery (BDS)

== Sports ==
The university helps its students to participate in national and university level sports. The Bahria University Islamabad Campus has a large gymnasium to facilitate sporting events such as basketball matches. There is also a separate fitness gym for males and females to train at their own times. These gyms include treadmills, weight lifting machines, and many curricular activities to facilitate the students.

== Societies ==
Bahria University has student-driven societies, clubs and associations that work under the tutelage of the student affairs office. Societies and clubs at BU include:

- An-Nakhla Society (BU H-11)
- Bahria University Computing and Innovative Society (BUCIS)
- Bahria Association of Computer Sciences and Professionals (BACSAP)
- Bahria University Law Society (BULS)
- Bahria University Law Moot Society (BULMS)
- Bahria Youth Technothon (BYTE)
- Bahria Community Support Program (CSP)
- Media Club (Saad Tehsin)
- Arts & Dramatics Club
- The Music Society
- The Events Club
- The Literature & Debates Club
- IEEE BUIC
- IEEE BULC
- Society Of Empowerment (SOE) BUKC
- Bahria Visionary Club (BVC)
- Google Developer Group on Campus (Bahria University Lahore)

== Notable alumni ==
- Hasan Raheem, singer-songwriter
- Umair Jaswal, singer
- Yashma Gill, actor
- Rafay Baloch, IT hacker and security researcher
- Masuma Anwar, Doctor by profession and a singer
- Sana Mahmud, Athlete

== Rectors ==
- Shahid Iqbal, (2010–2013)
- Tanveer Faiz, (2013–2016)
- M Shafiq, (2016–2019)
- Kaleem Shaukat, (2019–2022)
- Asif Khaliq, (2022–2025)
- Abid Hameed, (2025-Continue)

== See also ==
- Higher Education Commission of Pakistan
- Pakistan Engineering Council
- Pakistan Medical and Dental Council
- National Business Education Accreditation Council
- National Computing Education Accreditation Council
- Pakistan Bar Council
