= Ovais Ahmed Bilgrami =

Vice admiral in Pakistan Navy

Vice Admiral Ovais Ahmed Bilgrami HI(M) SI(M) TI(M)
- Alma mater: PN War College; National Defence University; Royal College of Defence Studies
- Military career
- Allegiance: Pakistan
- Branch: Pakistan Navy
- Service years: 1989 –
- Rank: Vice admiral
- Commands: Commander Pakistan Fleet (COMPAK); Commander Karachi (COMKAR); PNS KHAIBAR
- Awards: Hilal-e-Imtiaz (Military); Sitara-e-Imtiaz (Military); Tamgha-e-Imtiaz (Military)

Ovais Ahmed Bilgrami HI(M) SI(M) TI(M) is a flag officer in the Pakistan Navy. He has served as Vice Chief of the Naval Staff (VCNS) in NHQ, Islamabad. Before this he also served as Commander Karachi,, Commander, Pakistan Fleet, Chief Staff Officer to the Commander, Pakistan Fleet and Principal Secretary to the Chief of the Naval Staff.

== Career ==
Bilgrami was commissioned in the Pakistan Navy as a Sub Lieutenant in 1989 upon graduating from the Naval Academy and was conferred with the Sword of Honour, with his first appointment at the operations branch in July 1989. He obtained his military education from Britannia Royal Naval College and master's degree in international security and strategy from King's College London. He graduated from the Pakistan Naval War College, the National Defence University, the Armed Forces of the Philippines Command and General Staff College, and the Royal College of Defence Studies, UK.

His command assignments includes commanding officer PNS Khaibar, while staff assignments includes director National Defence University, Islamabad, director Naval Development Plans, and Operations. He also served as assistant chief of naval staff (operational plans) and additional secretary in the ministry of defence.

== Awards and decorations ==

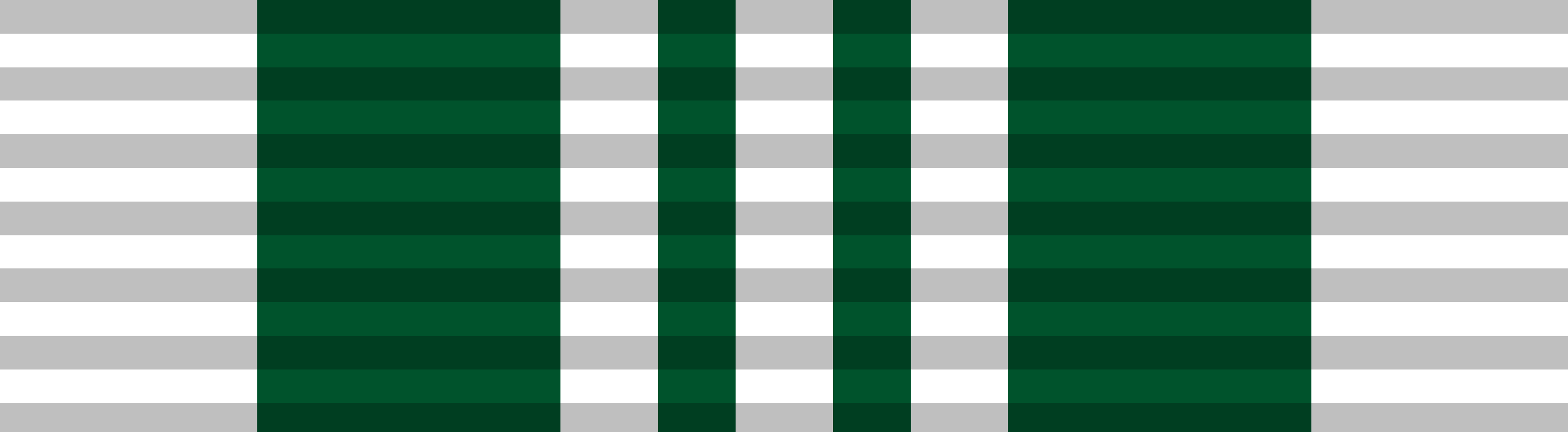

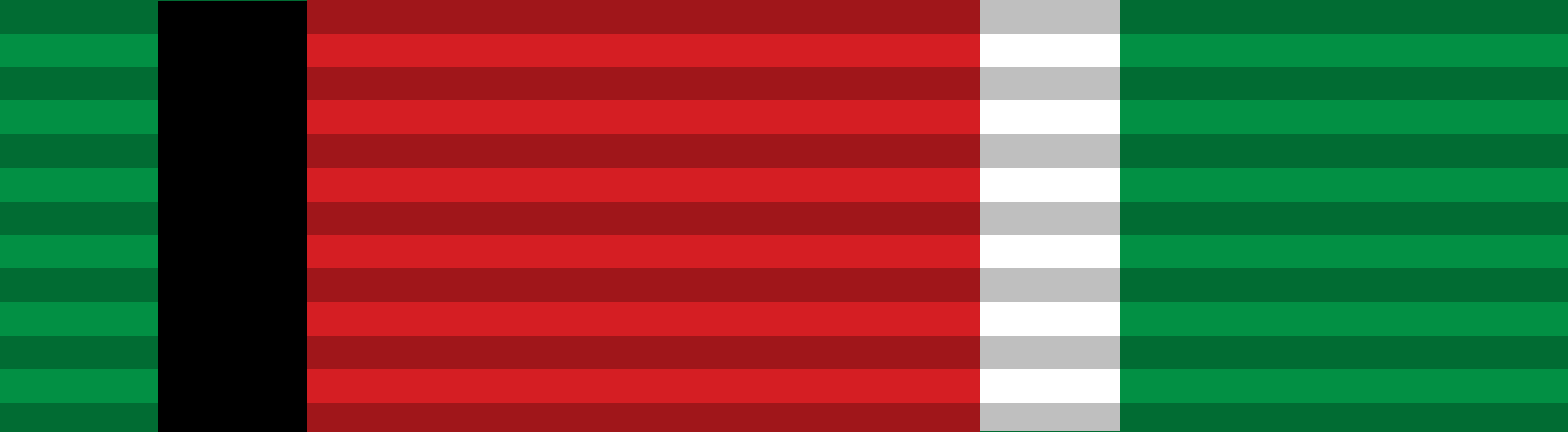

	Hilal-e-Imtiaz (Military) (Crescent of Excellence)		
Sitara-e-Imtiaz (Military) (Star of Excellence)	Tamgha-e-Imtiaz (Military) (Medal of Excellence)	Tamgha-e-Baqa (Nuclear Test Medal) 1998	Tamgha-e-Istaqlal Pakistan (Escalation with India Medal) 2002
Tamgha-e-Azm (Medal of Conviction) (2018)	10 Years Service Medal	20 Years Service Medal	30 Years Service Medal
35 Years Service Medal	Jamhuriat Tamgha (Democracy Medal) 1988	Qarardad-e-Pakistan Tamgha (Resolution Day Golden Jubilee Medal) 1990	Tamgha-e-Salgirah Pakistan (Independence Day Golden Jubilee Medal) 1997
