= Ahmed Saeed (admiral) =

Admiral in the Pakistan Navy

Vice Admiral Ahmed Saeed HI(M) SI(M) TI(M)
- Born: Ahmed Saeed
- Military career
- Allegiance: Pakistan
- Branch/Service: Pakistan Navy
- Service years: 1985–2021
- Rank: Vice Admiral
- Unit: Naval Operations Branch
- Commands: Naval Strategic Forces Command; Deputy Chief of the Naval Staff, Projects (DCNS-Proj), NHQ; Commander, Submarines(COMSUBS), Karachi; Assistant Chief of the Naval Staff Operations (ACNS-O), NHQ; DG Joint warfare, JS HQ
- Conflicts: War in Afghanistan; War in North-West Pakistan; Indo-Pakistani skirmishes
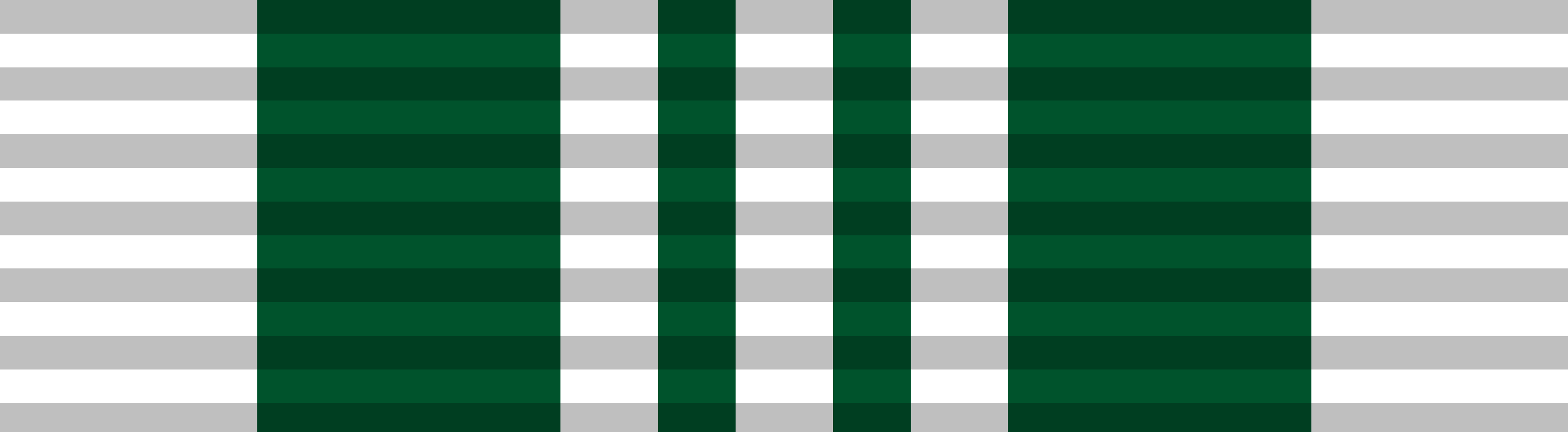
- Awards: Hilal-e-Imtiaz (Military) Sitara-e-Imtiaz (Military) Tamgha-e-Imtiaz (Military)

Ahmed Saeed HI(M) SI(M) TI(M) is a retired three-star rank admiral in the Pakistan Navy.

== Awards and decorations ==

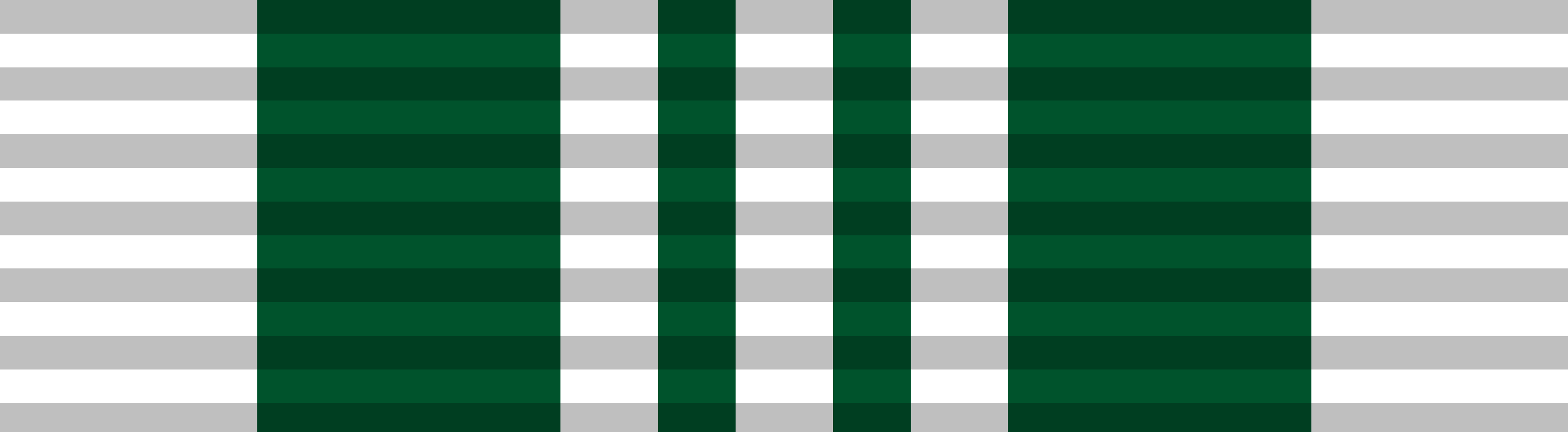

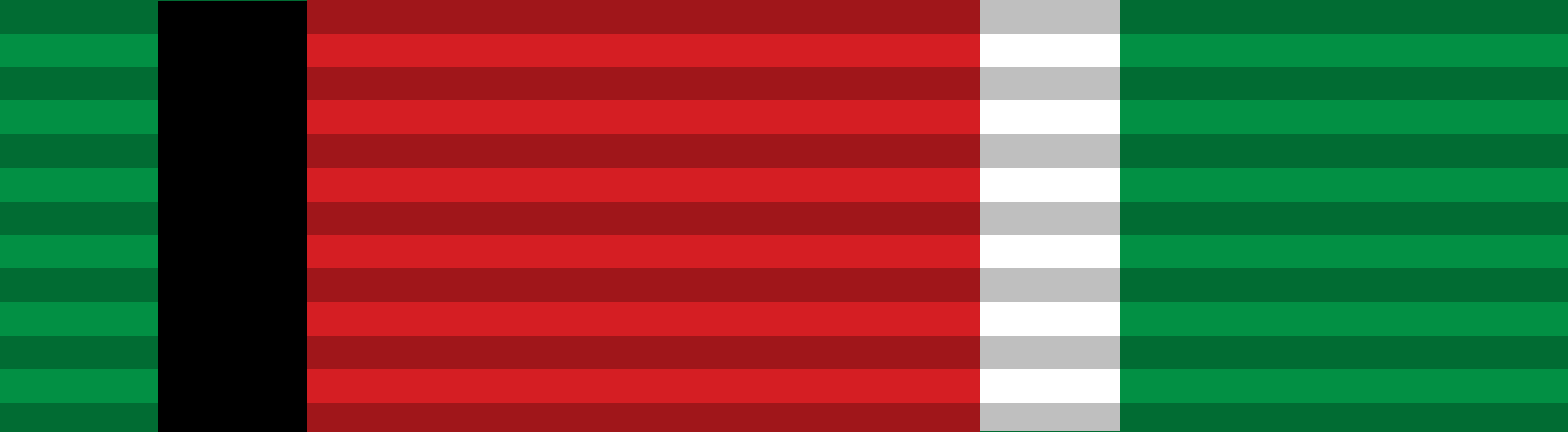

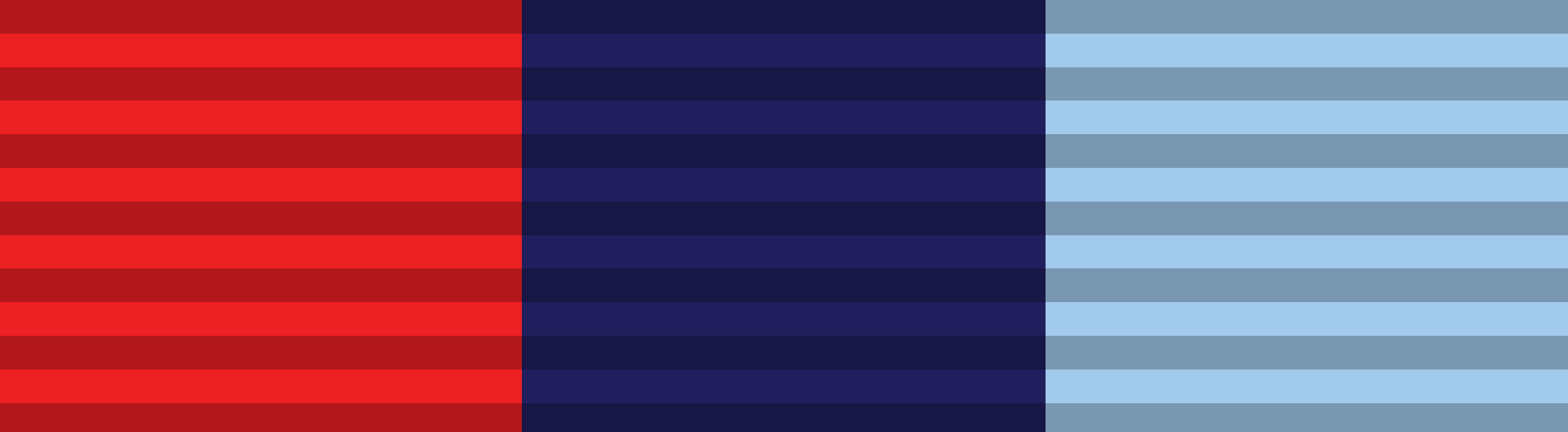

Hilal-e-Imtiaz (Military) (Crescent of Excellence)		Sitara-e-Imtiaz (Military) (Star of Excellence)	
Tamgha-e-Imtiaz (Military) (Medal of Excellence)	Tamgha-e-Baqa (Nuclear Test Medal) 1998	Tamgha-e-Istaqlal Pakistan (Escalation with India Medal) 2002	Tamgha-e-Azm (Medal of Conviction) (2018)
10 Years Service Medal	20 Years Service Medal	30 Years Service Medal	35 Years Service Medal
40 Years Service Medal	Jamhuriat Tamgha (Democracy Medal) 1988	Qarardad-e-Pakistan Tamgha (Resolution Day Golden Jubilee Medal) 1990	Tamgha-e-Salgirah Pakistan (Independence Day Golden Jubilee Medal) 1997
