= 2008 India–Pakistan standoff =

Standoff between India and Pakistan

- Part of Indo-Pakistani wars and conflicts
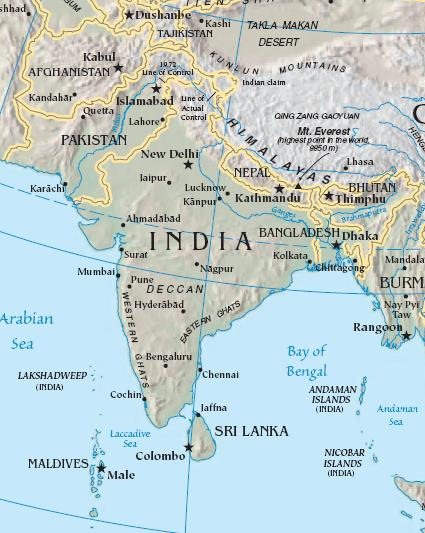
- Map of Indian subcontinent
Date	November–December 2008 (1 month)
Location	Indo-Pakistan border
Result	De-escalation; Threat of war was neutralised Media of both side started the public side peace initiatives

Belligerents
India: Indian Army; Indian Air Force; Indian Navy	Pakistan: Pakistan Army; Pakistan Air Force; Pakistan Navy

Commanders and leaders
Manmohan Singh (Prime Minister of India); Pratibha Patil (President of India); Pranab Mukherjee (Minister of External Affairs); Gen. Deepak Kapoor (Chief of Army Staff); ACM Fali Homi Major (Chief of Air Staff); Adm. Sureesh Mehta (Chief of Naval Staff)	Yusuf Raza Gilani (Prime Minister of Pakistan); Asif Ali Zardari (President of Pakistan); Ahmad Mukhtar (Defence Minister of Pakistan); Gen Tariq Majid (Chairman Joint Chiefs); Gen. Ashfaq Kayani (Chief of Army Staff); ACM Tanvir Ahmad (Chief of Air Staff); Adm. Noman Bashir (Chief of Naval Staff); Adm. Asaf Humayun (Commandant Marines)

After the 2008 Mumbai attacks, Pakistan and the ISI were believed by India to be directly responsible for the attacks, leading to strained relations between the two countries for a period of time. An Anti-Pakistani sentiment also rose in India, causing many, including the United States to call for probes into it.

The standoff was significant because both the countries were nuclear nations, having first successfully tested nuclear weapons in 1974 and 1998 respectively. The countries had already participated in 4 wars since their partition and independence in 1947, and relations between the two nations have been strained throughout their histories. The lone surviving terrorist of the Mumbai attacks confirmed that the terrorists came from Pakistan, and that they were trained by Lashkar-e-Taiba operatives. In 2011, he also confessed that the ISI had been supporting them throughout the attacks.

== Event and preparations ==
=== Military preparations ===
The Mumbai attacks lasted from 26 to 29 November 2008. At a state lunch in Lahore on 7 December, the US Arizona Senator John McCain relayed a message from Indian Prime Minister Dr. Manmohan Singh to several of Pakistan's dignitaries, including Pakistan's Prime Minister Yousuf Raza Gilani that if Pakistan did not arrest those involved with the attacks, India would begin aerial attacks against Pakistan.

On 19 December, private intelligence agency, Stratfor, in its latest report, said, "Indian military operations against targets in Pakistan have in fact been prepared, and await the signal to go forward". They also wrote that, "Indian military preparations, unlike previous cases, will be carried out in stealth". India's Border Security Force (BSF) has been put on high alert on the western sector, as well as the eastern sector, to prevent terrorist infiltration.

In mid December Indian fighter planes allegedly intruded Pakistan's air space at two places. On 22 December, the Pakistan Air Force began combat air patrol (CAP) over several cities, including Islamabad, Lahore, and Rawalpindi, to avert any further air intrusion. Pakistan's Foreign Minister Shah Mehmood Qureshi said, "Pakistan defence forces and armed forces are ready to face any challenge, as Pakistan has the full right to defend itself". Pakistan PM Yousuf Raza Gilani said, "Pakistan remains united and is ready to fight anyone to defend itself". Pakistani Defense Minister Ahmad Mukhtar Chaudhry said, "If India tried to thrust war, then the armed forces of Pakistan have all the potential and right to defend [Pakistan]".

=== Escalations and back-door response ===
According to Pakistani media, India had started deploying troops along the Rajasthan border, and had tightened security in and around the defence airstrips. More radars and quick reaction teams were then deployed along the India-Pakistan border. Indian forces were on regular firing exercises at locations, like Lathi Firing Range in Jaisalmer, Mahsan in Bikaner, Suratgarh and Ganganagar.

On 23 December, Kamal Hyder, Al Jazeera's correspondent in Pakistan, wrote that the Pakistan "navy, marines air force and army were on red alert" and that "the chiefs of Pakistan's armed forces together with the Chairman Joint Chiefs were holding what had been described as an emergency meeting at joint headquarters in Rawalpindi". He also wrote that "[t]he Pakistan air force have been seen visibly in a number of locations flying close to the Pakistani-India border, in what is being described as an aggressive patrolling mode, following reports that India is planning pre-emptive strikes against locations in Pakistan". A Pakistan airforce spokesperson said "[i]n view of the current environment, the Pakistan Air Force has enhanced its vigilance". Pakistan army chief General Ashfaq Parvez Kayani, said that Pakistan would mount an equal response "within minutes", to any Indian attack. Pakistan continued to combat air patrol over several cities.

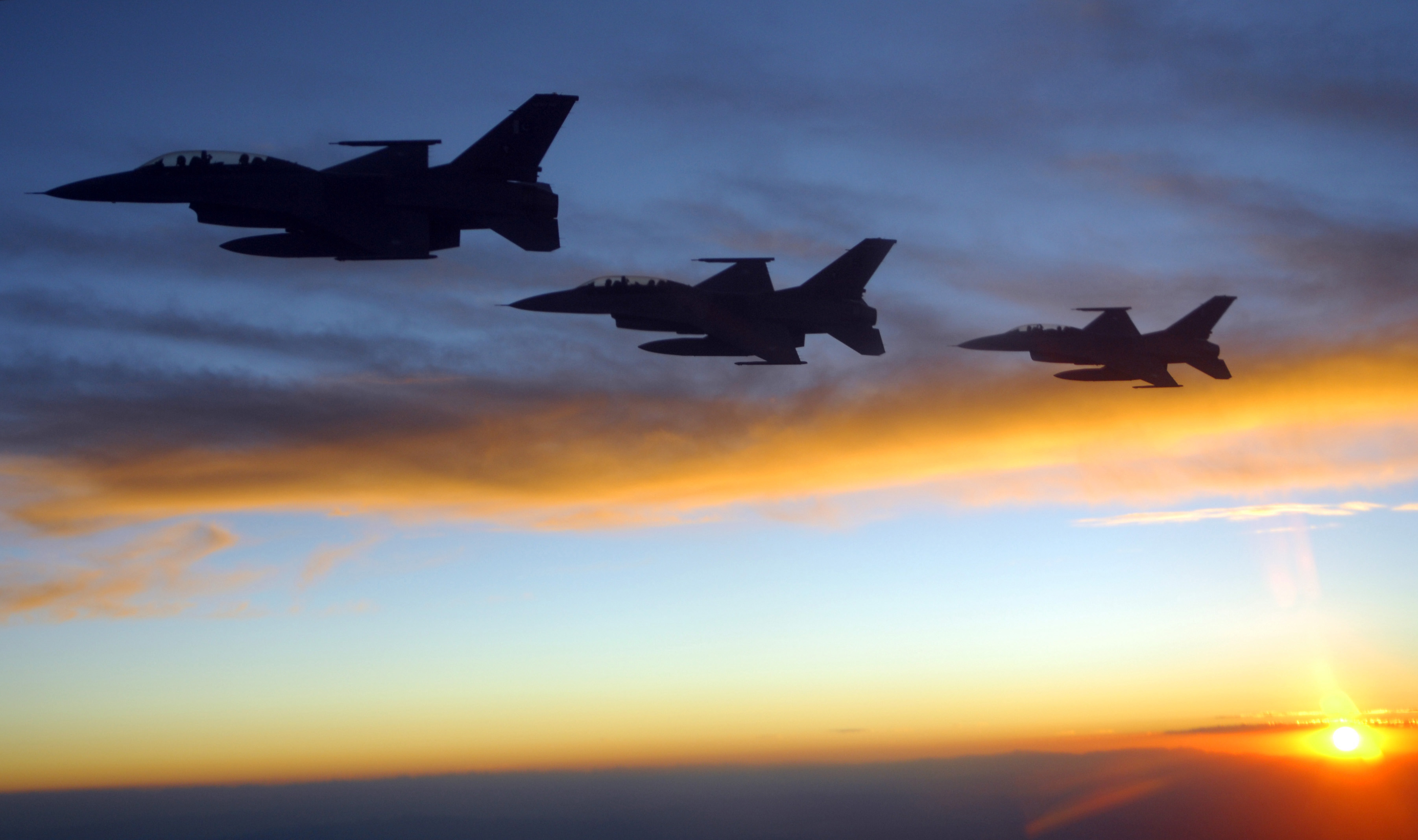
The Pakistan Air Force F-16s in Action, Pakistan began Combat Air Patrol over several cities

According to Indian sources the Taliban and affiliated groups openly declared their solidarity with Pakistan. The banned Tehrik-e-Taliban had proclaimed that they would send "thousands of (their) well-armed militants" to wage jihad against India if war should break out. Hundreds of would-be bombers were equipped with suicide jackets and explosive-laden vehicles.

On 24 December, P.K. Barbora, the air officer commanding-in-chief of Western Air Command, said "[t]he IAF has earmarked 5,000 targets in Pakistan. But whether we will cross the LoC or the International Border to hit the enemy targets will have to be decided by the political leadership of the country". India Today reported that "Indian Air Force fighter planes are engaged in round the clock sorties. An unusual hectic activity of Indian Air Force has been visible along the border for past some days". On the same day, Stratfor confirmed that "the state government of Rajasthan has ordered residents of its border villages to be prepared for relocation". President Asif Ali Zardari said "We will defend the country till the last drop of our blood", and "we will defend the country till our last breath". Pakistan began deploying warplanes to forward air bases.

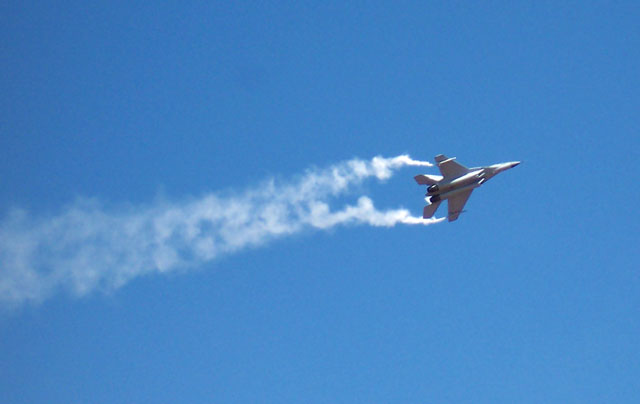
All Mig-29s were put on high-alert and for New Delhi's air defence.

=== Diplomacy and neutralisation ===
On 25 December, however, the ruling UPA government in India played down apprehensions of an imminent military conflagration. The Indian Prime Minister made it clear that "nobody wanted war". The Pakistan Air Force (PAF) played a subsequent role during this time and the Indian Air Force downplayed the sorties by PAF fighter jets, saying it was an air defence exercise. However, R. C. Dhyani, DIG of Rajasthan frontier BSF, said, "[a] lot of military movement is being noticed in districts just across the international border for the last few days, which is not normal" and "Pakistan has deployed more troops across border". The Chairman Senate of Pakistan, Senator Raza Rabbani, said that any surgical strike into its territory would be taken as an act of war and would be repulsed with "full force", and that "[e]ach and every inch of the country will be safeguarded". India moved MiG-29s to Hindon air base, located near New Delhi, in order "to protect the capital from aerial threats". The Pakistani city of Mianwali began a blackout.

Pakistan continued deployment, and moved the 10th Brigade to the outskirts of Lahore, and the 3rd Armored Brigade to Jhelum. The 10th Infantry Division and the 11th Infantry Division had been placed on high alert. The Indian Army deployed quick reaction teams (QRTs) along the border, which "precede the movement of bridging equipment – to cross canals in Punjab – and of heavy guns".

Amir Mir of Daily News and Analysis wrote that "Pakistan's military leadership has advised president Asif Ali Zardari to take back his statement made last month, that his country would not be the first to use nuclear weapons in the event of a conflict with India".

On 26 December, Pakistan cancelled all military leave and activated contacts with friendly countries and military partners. Pakistan deployed troops to "protect vital points along the Line of Control (LoC) in Jammu and Kashmir and the international border with India". Pakistani Foreign Minister Quresh said that, "if war is imposed, we will respond to it like a brave, self-respecting nation". Indian Prime Minister Manmohan Singh held a second meeting of the Nuclear Command Authority to "discuss all the options available to India". Pakistan deployed the 14th Infantry Division to Kasur and Sialkot, close to the border. India advised its citizens not to travel to Pakistan. Indian Prime Minister Manmohan Singh met with the chiefs of the Indian air force, army, and navy.

On 27 December, India's largest opposition party, the Bharatiya Janata Party (BJP), called for all travel between India and Pakistan to be stopped, and for the recall of the Indian High Commissioner from Pakistan. The Pakistani Army alerted retired army personnel to be ready to be called up to active duty. On 28 December, Pakistan postponed all officer training courses.

On 29 December, the leaders of the Indian and Pakistani armies spoke over their red telephone, to avert an accidental nuclear war. The President of the BJP, Rajnath Singh, called for a joint India-US military action against Pakistan. John McCain said, "The Indians are on the verge of some kind of attack on Pakistan".

On 30 December, Pakistani media stated: "The service chiefs of all of the branches of India's military were told to stay in the country in order to achieve 'complete readiness'. All units that are on exercises have been ordered to remain so indefinitely, and to indicate any equipment or ammunition they need". However, this was not backed by Indian or international media.

==== Pakistani deployments ====
The Pakistan military had cancelled all leave. Elements of the Pakistan Air Force had been deployed to front line bases. The IV Corp, with 60,000 troops, has been deployed to Lahore. Pakistan had deployed the 3rd Armored Brigade to Jhelum, and the 10th Infantry Brigade, with 5,000 troops, to Lahore. The 10th Division had been deployed to Ichogul and the 11th Division had been deployed to Tilla. The Pakistan Army combat brigades had been deployed to Kashmir and the Jammu sector of the border. The 14th Division, with 20,000 troops, had been deployed to Kasur and Sialkot. The ground forces were logistically and militarily supported by the Pakistan Navy's Punjab contingent and Pakistan Marines forces on each side of Pakistan. The Pakistan Navy deployed the sizeable unit of its surface fleet and submarines, including PNS Hamza and PNS Khalid, to pick up to intelligence movements and positions of the Indian warships to prevent them to reach near Karachi and coastal areas of Balochistan.

==== Indian deployments ====
India had put its Border Security Force, India's border patrol agency, on high alert. MiG-29s had been deployed to Hindon air base, to protect New Delhi. Later IAF sources claimed that the move was a result of intelligence inputs of an air attack on Delhi. The Indian Navy had moved six warships, including the INS Jalashwa and the INS Ranveer, to the west coast.

== See also ==
- Standoff of September 15, 2008 between United States and Pakistan
