= Vice Chief of the Naval Staff (Pakistan) =

- وائس چیف آف دی نیول اسٹاف
- Flag of the Vice Chief of the Naval Staff
- Incumbent; Ovais Ahmed Bilgrami since December 2023
- Ministry of Defence; Navy Secretariat-III at MoD
- Abbreviation: VCNS
- Reports to: Chief of the Naval Staff
- Seat: Naval Headquarters (NHQ); Islamabad, Pakistan
- Appointer: Prime Minister of Pakistan
- Formation: 3 March 1972; 54 years ago
- Succession: On basis of seniority, subjected to the decision of the Prime Minister of Pakistan.
- Unofficial names: Vice Naval chief
- Deputy: Deputy Chief of the Naval Staff (DCNS)
- Salary: According to Pakistan Military officer's Pay Grade(BPS-22)
- Website: Official website

The Vice Chief of the Naval Staff (VCNS) is the post that is, in principle, the deputy and the second-in-command (S-in-C) of the Pakistan Navy and is also the most senior Principal Staff Officer (PSO) at NHQ, reporting and functioning under the Chief of the Naval Staff. This post is usually held by a senior flag officer of Vice Admiral rank.

== Office holders ==
Order	Name	Rank	Photo	Appointment date	Left office	Unit of commission	Decorations	Ref.
±	Rashid Ahmad	Rear-Admiral		25 March 1969	20 December 1971	Executive Branch	SK, TQA	
1	Mohammad Sharif	Rear-Admiral		1974	1975	Executive Branch	HI(M), SI(M), HJ, SJ, SK Khaled Jamil was chief of naval staff until his retirement in 1956	
2	Leslie Norman Mungavin	Rear-Admiral		1975	1977	Operations Branch	SPk, SK	
3	Karamat Rahman Niazi	Vice-Admiral		1977	1979	Submarine Command	SJ, HI(M)	
4	Iqbal F. Qadir	Vice-Admiral		1980	1983	Operations Branch	HI(M), TI(M), SBt, TQA	
5	Iftikhar Ahmed Sirohey	Vice-Admiral		1985	1988	Engineering Branch	NI(M)	
6	Yastur-ul-Haq Malik	Vice-Admiral		1988	1991	Surface Branch	NI(M)	
7	Syed Iqtidar Husain	Vice-Admiral		1992	1993	Operations Branch	NI(M)	
?	Mohammad Haroon	Vice-Admiral		7 Nov 2005	2007?	Operations Branch	NI(M)	
?	Asaf Humayun	Vice-Admiral		30 Oct 2008	26 Dec 2009	Operations Branch	NI(M)	
?	Shahid Iqbal	Vice-Admiral		30 Dec 2009	12 Aug 2010	Operations Branch	NI(M)	
?	Asif Sandila	Vice-Admiral		10 Aug 2010	6 October 2011	Operations Branch	NI(M)	
?	Tayyab Ali Dogar	Vice-Admiral		October 2011	2012?	Operations Branch	NI(M)	
?	Khan Hasham bin Saddique	Vice-Admiral		10 November 2014	?	Operations Branch	HI(M), SI (M)	
?	Kaleem Shaukat	Vice-Admiral		?		Operations Branch	NI(M)	
?	Fayyaz Gilani	Vice-Admiral		17 November 2019		Operations Branch		
?	Muhammad Amjad Khan Niazi	Vice-Admiral		?	7 October 2020	Operations Branch	NI(M)	
?	Faisal Rasul Lodhi	Vice-Admiral		3 September 2021		Operations Branch		
?	Naveed Ashraf	Vice-Admiral		March 2023	October 2023	Operations Branch		
	Ovais Ahmed Bilgrami	Vice-Admiral		October 2023	Incumbent	Operations Branch		

== See also ==
- Vice Chief of the Air Staff (Pakistan)
- Vice Chief of the Army Staff (Pakistan)
