= Fayyaz Gilani =

Vice chief of Pakistan naval staff

Vice Admiral Fayyaz Gilani HI(M) SI(M)
- Military career
- Allegiance: Pakistan
- Branch: Pakistan Navy
- Service years: 1984– 2020
- Rank: Vice Admiral
- Awards: Hilal-e-Imtiaz (Military); Sitara-e-Imtiaz (Military)

Muhammad Fayyaz Gilani HI(M) SI(M) is a retired Pakistani naval attaché and vice admiral in the Pakistan Navy and the former vice chief of the naval staff. Before assuming the office, he was serving as Chief of Staff branch Personnel, and later was assigned onboard for Washington as an attaché of Pakistan navy and now has retired from service.

== Education ==
Gilani graduated from the Pakistan Navy War College, and later attended Pakistan National Defence University where he received naval education. He later did military operational research, gaining a master's degree from Cranfield University, in the United Kingdom.

== Career ==
Gilani was commissioned in Pakistan navy department in 1984 with operations branch appointment. He served at various posts, including commanding officer for PNS Moawin and PNS PISHIN. He served at Commander Pakistan Fleet as a chief of staff officer and naval secretary, and later, he was promoted to staff appointments of fleets and units, including operations, projects, personnel, and training and evaluation.

== Awards and decorations ==

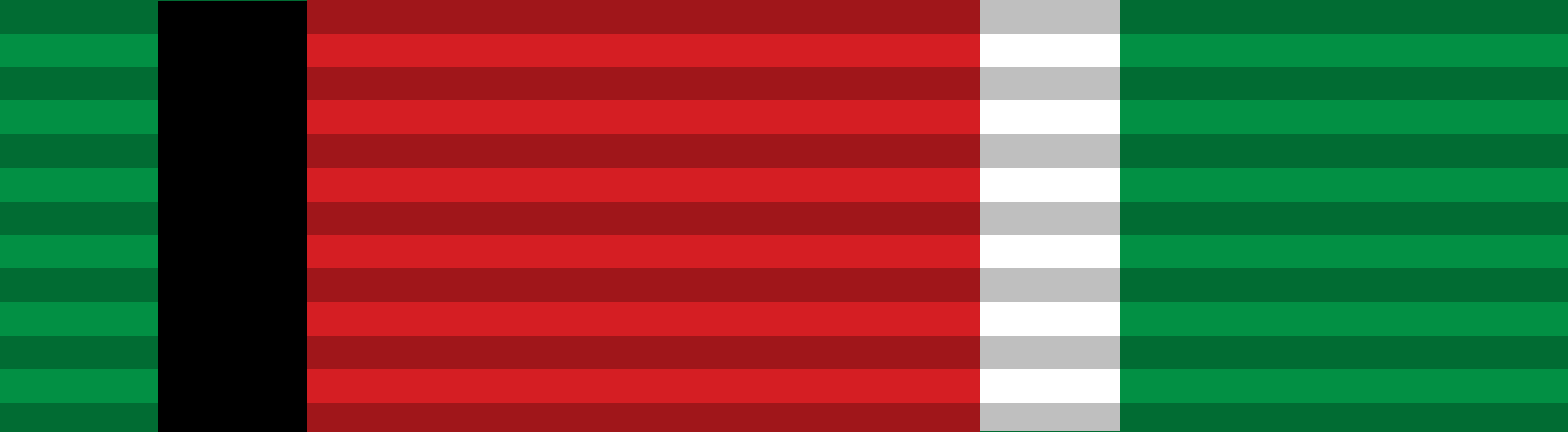

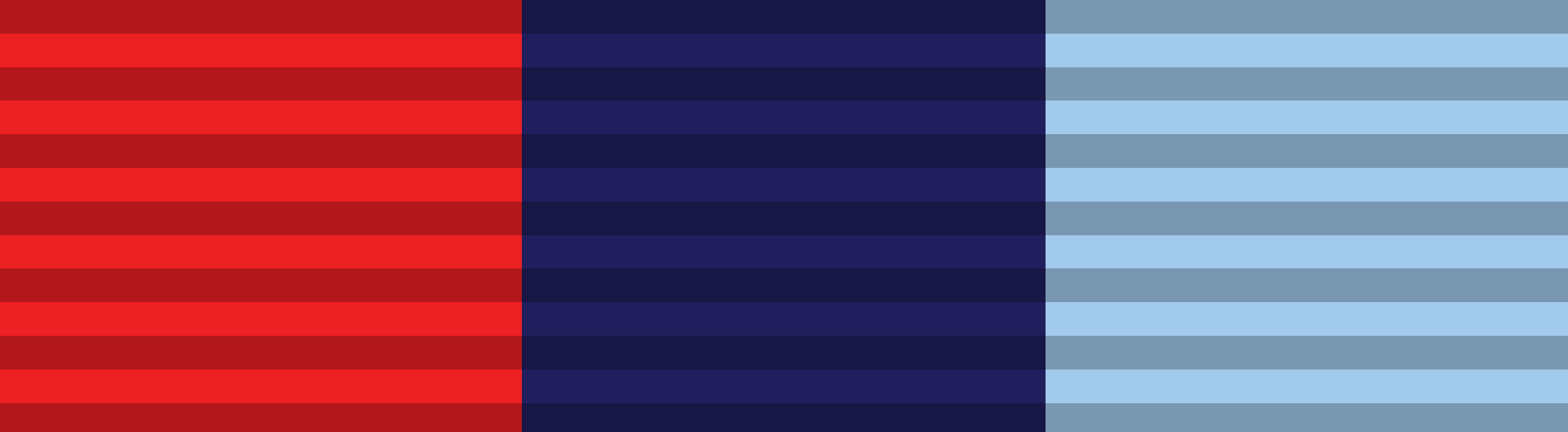

Hilal-e-Imtiaz (Military) (Crescent of Excellence)		Sitara-e-Imtiaz (Military) (Star of Excellence)	
Tamgha-e-Baqa (Nuclear Test Medal) 1998	Tamgha-e-Istaqlal Pakistan (Escalation with India Medal) 2002	Tamgha-e-Azm (Medal of Conviction) (2018)	10 Years Service Medal
20 Years Service Medal	30 Years Service Medal	35 Years Service Medal	40 Years Service Medal
Hijri Tamgha (Hijri Medal) 1979	Jamhuriat Tamgha (Democracy Medal) 1988	Qarardad-e-Pakistan Tamgha (Resolution Day Golden Jubilee Medal) 1990	Tamgha-e-Salgirah Pakistan (Independence Day Golden Jubilee Medal) 1997
