= Naval Strategic Forces Command (Pakistan) =

Pakistan Navy's strategic field formation

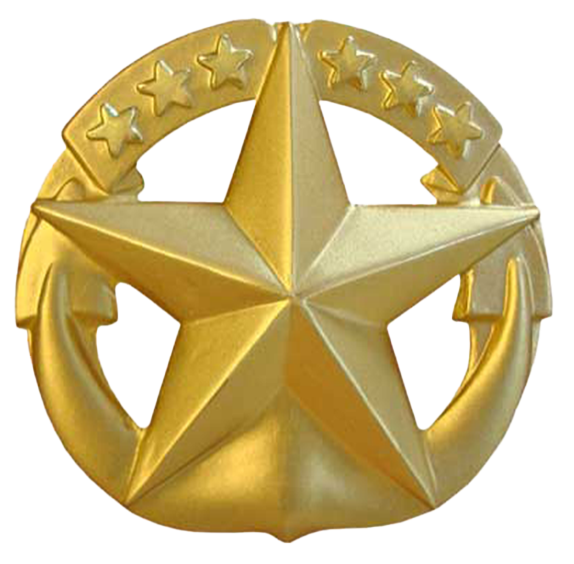
- Badge of the Pakistan Navy
- Active: 24 June 2004; 22 years ago
- Country: Pakistan
- Branch: Pakistan Navy
- Type: Command and control (C2)
- Role: Strategic deterrence Sea-based Second-strike
- Size: ☓☓ Division (Though, it is vary due to troops rotations based on strategic calculus)
- Headquarters/Garrison: Navy HQ in Islamabad

Commanders
- Commander: V-Adm. Abdul Samad

The Pakistan Navy Strategic Forces Command (reporting name: NSFC), is a strategic and missile formation of the Pakistan Navy. Headquartered in Navy HQ in Islamabad, the strategic command controls sea-based guided anti-ship ballistic and cruise missile systems – both conventional and nuclear.

The NSFC was organized in 2004 based on and influenced from the army's formation in 2002, and is responsible for sea-based strategic nuclear deterrence. The Pakistani government describes the formation as a "custodian of second-strike capability."

== Military overview ==
=== History ===
Before 2000, the Pakistan Air Force had an effective and operational controls over the deployment, target selections, intelligence, computers and interoperability of the nation's strategic deterrence through its own strategic formation. Protecting Pakistan's maritime border became a realization after the short-lived border conflict with India in 1999. Pakistani war strategists working at the Joint Staff HQ in Rawalpindi pointed out that if the conflict had reached a conventional scale, Pakistan would have been seriously disadvantaged.

As early as 2001, the Pakistani military strategists began to explore the idea of sea-based "Second strike" under navy rather than air force's control. The Navy HQ worked with the Army GHQ in Rawalpindi on establishing the sea-based deterrence and decided to commit greater resources for its development; consequently, tactics and strategic planning of Navy also underwent a shift.

In 2000, the work on establishing the formation was started under the watchful guidance of Adm. Shahid Karimulla, who was then-Chief of Naval Staff, and strongly advocated for the pursuit of idea of "Second strike". Admiral Karim rationalized that "since the Navy had been considering the deployment of nuclear weapons aboard its submarines-- it had to keep pace with developments in India." Although, Admiral Karim later left the option open, saying that the country had no plans to deploy nuclear weapons on its submarines, and that it would do so only if "forced to".

In 2004, the formation was established within the Navy which was based on the army's strategic forces command, and inaugurated its first headquarters in 2012 with Vice-Admiral Tanveer Faiz becoming its first commander.

The military media command, the ISPR described the NSFC as the "custodian of the nation's 2nd strike capability, will strengthen Pakistan's policy of Credible Minimum Deterrence and ensure regional stability."

== Employment ==
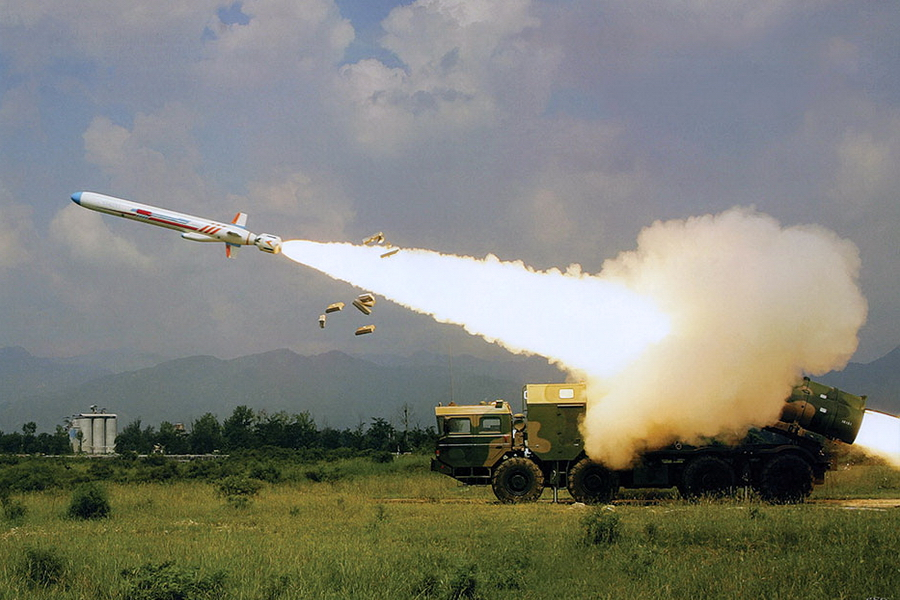
Besides the army, the navy is the military formation that employs the transporter erector launchers.

Besides the Pakistan Army's strategic formation, the Naval Strategic Forces Command is the only military formation that maintains and controls the employment of the transporter erector launchers, which is a primary ground-based delivery system for coastal defenses only. The Naval Strategic Command is distributed among the Pakistan Navy's missile regiment and the air defense battalions of the Pakistan Marines, focusing on the southern border.

The Navy's strategic formation is largely viewed as second-line capabilities that complement the principal land-based systems operated by the Army Strategic Force Command. In 2024, Naval Strategic Command becomes second formation to deploy the ballistic missiles in its service, complementing and second to the army's strategic formation.

=== List of Commanders ===
Commanders of the Naval Strategic Forces Command
Officer commanding of the Naval Strategic Forces Command	Start of assignment	End of assignment
Vice-Admiral Tanveer Faiz	2012	2015
Vice-Admiral Sohail Masood	2015	2019
Vice-Admiral Ahmed Saeed	2019	2021
Vice-Admiral Abdul Samad	2021	Present
