= PNS Shushuk (S132) =

Pakistan Navy diesel-electric submarine

PNS/M Shushuk (S-132)
- PNS Shushuk (S132) in the Indian Ocean in 2005.

History

Pakistan
- Name: Shushuk
- Namesake: Shushuk
- Ordered: 1966
- Builder: DCNS in Toulon in France
- Laid down: 1 December 1967
- Launched: 30 July 1969
- Commissioned: 12 January 1970
- Decommissioned: 2 January 2006
- In service: 1970–2006
- Home port: Naval Base Karachi in Sindh in Pakistan
- Identification: S132
- Fate: Sold for ship breaking to National Shipping Corporation

General characteristics
- Class & type: Daphné-class submarine; Hangor-class submarine (Subclass)
- Displacement: 873 long tons (887 t) (Surface); 1,054 long tons (1,071 t) (Submerged)
- Length: 57.80 m (189 ft 8 in)
- Beam: 6.80 m (22.3 ft)
- Draught: 4.60 m (15.1 ft)
- Installed power: 2 × Jeumont-Schneider alternators producing: 2,600 hp (1,900 kW).
- Propulsion: Diesel-electric: 2 × shafts; 2× SEMT-Pielstick 12 PA1 diesels 2,450 shaft horsepower (1,827 kW)
- Speed: Snorkelling: 16 knots (30 km/h); Surfaced: 13.5 knots (25.0 km/h)
- Range: 10,000 nautical miles (20,000 km) at 7 knots (13 km/h)
- Endurance: 30 days
- Test depth: 300 m (980 ft)
- Complement: 45, 7 officers, 41 enlisted
- Sensors & processing systems: DRUA 31 radar; DUUA 2B sonar; DSUV 2 passive sonar; DUUX acoustic telemeter
- Electronic warfare & decoys: ARUR 10B radar detector
- Armament: 12 × 550 mm (22 in) torpedo tubes (8 bow, 4 stern); 12 torpedoes or missiles

PNS/M Shushuk (S132) (nicknamed: "Dolphin"), was a Hangor-class diesel-electric submarine based on the French Daphné-class design. She was designed, built, and commissioned at Toulon, France. She was in service from 12 January 1970 until 2 January 2006.

She was laid down on 1 December 1967 at Toulon in France by the French DCNS, and launched on 30 July 1969, commissioned in the Pakistan Navy on 12 January 1970.

She saw action on the western front of the third war with India when she was deployed in the Arabian Sea to conduct submarine operations against the Indian Navy, and safely reported back to base after a ceasefire was reached between the two nations. After her war service, she voyaged to the Kamafuli river in Bangladesh and paid a goodwill visit through the Yangon River in Burma, and served on various military missions for the Navy.

On 2 January 2006, she was decommissioned, having completed 36 years of service with the Pakistan Navy.
