= Iftikhar Ahmed Sirohey =

Pakistani admiral (1934–2025)

Iftikhar Ahmed Sirohey NI(M) HI(M) SBt OM BJSN LoM

6th Chairman Joint Chiefs of Staff Committee
- In office 9 November 1988 – 17 August 1991
- Preceded by: Gen. Akhtar Abdur Rahman
- Succeeded by: Gen. Shamim Alam

Chief of Naval Staff
- In office 9 April 1986 – 9 November 1988
- Preceded by: Adm. Tariq Kamal Khan
- Succeeded by: Adm. Yastur-ul-Haq Malik

Personal details
- Born: Iftikhar Ahmed Sirohey; 1934 Karnal, Punjab Province, British India
- Died: 6 March 2025 (aged 90–91) Islamabad, Pakistan
- Citizenship: Pakistan (1947–2025); British Subject (1935–1947)
- Children: 4
- Nickname: Admiral IA Sirohey

Military service
- Branch: Pakistan Navy
- Service years: 1952–1991
- Rank: Admiral
- Unit: Operations Branch
- Commands: Vice Chief of Naval Staff; DCNS (Personnel); Commander Pakistan Fleet; Commander Karachi coast ACNS (Technical)
- Conflicts: Indo-Pakistani War of 1965; Indo-Pakistani War of 1971; Soviet–Afghan War
- Awards: Nishan-i-Imtiaz; Hilal-i-Imtiaz; Sitara-e-Basalat; National Order of Merit; Bintang Jalasena Utama; Order of King Abdulaziz; Legion of Merit; Tong-il Merit Medal; Order of the Crown

Admiral Iftikhar Ahmed Sirohey NI(M) HI(M) SBt OM BJSN LoM (Urdu: افتخار احمد سروہی; 1934 – 6 March 2025) was a Pakistani four-star-rank admiral, strategist, and a memoirist who was at the time of his death tenuring his fellowship at the Institute of Strategic Studies (ISS) in Islamabad, Pakistan.

Admiral Sirohey had previously tenured as the Chief of Naval Staff (CNS) of the Pakistan Navy from 1986 to 1988, and later ascended as the 6th Chairman of the Joint Chiefs of Staff Committee from 1988 until retiring in 1991. He was only the second four-star admiral in the Navy's history to be appointed Chairman Joint Chiefs.

After his retirement, he joined academia after accepting to be inducted in the faculty of the Sustainable Development Policy Institute and was working as a strategist for the Institute of Strategic Studies at the time when he died. He also authored his autobiography, Truth Never Retires, in 1996 which was published by the Jang Publishers in Lahore.

== Biography ==
=== Early life and education ===
Iftikhar Ahmed Sirohey was born in Karnal, a small town, in East Punjab, British India, in 1935. He hailed from a Punjabi family who were the local farmers in Karnal in East Punjab who moved to Muslim-majority West Punjab in 1940.

The family later moved to Karachi after the independence of Pakistan in 1947. After graduating from a local high school in Karachi, he joined the Karachi University to study electronics but saw the Navy's advertisement and decided to write to the Ministry of Defence with a view to joining the Navy. He left the Karachi University in 1951 when he was commissioned in the Navy as Midshipman and did his initial military training at the Pakistan Military Academy before being sent to the United Kingdom in 1952.

He was educated at the Royal Naval College at Greenwich in England where he specialised in signals/navigation and gained an electrical engineering course degree before returning to Pakistan in 1956. Upon returning to Pakistan, he was promoted as Sub-Lieutenant in the Navy and formally inducted in the Engineering Branch.

In 1981, he was directed to attend the course on defence studies at the National Defence University where he attained a master's degree in defence analysis in 1983.

=== Staff and war appointments ===
In 1958, Lt. Sirohey joined PNS Badr as its Executive officer, along with Lieutenant Iqbal F. Quadir, signals officer. He served on this assignment until 1960 when he was appointed aide-de-camp to Cdre M. Hassan, the Commander Karachi (COMKAR). In 1961–63, he served on PNS Khaibar on various command assignments. From 1963 to 1964, Lt. Sirohey acted as military adviser to Imperial Iranian Navy (IIN) in a programme funded by the United Kingdom.

In 1964, he was promoted as Lieutenant-Commander in the Navy, and participated in the second war with India in 1965. Lt.Cdr. Sirohey participated in the naval bombardment of Dwarka air station and acted as second-in-command (S-in-C) of PNS Alamgir commanded by Cdr Iqbal F. Quadir. Upon returning, he was appointed to command the PNS Tughril shortly after the war but the appointment was short lived.

In 1966–69, Lt.Cdr. Sirohey performed his duties as an aide-de-camp to then-Navy Commander-in-Chief Vice-Admiral Syed Mohammad Ahsan.

In 1970, he was posted in East Pakistan as military adviser to East Pakistan Rifles but was later directed to the United Kingdom for a diplomatic/defence assignment. He returned to Pakistan on 15 November 1971, and was made commanding officer of the PNS Alamgir in the 25th Destroyer Squadron during the war.

After the war, he was promoted as Commander and served as Naval Secretary at the Navy NHQ in Rawalpindi to the Chief of Naval Staff which he remained from 1972 to 1973. In 1973–75, he served as an instructor at the Pakistan Naval Academy in Karachi and served in the faculty of training until being promoted as Captain. In 1975–76, Sirohey was appointed naval attaché and served in the High Commission of Pakistan in London, United Kingdom.

Upon returning to Pakistan in 1976, Capt. Sirohey was appointed to serve as a Director of Naval Warfare and Operations (DNWO) under COMKAR, where he served until 1978. During this time, he made pioneering efforts in gaining knowledge on the Soviet-developed Styx missile acquired by the Egyptian Navy. In 1977–79, he was posted in Naval Intelligence and promoted as Commodore in the Navy. Cdre Sirohey was later directed to attend the National Defence University in Pakistan. From 1980 to 1983, he served as ACNS (Technical) and was later elevated as the DCNS (Personnel) at the Navy NHQ.

In 1983, he was promoted to two-star rank, Rear-Admiral, and assumed his duties as Commander Karachi coast (COMKAR). In 1984, he was appointed Commander Pakistan Fleet and promoted as Vice-Admiral in the Navy. In 1985, Vice-Admiral Sirohey was appointed VCNS under Chief of Naval Staff Admiral Tariq Kamal Khan.

=== Personal life and death ===
Sirohey was married, and had four sons; Saad, Asad, Samad and Fahd. He died in Islamabad on 6 March 2025.

== Chief of Naval Staff ==
On 8 April 1986, President Zia-ul-Haq announced the appointment of Vice-Admiral Sirohey as a four-star-rank admiral and as the new Chief of Naval Staff in a place of retiring Admiral Tariq Kamal Khan. On 9 April 1986, Sirohey took over the command of the Navy from Tariq Kamal Khan. Before his four-star appointment was confirmed, he was in a race with Vice-Admiral Ahmad Zamir who had initially been appointed to the post but suddenly died of a heart attack before Vice-Admiral Zamir was notified about the promotion.

He was the most senior admiral in the Navy; therefore, he superseded no one in the Navy. His tenure as naval chief saw the enhancement of Navy in terms of both manpower and military procurement from the United States.

As naval chief, Admiral Sirohey entered in complicated and expensive military procurement deal with the United States Navy in 1986. For that purpose in 1987, he went and visited the United States and the Pentagon to hold defence procurement talks with the United States military.

In 1987, the United States agreed to the transfer of eight Brooke-Garcia class surface warships and a repair ship to the Pakistan Navy on a five-year lease under a Foreign Military Sales programme in 1988. Admiral Sirohey also oversaw the introduction of installing imported Harpoon missiles on its frigates as early as 1988. He also engaged in procuring the P-3C Orion aircraft for the Navy but they weren't delivered until 1996. In 1988, he also visited China to strengthen Pakistan's military ties with China.

Admiral Sirohey backed Chief of Army Staff General Mirza Aslam Beg's decision to restore democratic rule after President Zia-ul-Haq's death in 1988. He endorsed Chairman Senate Ghulam Ishaq Khan's bid for Acting President and witnessed the general elections held in 1988 that saw Benazir Bhutto become the Prime Minister while forming the government in 1988.

== Chairman Joint Chiefs ==
In 1988, Prime Minister Benazir Bhutto appointed Admiral Sirohey as the next Chairman Joint Chiefs of Staff Committee to fill the vacancy caused by the death of General Akhtar Abdur-Rahman. Admiral Sirohey was the most senior four-star officer in the military and superseded no one.

In the military science circles, Admiral Sirohey was said to be fascinated with the latest technology, which made him look at the possibilities of procuring a nuclear submarine from China to counter India's acquisition of a Charlie-class nuclear submarine. On multiple occasions, Admiral Sirohey lobbied to procure the nuclear submarine from China on a short-term lease and had strongly advised to maintain a strong nuclear deterrence. As Chairman joint chiefs, Admiral Sirohey consolidated the nuclear arsenals development under the patronage of the Joint Chiefs of Staff Committee as its policy enforcement institution while tightening the security around the programme. In 1988, he worked with Prime Minister Benazir Bhutto to reach an agreement with India to exchange information on each other's nuclear facilities to avoid unintentional accidents and contingency plans to attack each other's facilities.

In 1989, he held meetings with Brigadier-General Ali Shamkhani, the Commander of the Iranian Revolutionary Guard, to hold talks on mutual defence interests. However, it was revealed by an historian that Shamkhani directly demanded the "hand over of the nuclear bombs" as part of the promise made by the former president. Upon hearing these demands, Admiral Sirohey demurred and General Shamkhani became irate. However, the claim of this meeting cannot be verified as Razaei later confessed that Admiral Sirohey did not recall the meeting "or ever hearing about a deal to sell nuclear weapons to Iran."

Admiral Sirohey, acting as military adviser to Prime Minister Benazir Bhutto and President Ghulam Ishaq Khan, supported the government's decision to support the Soviet Union's withdrawal from Afghanistan in 1989. After Prime Minister Benazir Bhutto paid her first state visit to the United States, Admiral Sirohey was caught in the political rivalry between President Ghulam Ishaq Khan and Prime Minister Benazir. In 1989, Prime Minister Benazir Bhutto controversially signed retirement papers and relieved him of command of the military in order to bring up army chief General Beg in his place. This move was seen as a political move and Benazir Bhutto's attempt to control the military through army and loyalist officers and was said to be a direct attack on the military by the political leader.

The retirement papers were deemed null and ineffective when Ghulam Ishaq Khan confirmed that Admiral Sirohey would complete his term until 1991 and handled the matters very efficiently. After the matter became public, Chairman joint chief Admiral Sirohey and army chief General Beg fell out with Prime Minister Benazir Bhutto as both suspected that the Prime Minister wanted to get rid of them. Admiral Sirohey became supportive of Ghulam Ishaq Khan's dismissal of Prime Minister Benazir Bhutto in 1990, and witnessed the inauguration of Nawaz Sharif as the prime minister.

In 1990, Admiral Sirohey arranged and held a state dinner for United States Central Command's commander General Norman Schwarzkopf where, together with army chief General Beg, he briefed the USCENTCOM on Pakistan Armed Forces battle preparations and military operational capabilities of Pakistan armed forces in Saudi contingent.

== Retirement ==
On 8 November 1991, Prime Minister Nawaz Sharif nominated General Shamim Alam as the next Chairman Joint Chiefs of Staff Committee and was confirmed by President Ghulam Ishaq.

On 9 November 1991, Admiral Sirohey retired from his forty-year-long military service when his term as chairman ended and was given a guard of honour by General Shamim Alam. Following his retirement, he also founded the Foundation for the Advancement of Engineering Sciences and Advanced Technologies— a think tank dedicated to promoting science and technology in the country where he was its chief executive. He was also the author of his autobiography, Truth Never Retires (1996) Jang Publishers, Lahore.

== Awards and decorations ==

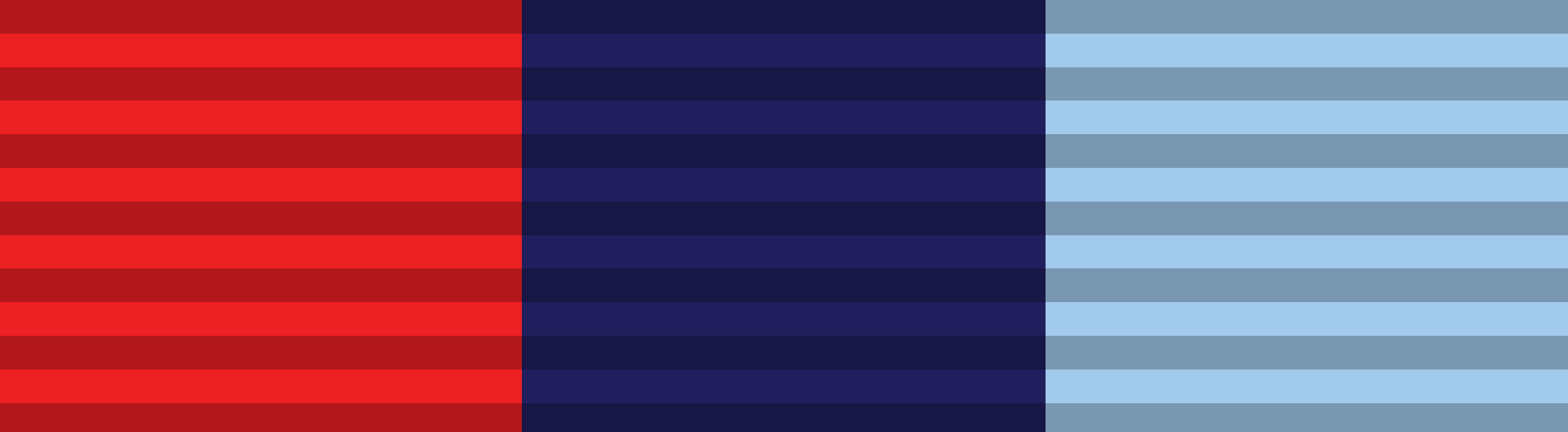

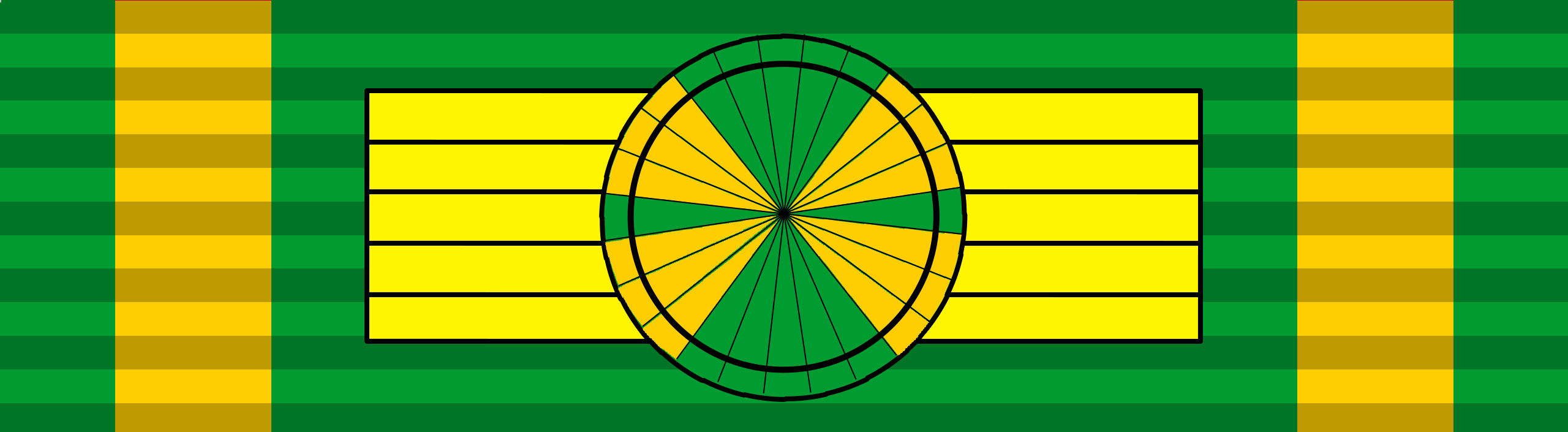

Nishan-e-Imtiaz (Military) (Order of Excellence)	Hilal-e-Imtiaz (Military) (Crescent of Excellence)		Sitara-e-Basalat (Star of Good Conduct)
Tamgha-e-Diffa (General Service Medal) Rann of Kutch Clasp	Sitara-e-Harb 1965 War (War Star 1965)	Sitara-e-Harb 1971 War (War Star 1971)	Tamgha-e-Jang 1965 War (War Medal 1965)
Tamgha-e-Jang 1971 War (War Medal 1971)	10 Years Service Medal	20 Years Service Medal	30 Years Service Medal
40 Years Service Medal	Tamgha-e-Sad Saala Jashan-e- Wiladat-e-Quaid-e-Azam (100th Birth Anniversary of Muhammad Ali Jinnah) 1976	Tamgha-e-Jamhuria (Republic Commemoration Medal) 1956	Hijri Tamgha (Hijri Medal) 1979
Jamhuriat Tamgha (Democracy Medal) 1988	Qarardad-e-Pakistan Tamgha (Resolution Day Golden Jubilee Medal) 1990	National Order of Merit (Grand Officer) (France)	Bintang Jalasena Utama (Indonesia)
Order of King Abdul Aziz (1st Class) (Saudi Arabia)	The Legion of Merit (Degree of Commander) (US)	Tong il Order of National Security Merit (South Korea)	Order of the Crown (Knight Grand Cross) (Thailand)

=== Foreign decorations ===
Foreign awards
France	National Order of Merit (Grand Officer)
Indonesia	Bintang Jalasena Utama
Saudi Arabia	Order of King Abdul Aziz (1st Class)
United States	The Legion of Merit (Degree of Commander)
South Korea	Tong il (Order of National Security Merit)
Thailand	Order of the Crown (Knight Grand Cross)

Military offices
Preceded by Tariq Kamal Khan	Chief of Naval Staff; 1986–1988	Succeeded by Yastur-ul-Haq Malik
Preceded by Akhtar Abdur Rahman	Chairman Joint Chiefs of Staff Committee; 1988–1991	Succeeded by Shamim Alam Khan
