= Mujeeb Ahmad Khan Lodhi =

Pakistani admiral and defence analyst

Rear Admiral Mujeeb Ahmed Khan Lodhi
- Born: 1924; Jalundhur, Punjab, British India
- Died: July 2017
- Military career
- Allegiance: (British Raj) British India (1941-47); Pakistan (1947-71)
- Branch: Royal Indian Navy; Pakistan Navy
- Service years: 1941–1971
- Rank: Rear Admiral
- Service number: PN. 77
- Unit: Executive Branch
- Commands: Commander Pakistan Fleet; Western Naval Command; Chittagong Port Authority; PNS Babur
- Conflicts: World War II; Indo-Pakistani War of 1965; Operation Somnath; Indo-Pakistani War of 1971
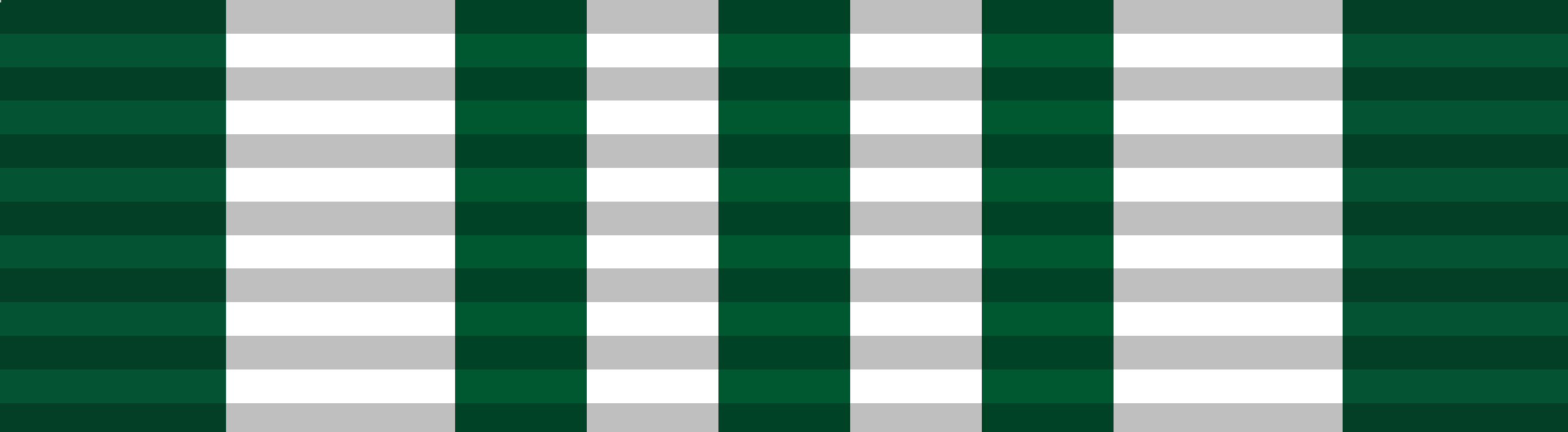
- Awards: Sitara-e-Jurat Tamgha-e-Pakistan
- Other work: Military adviser to Royal Saudi Navy; Author, columnist, and writer.

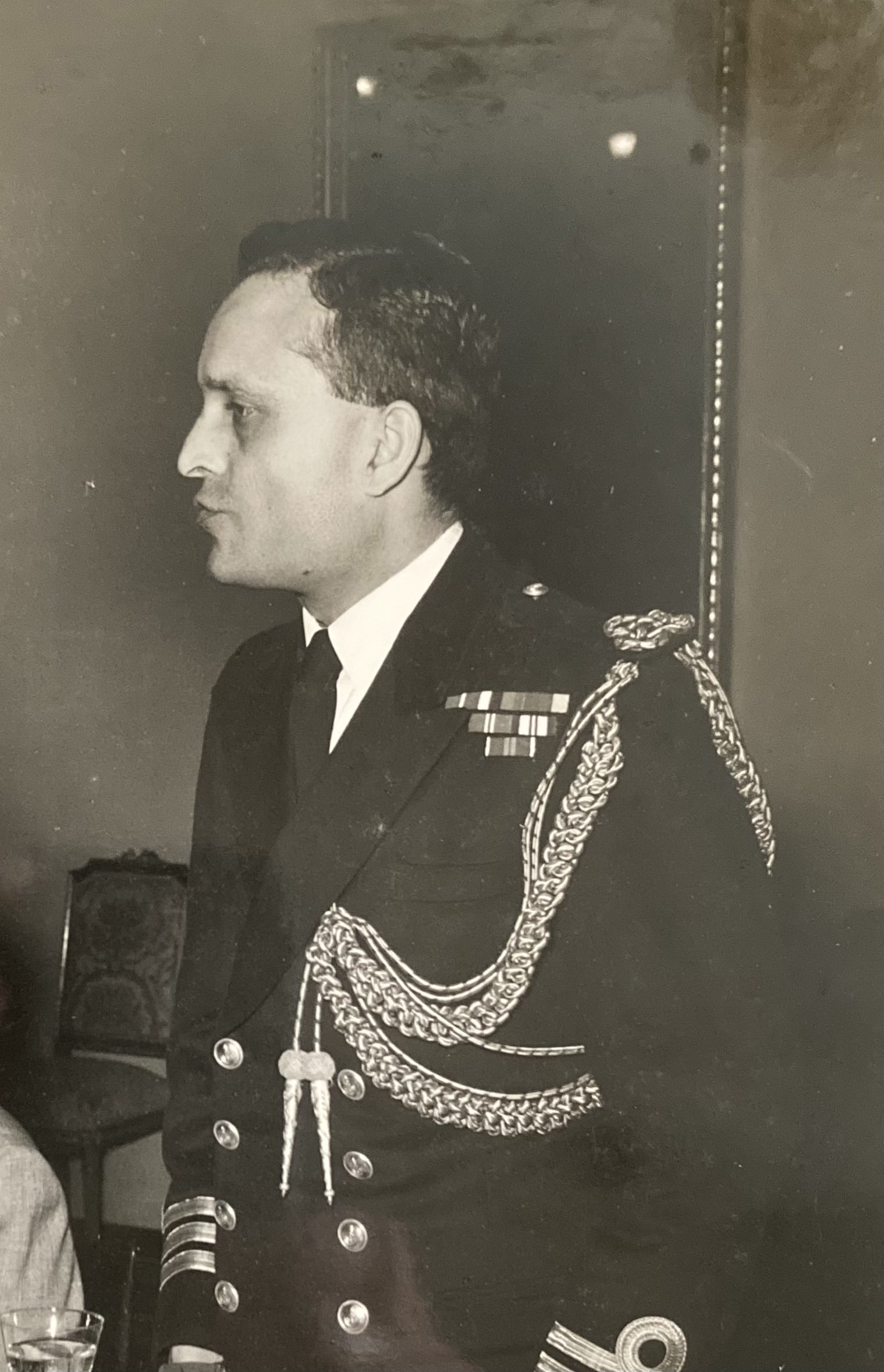
Dinner Party

Mujeeb Ahmad Khan Lodhi (1924 – July 2017), SJ, TPk, best known as M.A.K. Lodhi, was a two-star rank admiral in the Pakistan Navy, a memoirist, and a defence analyst, writing in the News International.

He is known for his leadership in commanding the Western Naval Command and fleet commander during the third war with India in 1971, and was forcefully retired from his service in 1972 by President Zulfikar Ali Bhutto. In 2017, he wrote and authored his memoirs, Ocean Rift: Memoirs of Admiral Lodhi, published in 2017 that recounted his memories during the events in 1971.

== Biography ==
Lodhi served in the Royal Indian Navy, participating well during the World War II, he was one of few of the twenty RIN officers from the Executive Branch who opted for Pakistan Navy in 1947; he was the lieutenant at the time of his transfer. He was a contemporary of Vice Admiral EC Kuruvila (1922–1997) with whom he served in World War II but were on opposite after the partition.

Lodhi participated well during the second war with India in 1965, was one of the commanding officers of the Combined Task Group (CTG) that raided in Dwarka in India. Captain Lodhi was the commanding officer of the PNS Babur and had responsibility of guarding the station. Under Captain Lodhi's command, the PNS Babur took part in the firing the target at the light house's radars and return home safely to report to its base, and served until 1967 as Babur's CO.

In 1969, Commodore Lodhi was stationed in East Pakistan and was appointed as administrator for the Chittagong Port, responsible for territorial limits. In 1970, he was promoted to two-star rank, rear-admiral, was subsequently appointed the fleet commander in the Western Naval Command as Commander Pakistan Fleet.

During the third war with India, Rear-admiral Lodhi commanded the Western Naval Command's Combined Task Group, comprising the one cruiser, five destroyers, two frigates, four submarines and one oiler. He also deployed his country's only long-range submarine, Ghazi that had to be deployed since he was not given any choice to support the Eastern Naval Command under Rear-admiral Mohammad Shariff. He also appointed Commodore H.H. Ahmed as his command's chief of staff.

After the signed surrender went into effect that marked the succession of East-Pakistan as Bangladesh, Rear-admiral Lodhi was among the highest flag ranking officer, including Rear-admiral Rashid Ahmed and Vice-admiral Muzaffar Hassan, who were notably superseded by their juniors for the command assignments. Rear-admiral Lodhi was subsequently forcefully retired from his service when the junior, Commodore H.H. Ahmed, became the nation's first chief of naval staff in April 1972.

After his retirement, Rear-admiral Lodhi deputed and worked with Royal Saudi Navy as its military adviser and remained associated with it for quite some time. Since 2015, he became associated with the News International where he writes column on defence and security.

In 2017, Lodhi's memoirs, Ocean Rift: Memoirs of Admiral Lodhi, were published. He died prior to October 2018.
