= Iqbal F. Qadir =

Pakistani military officer (died 2020)

Vice Admiral Iqbal F. Quadir

Pakistan Ambassador to Iran
- In office 1983–1985
- President: Zia-ul-Haq

Personal details
- Born: Iqbal Fazl Quadir
- Died: 19 October 2020
- Citizenship: Pakistan

Military service
- Allegiance: Pakistan
- Branch/service: Pakistan Navy
- Years of service: 1947-1983
- Rank: Vice Admiral
- Unit: Naval Operations Branch
- Commands: Vice-Chief of Naval Staff; DCNS(Ops); Flag Officer Sea Training
- Battles/wars: Indo-Pakistani War of 1965; Operation Dwarka; Bangladesh Liberation War; Indo-Pakistani War of 1971
- Awards: Hilal-i-Imtiaz; Tamgha-e-Imtiaz; Sitara-e-Basalat; Tamgha-e-Quaid-e-Azam

Iqbal Fazl Quadir (Urdu: اقبال فضل قادر) HI(M), TI(M), SBt, TQA, (died 19 October 2020) was a three-star rank admiral in the Pakistan Navy, diplomat and a defence analyst. He was renowned for his participation in Pakistan's second war with India when he was part of the flotilla that attacked the radar station in Dwarka, India.

== Biography ==
Having joined the Pakistan Navy in 1947, he progressed well in the Navy and was trained in signals in Britannia Royal Naval College in England before returning to Pakistan in 1954 where he served in the PNS Shamsher as Lieutenant.

In 1965, Commander Iqbal F. Quadir was among the commanding officers who were chosen to be a part of the flotilla led by Cdre. S.M. Anwar to attack the radar station in Dwarka, India, where he commanded the PNS Alamgir. Cdr. Quadir was in charge of the signals eventually helping to identify the targets for flotilla to launch the attack.

According to Cdr. Quadir, the Indian Navy's reconnaissance plane had flown over his ship and observed flight path of the plane in the radar, as it had flown over his ship, Babur and Badr but was unable to detect due to clouds covering the area. Upon returning to Pakistan, he was decorated with the gallantry award.

In 1971, Cdr. Quadir was stationed in East, and was taken as war prisoner by the Indian Army and was repatriated back to Pakistan in 1974. Upon returning to Pakistan, he continued to serve in the Navy and eventually was promoted to the commanding ranks in the Navy. In the 1970s, Capt. Quadir served in the Navy NHQ as Chief of Staff (COS) for Commander of Pakistan Fleet (COMPAK). In 1978, Rear-Admiral Quadir was appointed as Commander of Karachi (COMKAR). In 1980, he was promoted to three-star rank, Vice-Admiral, in the Pakistan Navy and tenured as the Vice-Chief of Naval Staff under Adm. Karamat Rahman Niazi, the chief of naval staff.

In 1983, Vice-Admiral Quadir was superseded by junior Rear-Admiral T.K. Khan for the four-star rank promotion, since the Rear-Admiral Khan had been known to be close to President Zia and had experience in military administration in civil affairs from the East Pakistan, that may have been a factor for his appointment to the four-star rank. After his appointment was announced, Rear-Admiral Tariq Kamal Khan was appointed as four-star rank admiral in the Navy.

After his seeking retirement in 1983, Quadir was appointed as ambassador and served in various countries as a diplomat. He was a prolific contributor in Defence Journal. Since 2015, he appeared in television news media to eulogize the events in 1965.

Qadir died on 19 October 2020.
