= K. M. Hussain =

K. M. Hussain SJ
- Born: Khateeb Maqsood Hussain; 1927; Hyderabad, Hyderabad State
- Relatives: S. M. Ahsan
- Military career
- Allegiance: Pakistan
- Branch: Pakistan Navy
- Service years: 1947-1977
- Rank: Commodore
- Service number: PN No. 219
- Unit: Surface Fleet Squadron
- Commands: PNS Babur; PNS Jahangir; PNS Momin M161 1962; Commander Karachi (COMKAR); Commander North (COMNOR); Chief of Staff
- Conflicts: Indo-Pakistani War of 1965; Operation Dwarka; Indo-Pakistani War of 1971
- Awards: Sitara-e-Jurat (1971)

Khateeb Maqsood Hussain (born 1927), best known as K. M. Hussain, is a retired one-star rank naval officer and a war veteran, who is known for his participation in Indo-Pakistani wars and conflicts. He is most known as the captain commander of PNS Babur and was the senior commanding officer of the Operation Dwarka. He served as Pakistan's Ambassador to Lebanon from 1977 to June 1980.

== Early life ==
Khateeb Maqsood Hussain was born in Hyderabad. He was related to S. M. Ahsan.

== Service years ==
From 1967 to 1970, Captain Hussain was the Naval Adviser to the High Commission of Pakistan, London. During Operation Dwarka, Commander Hussain commanded the Pakistani destroyer PNS Jahangir.

In 1977, Commodore Hussain retired from the Navy and received honorable discharge from the navy. After retiring from Navy, Hussain joined Karachi Port Trust and associated himself with private Merchant navy. He briefly speaks and advocate for naval and marine safety in many different seminar.

He served as Pakistan's Ambassador to Lebanon (accredited to Cyprus) from 1977 to 15 June 1980.

As of today, Hussain lives in Islamabad where he lives a normal life.
