= Tariq Kamal Khan =

Admiral and Chief of Naval Staff, Pakistan Navy (born 1933)

Admiral Tariq Kamal Khan NI(M) HI(M) SI(M) LoM
- طارق کمال خان

Chief of Naval Staff
- In office 23 March 1983 – 9 April 1986
- Preceded by: Adm K.R. Niazi
- Succeeded by: Adm Iftikhar Ahmed Sirohey

Pakistan Ambassador to Tunisia
- In office 1993–1995
- Preceded by: Dilshad Najmuddin
- Succeeded by: Shamoon Alam Khan

High Commissioner of Pakistan to Australia
- In office 1986–1992
- President: Zia-ul-Haq

Personal details
- Born: Tariq Kamal Khan; January 23, 1933 (age 93) Jhelum, Punjab, British India (present day Pakistan)
- Citizenship: Pakistan
- Nicknames: TK Khan; Metal Gear

Military service
- Allegiance: Pakistan
- Branch: Pakistan Navy
- Service years: 1948–1986
- Rank: Admiral
- Unit: Surface Branch
- Commands: Vice Chief of Naval Staff; Commander Karachi coast; Naval attaché, Pakistan Embassy, London
- Conflicts: Indo-Pakistani War of 1965; Indo-Pakistani War of 1971; Bangladesh Liberation War
- Awards: Nishan-e-Imtiaz; Hilal-e-Imtiaz; Sitara-e-Imtiaz; Legion of Merit

Tariq Kamal Khan (Note: Urdu: طارق کمال خان) NI(M) HI(M) SI(M) LoM; (born 23 January 1933), is a retired four-star rank admiral who served as the 9th Chief of Naval Staff (CNS) of Pakistan Navy from being appointed in 1983 until retiring from his service in 1986.

Prior to that, he was appointed as the High Commissioner of Pakistan to Australia and served from 1986 until 1992, when he retired from the foreign service.

== Biography ==
=== Early life, education and naval career ===
Education: Presentation Convent Murree; St Anthony's High School Lahore (Senior Cambridge 1948); Government College Lahore. Bsc 1954 Karachi University.

Joined Pakistan Navy September 1951. Joined Royal Naval College Dartmouth UK May 1952 Trained in UK and was commissioned as sub lieutenant on 1 September 1954. Lieutenant 1 April 1957 Served as navigator PNS Badr and XO minesweeper PNS Mubarak. Qualified Underwater Swimming School US June 1960. Qualified Underwater Demolition Team (USN SEALS) US October 1960. Qualified parachutist Fort Benning Georgia US November 1960. Attached with Special Service Group (Army) at Cherat April to November 1961. Qualified Torpedo & Anti-Submarine Specialist UK November 1962. TAS Officer PNS Alamgir December 62 to November 63.

As lieutenant commander served as deputy director PN Tactical School end 1963 to early 1965. Executive officer PNS Jahangir 1965 throughout The Rann of Kutch and 1965 War. Staff officer operations NHQ 1966. Raised and commanded Special Service Group (Navy) 1967–1969. Commanded the Minesweeping Squadron and PNS Mubarak as COMINRON before assuming command of destroyer PNS Jahangir in East Pakistan on 18 March 1971. Brought the ship back to W Pakistan in July 1971 and was in command till immediately after the ceasefire of the 1971 War. Appointed Director Naval Operations NHQ end December 1971. Commanded cruiser PNS Babur April to September 1973. Assumed command of PN Destroyer Badr as COMDESRON in September 1973.

Naval attaché London August 1974 to December 1977. Director naval warfare and operational plans NHQ 1978. Joined Royal College of Defence Studies London January 1979 as commodore and graduated December 1979. March 1980 appointed Assistant Chief of Naval Staff (Operations) NHQ. Appointed Commander Pakistan Fleet early 1981. Promoted rear admiral early 1982 and appointed Commander Karachi.

Promoted vice admiral 23 March 1983 and appointed Chief of The Naval Staff. Promoted admiral 23 March 1984. Retired 10 April 1986.

=== Naval career and star appointments ===
Tariq Kemal Khan was born in Domeli, Dist Jhelum, Punjab, British India into a Gakhar Kayani family on 21 May 1930. He is son of Col Sir Sher Mohammad Khan. After graduating from a local high school, he was commissioned as Midshipman in the Pakistan Navy in 1948 in Surface warfare branch and was initially trained at the Pakistan Military Academy. He was later trained in the United Kingdom as a communication specialist and as the surface warfare officer and promoted as Sub-Lieutenant after returning to Pakistan. His further military training came from the Britannia Royal Naval College in Dartmouth, England and did qualified on courses on military communications.

In 1965, Lieutenant TK Khan participated in second war with India and served on PNS Shah Jahan as its executive officer while taking part on naval shelling in Dwarka, India.

In 1969, he was promoted as lieutenant-commander and commander after posting in East Pakistan as commanding officer of Jahangir. Cdr TK Khan also helped the Pakistan Army with the communication gears and firing at the East Pakistan Rifles headquarters to crush Bengali resistance in Chittagong area.

Cdr Khan participated on various military riverine missions while commanding a gunboat, Jahangir, and was taken war prisoner after the accessioning of the surrender with India in 1971. He was repatriated to Pakistan and continue resuming his military service when he was promoted as Captain in the Navy.

From 1975 to 1978, Captain Khan was posted in the Foreign ministry to be served as naval attaché to the Pakistan High Commission in London, United Kingdom. Upon returning to Pakistan, he was promoted to one-star rank, Commodore and posted in Karachi for a command assignment in 1978.

Cdre Khan commanded the 18th Destroyer Squadron as its officer commanding until 1980 after promoting as rear-admiral.

=== Chief of Naval Staff ===
Rear-Admiral Khan was appointed Commander Karachi (COMKAR) until 1983 when he succeeded Admiral K.R. Niazi as Chief of Naval Staff. On 22 March 1983, President Zia-ul-Haq announced to appoint Rear-Admiral Khan as the Chief of Naval Staff but this promotion came with controversy. Rear-Admiral TK Khan, a junior admiral, supersedes the most senior Vice-Admiral Iqbal Quadir and two senior Rear-Admirals for the command of the Navy in 1983. Rear-Admiral TK Khan was known to be close to President Zia and had experience in military administration in civil affairs from the East Pakistan, that may have been a factor for his appointment to the four-star appointment. After his appointment was announced, Rear-Admiral Tariq Kemal Khan was appointed as four-star rank admiral in the Navy.

In 1983, he helped negotiated the acquisition of Mirage V aircraft from France for the Pakistan Air Force when he traveled to Paris, France.

As naval chief, Admiral TK Khan began initiating a program to acquire and procure modern warships to replace and scrap the aging warships in service with the Navy. Admiral Tariq Kemal worked closely towards strengthening bilateral relations between China and Pakistan, briefly meeting with Chinese President Li Xiannian for that purpose in 1984.

Admiral Tariq Kemal Khan remained naval chief until naval chief he sought retirement from his active service and handed over the command to his VCNS, Vice-Admiral Iftikhar Ahmed Sirohey.

=== Decorations and awards ===
- 1965 Imtiazi Sanad (Mention in Dispatches)
- 1969 TQA
- 1982 HI(M)
- 1983 NI(M)
- 1985 Legion of Merit (Commander) USA

=== Diplomatic assignments ===
July 1986 to July 1990 Ambassador / High Commissioner Australia with concurrent accreditation to New Zealand & Fiji.

Jan 1992 to Aug 1992 Ambassador Yugoslavia.

May 1993 to May 1995 Ambassador Tunisia.

== Awards and decorations ==

Nishan-e-Imtiaz (Military) (Order of Excellence)	Hilal-e-Imtiaz (Military) (Crescent of Excellence)	Sitara-e-Imtiaz (Military) (Star of Excellence)	Tamgha-e-Diffa (General Service Medal): 1. 1965 War Clasp; 2. 1971 War Clasp
Sitara-e-Harb 1965 War (War Star 1965)	Sitara-e-Harb 1971 War (War Star 1971)	Tamgha-e-Jang 1965 War (War Medal 1965)	Tamgha-e-Jang 1971 War (War Medal 1971)
Tamgha-e-Sad Saala Jashan-e- Wiladat-e-Quaid-e-Azam (100th Birth Anniversary of Muhammad Ali Jinnah) 1976	Tamgha-e-Jamhuria (Republic Commemoration Medal) 1956	Hijri Tamgha (Hijri Medal) 1979	The Legion of Merit (Degree of Commander) (United States)

=== Foreign Decorations ===
Foreign awards
USA	The Legion of Merit (Degree of Commander)

== See also ==
- Pakistan Navy
- Chairman Joint Chiefs of Staff Committee (Pakistan)
- Chief of Army Staff (Pakistan)
- Chief of Air Staff (Pakistan)

== Footnotes ==
Military offices
Preceded by Karamat Rahman Niazi	Chief of Naval Staff; 1983 – 1986	Succeeded by Iftikhar Ahmed Sirohey
