= Shamoon Alam Khan =

Pakistani retired admiral

Vice Admiral Shamoon Alam Khan HI(M) SJ

Pakistan Ambassador to Ukraine
- In office 2002–2004
- President: Pervez Musharraf
- Prime Minister: Zafarullah Jamali

Pakistan Ambassador to Tunisia
- In office 1995–1997
- Preceded by: Tariq Kamal Khan
- Succeeded by: Jawaid Iqbal

Personal details
- Born: Shamoon Allam Shillong, Assam, British India (Present-day Meghalaya, India)
- Citizenship: Pakistan
- Relations: Shamim Alam Khan (Older brother)

Military service
- Allegiance: Pakistan
- Branch/service: Pakistan Navy
- Years of service: 1955-1995
- Rank: Vice Admiral
- Commands: Pakistan Fleet; Cmdnt Joint Staff College; Pakistan Naval Academy; Naval attaché at Pakistan Embassy, Beijing
- Battles/wars: Indo-Pakistani War of 1965; Bangladesh Liberation War; Indo-Pakistani War of 1971
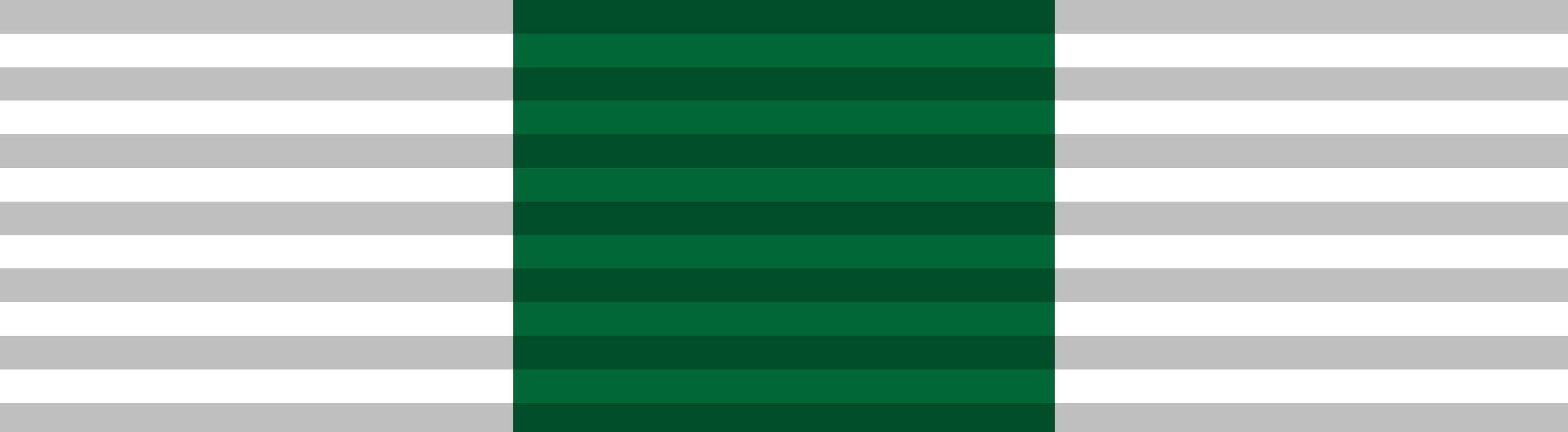
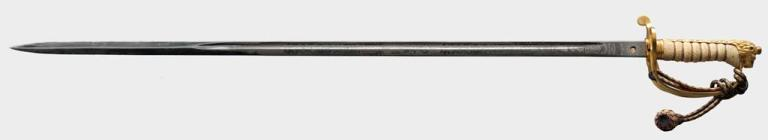
- Awards: Hilal-i-Imtiaz Sitara-i-Jurat Sword of Honour

Shamoon Alam Khan (Urdu: شمعون عالم) is a retired three-star rank admiral in the Pakistan Navy.

== Biography ==
Shamoon Alam Khan was born in Shillong, Meghalaya in India, into an Urdu-speaking family, and his father, Mahboob Alam Khan, was an officer in the Indian Civil Service who worked at an administration position at the Survey of India. His mother, Nisa Begum, was a housewife. His father, Mahboob Alam, had nine children with Nisa among all joined the respected branches of the Pakistan Armed Forces. His older brother, Shamim was a career officer who became Chairman Joint Chiefs of Staff Committee in the 1990s.

After the partition of India in 1947, the Allam family moved from Bangalore to Rawalpindi via train, where the Alam brothers witnessed the violence and riots that were taking place in the trains at the time of the partition in 1947. Eventually, Mahboob Alam found the employment at the Survey of Pakistan.

After his matriculation, Shamoon, along with Shamim, went to attend the Lawrence College where he earned the diploma. In 1955, he joined the Pakistan Navy and was selected to be trained at the Britannia Royal Naval College at Dartmouth in United Kingdom, trained as a surface officer.

In the 1960s, Lt. Shamoon served as an Executive officer at various surface warships, and participated in the naval offence against the Indian Navy during the second war with India in 1965. In 1967, Lt. Shamoon joined the Inter-Services Intelligence (ISI), and was posted in East Pakistan, working on the intelligence gathering. For a short period of time, Lieutenant-Commander Shamoon provided and ran a short training course to the junior officers graduating from the Naval Academy in Karachi at the PNS Babur near the Bay of Bengal.

In 1970–71, Lt-Cdr. Shamoon moved his ISI office in Comilla, and took participation in briefing the formations of Pakistan Marines and special forces of Army and Navy to commence offence on approaching Indian Army. During the height of the civil insurgency in East-Pakistan, Lt-Cdr. Shamoon volunteered into the entrance in the Navy Special Service Group and was a commanding officer of the Navy SEAL Team that conducted a reconnaissance mission to gain knowledge on the Indian Army's movement near the Rangamati, leading to insert the Pakistan Marines battalions, and later made a way to secure intelligence on the Kaptai Dam.

In 1971, Lt-Cdr. Shamoon was taken war prisoner by Indian Army after the unilateral surrender was signed and expatriated to Pakistan in 1973. In 1974, Cdr. Shamoon remained associated with the ISI for remainder of his career, and was directed to attend the Armed Forces War College (afwc) at the National Defence University, and attained MSc in War studies in the class of 1976.

His first diplomatic assignment included Capt. Shamoon's appointment as a Naval attache' at the Pakistan Embassy in Beijing in 1981. In 1983, Capt. Shamoon was promoted as a one-star rank admiral in the Navy, and was selected to attend a year-long staff course at the Royal College of Defence Studies (RCDS) in London. Upon returning, Cdre. Shamoon was appointed commandant of the Pakistan Naval Academy in Karachi in 1987–88, and later served as commandant of the Joint Staff College in Chaklala.

In the 1990s, Rear-Admiral Shamoon's two-star rank assignments included his role as DCNS (Training) at the Navy NHQ. In 1993, R-Adm. Shamoon was promoted to the three-star rank, and eventually appointed senior fleet commander of the Pakistan Fleet. V-Adm. Shamoon played a vital role increasing the security role of the ISI in sea-based operations while strengthening coastal defence by empowering the MSA's capabilities in search and rescue operations. In 1995, V-Adm. Shamoon eventually sought his retirement after completing 40-years of military service.

After his retirement, Shamoon joined the Foreign Service, and was appointed Pakistan Ambassador to Tunisia in 1995, which he served until 1997. In 2001, Shamoon was appointed and sent as a Pakistan Ambassador to Ukraine, which he served until 2004.

== See also ==
- Inter-Services Intelligence in East Pakistan
