= S. M. Anwar =

Commodore Pakistan Navy

Commodore Sheikh Mohammad Anwar
- Born: Shiekh Mohammad Anwar; 20 September 1920; Lahore, Punjab, British India (present-day Pakistan)
- Died: 24 January 1979 (aged 58); Karachi, Sindh, Pakistan
- Military career
- Allegiance: (British Raj) British India (1941–47); Pakistan (1947–77)
- Branch: Royal Indian Navy Pakistan Navy
- Service years: 1941–1977
- Rank: Commodore
- Service number: PN No. 24
- Unit: Naval Operations Branch
- Commands: Commander Pakistan Fleet; Pakistan Marines; 25th Destroyer Squadron; Pakistan Merchant Navy
- Conflicts: Second World War; Burma campaign (1942–1943); Indo-Pakistani War of 1965; Operation Dwarka
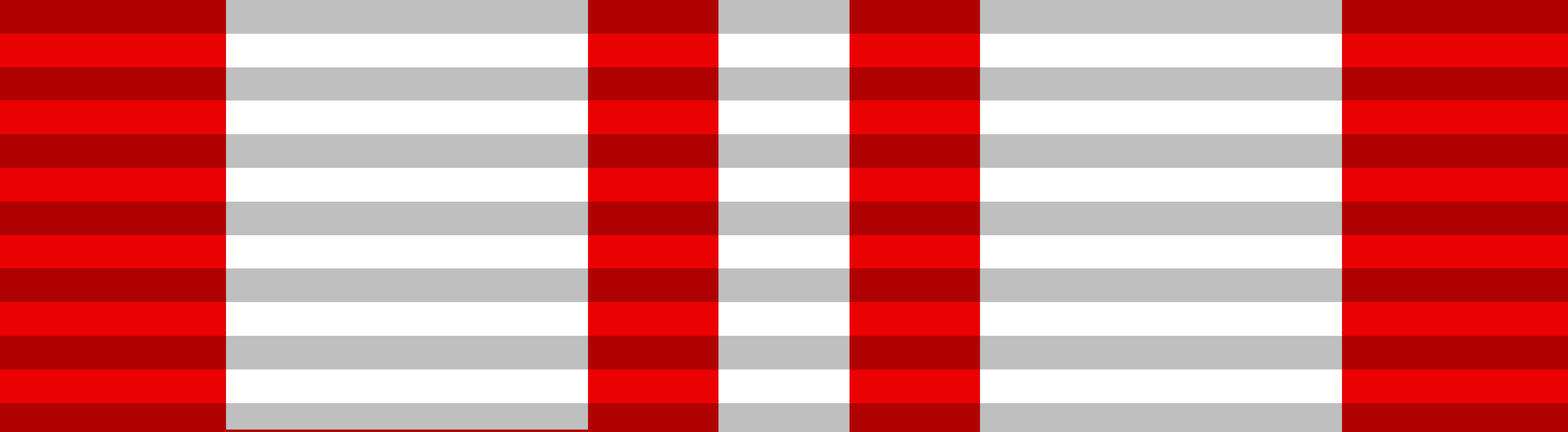
- Awards: Legion of Merit Sitara-i-Khidmat

Commodore Sheikh Mohammad Anwar LOM, SK (Urdu: شيخ محمد انور ; 19 September 1920 – 24 January 1979), popularly known as SM Anwar, was a Pakistani one-star rank admiral who is known for his role as officer in tactical command of the 25th Destroyer Squadron that attack and raided the radar station in Dwarka in Gujarat during the Indo-Pakistani War of 1965.

Despite his feat, Anwar's accomplishment in the Navy was not well known. He died in Karachi in 1979

. It was only in the 1990s when his role as war hero was highlighted when ISPR released the telefilm of the same name of the operation. After much literary criticism by media and veterans, his achievements were recognized in 2010s.

== Biography ==
Sheikh Mohammad Anwar was born in Lahore, Punjab, India, on 12 September 1920. After his matriculation, he was educated at the Forman Christian College University in Lahore, graduating in 1940.

He joined and commissioned in the Royal Indian Navy as a Sub-Lieutenant in 1941, and briefly served in World War II's Burma theatre in 1942–43. After the India's partition that resulted in the independence of Pakistan on 14 August 1947, Lt Anwar joined the Pakistan Navy, and was directed to attend the Naval War College in Rhodes Island, United States, in 1958. After graduating from the Naval War College in 1959, Cdr. Anwar served as an exchange officer in the United States Navy's surface warships for two months. In 1960, Cdr Anwar served as base commander for the PNS Bahadur, a training establishment.

In 1962, Capt. Anwar was appointed by the Ministry of Defence (MoD) for a diplomatic assignment, and briefly tenured as naval attaché at the Embassy of Pakistan in Washington, D.C. in the United States until 1964.

In 1965, Anwar was appointed as senior fleet commander when he took over the command of the Pakistan Fleet (COMPAK). During the second war with India in 1965, Cdre. Anwar was the officer in tactical command of the 25th Destroyer Squadron who led the attack and raid radar station used by the Indian Air Force in Dwarka, Gujarat in India.

In 1968, the United States honoured him with their highest military award, the Legion of Merit, presented by then-U.S. Ambassador to Pakistan Eugene Locke. In 1969, he was appointed as chairman of Karachi Port Trust which he remained until 1970.

In 1971, Cdre. Anwar served in the command of the Marines Corps for a short period, and was later appointed as commandant of the Pakistan Marine Academy until 1975.

Despite his role and heroic feats in 1965 war, his role in the Navy was less known and was hardly recognised in the Navy. He was unknown to the public, and it was not until 1990s when the ISPR highlighted his role as a war hero when releasing the telefilm bearing the same name of operation that was aired on the STN; his role was played by Talat Hussain in the 1990s.

His death also went unnoticed in 1979, and it was only in 2016, when the Pakistan Navy officially recognised his services on their official page on Facebook.
