= John Adams (Royal Navy officer, died 2008) =

Royal Navy officer

Rear-Admiral John Adams CB LVO
- Rear Admiral Adams in August 1967.
- Born: 19 December 1918; Newcastle upon Tyne, England
- Died: 3 November 2008 (aged 89)
- Military career
- Allegiance: United Kingdom
- Branch: Royal Navy
- Service years: 1936–68
- Rank: Rear-Admiral
- Commands: HMS Albion (1964–66); 3rd Submarine Squadron (1958–59); HMY Britannia (1954–57); HMS Creole (1950)
- Conflicts: Second World War; Indonesia–Malaysia confrontation
- Awards: Companion of the Order of the Bath; Lieutenant of the Royal Victorian Order; Mentioned in Despatches
- Other work: Paper industry

Rear-Admiral John Harold Adams, CB, LVO (19 December 1918 – 3 November 2008) was a Royal Navy officer who commanded HMS Albion during the Indonesia–Malaysia confrontation. Following his retirement in 1968, he served as Assistant Chief of Naval Staff (Policy) and chairman of the Future Fleet Working Party. He advocated for the development of "through-deck cruisers" capable of carrying vertical take-off jet fighters and helicopters, which led to the launch of HMS Invincible in 1977. He was appointed as a Member of the Fourth Class of the Royal Victorian Order (MVO; later known as Lieutenant of the Royal Victoria Order, LVO) in 1957 and a Companion of the Order of the Bath (CB) in 1968.

== Early life ==
Adams was born in Newcastle upon Tyne on 19 December 1918. He attended Glenalmond College in Perth and Kinross, Scotland and joined the Royal Navy as a special entry cadet in 1936. After eight months of training he joined the Revenge-class battleship Royal Oak.

== Naval career ==
After the outbreak of the Second World War, Adams was assigned to the destroyer Walker. On 11 September 1939, Walker ran down and went through her sister ship, Vanquisher, and was jammed in her. As the weather and conditions were good, both ships were able to be saved. During the crisis, Adams carried Vanquisher's safe with its confidential material inside to the deck of Walker, but found that after the situation had calmed down the next morning that he was unable to lift it.

He served on the Hunt-class destroyer Cleveland in 1941 and saw action in the Western Approaches of the coast of Great Britain, as part of the St. Nazaire Raid and the landings of Allied troops in North Africa and Sicily. He underwent training and qualified as a torpedo and electrics specialist in 1943, and was able to use this knowledge to prepare escorts for convoys crossing the North Atlantic. On 15 December 1942 he was Mentioned in Despatches for his actions aboard Cleveland in an engagement with E-Boats.

After the war, he commanded the destroyer Creole and served in the Admiralty's torpedo and anti-submarine warfare division, among other staff appointments. He was promoted to lieutenant commander on 1 June 1948, and commander on 31 December 1950. He was then appointed the executive commander of the Royal Yacht Britannia, which included taking Princess Margaret to the West Indies, Queen Elizabeth II to Portugal and a world tour for Prince Philip, Duke of Edinburgh, serving from 1954 to 1957. As a result, he was appointed a Member of the Fourth Class of the Royal Victorian Order in the 1957 Queen's Birthday Honours. He was promoted captain on 31 December 1956.

Adams commanded Albion from May 1964 to January 1966. The ship was deployed in the Indian Ocean and the Far East. She arrived east of Suez with 848 Naval Air Squadron and a strong force of Royal Marines. During the Indonesia–Malaysia confrontation, Albion sent two flights of Wessex helicopters to support marine and army border patrols from bases in Borneo and Sarawak. He was promoted rear admiral on 7 January 1966.

In 1966, serving as Assistant Chief of Naval Staff (Policy), Adams was assigned to the Ministry of Defence and became chairman of the Future Fleet Working Party, reporting to Admiral of the Fleet Sir Varyl Begg. Building on his experience with the Albion, Adams' working party recommended a "through-deck cruiser" that would carry vertical take-off jet fighters and deploy helicopters, insisting that this approach was the logical conclusion of his research. Begg, who believed that missiles would replace planes, exploded with anger and rejected Adams's report publicly. Begg told him that he would never be employed again. Adams retired on 12 February 1968, and was appointed a Companion of the Order of the Bath (CB) in that year's Queen's Birthday Honours, but was invited to the launch of the aircraft carrier Invincible in 1977, which was a vindication of his approach.

== Company director and later life ==
After leaving the Royal Navy, Adams served as Director of the Paper and Paper Products Industry Training Board from 1968 to 1971. From 1972 to 1973, he was Director of the Employers' Federation of Papermakers and Boardmakers and then served from 1974 to 1983 as Director General of the British Paper and Board Industry Federation.

Adams was the author of The Adventure of Charlie the Cone, stories about a traffic cone that he made up for his children during long car trips.

He married the former Mary Parker in 1943. The two had one son and the marriage ended in 1961. He married Ione Eadie later in 1961 and had two sons and two daughters together.

Adams died on 3 November 2008 (aged 89).
