= Yastur-ul-Haq Malik =

Pakistani admiral (1931–2024)

Admiral Yastur-ul-Haq NI(M) HI(M) SBt

Chief of Naval Staff
- In office 10 November 1988 – 8 November 1991
- President: Ghulam Ishaq Khan
- Prime Minister: Benazir Bhutto; Nawaz Sharif
- Preceded by: Adm. Iftikhar Ahmed Sirohey
- Succeeded by: Adm. S.M. Khan

Chairman of PNSC
- In office 1 November 1986 – 8 November 1988
- President: Muhammad Zia-ul-Haq; Ghulam Ishaq Khan
- Prime Minister: Muhammad Khan Junejo

Personal details
- Born: Yasturul Haq Malik; 20 March 1934
- Died: 3 December 2024 (aged 92) Lahore, Punjab, Pakistan

Military service
- Allegiance: Pakistan
- Branch: Pakistan Navy
- Service years: 1951–1991
- Rank: Admiral
- Unit: Surface Branch
- Commands: Vice-Chief of Naval Staff; DCNS (Personnel); Commander Pakistan Fleet; Naval attaché, Pakistan Embassy, London
- Conflicts: Indo-Pakistani war of 1965; Indo-Pakistani war of 1971
- Awards: Nishan-e-Imtiaz; Hilal-e-Imtiaz; Sitara-e-Basalat

Yastur-ul-Haq Malik NI(M) HI(M) SBt (Urdu: یسطور الحق ملک; 24 December 1931 – 3 December 2024), NI(M), SBt, was a four-star rank admiral who served as the Chief of Naval Staff (CNS) of Pakistan Navy from 10 November 1988 until retiring from his military service on 8 November 1991. Malik died on 3 December 2024.

== Naval career and education ==
Yastur-ul-Haq Malik was born on 20 March 1934. His family origins are from Lucknow.

He attended and graduated from the Saint Patrick's College in Karachi and gained commissioned as Midshipman in 1951 and inducted in the Surface Branch of the Pakistan Navy in 1954. After his initial training at the Pakistan Military Academy, he was sent to United Kingdom to attend the Britannia Royal Naval College at Dartmouth where he graduated and further trained with the Royal Navy in 1958.

Upon returning to Pakistan in 1958, he was promoted as Lieutenant and provided his services as gunnery in the PNS Badr and participated in second war with India in 1965. He briefly served as a staff member of the military secretary's team in the Ayub administration and was an ADC to President Ayub Khan in 1960s.

He then participated in third war with India in 1971 as Lieutenant-Commander while stationed in Karachi.

After the war in 1971, Lt.Cdr. Malik went to attend the Air War College of Pakistan Air Force where he graduated with a staff course degree. He also attended the National Defence University and graduated with master's degree in Defence studies.

== Staff appointments and Chief of naval staff ==
Throughout his career, Malik served in the administrative branches of the Pakistan Navy and was once posted as the Naval attaché at Pakistan Embassy, Paris in France.

In 1980s, he assumed the command of Pakistan Fleet as its commander (COMPAK) from 1977 until 1982 but was later posted in Navy NHQ as DCNS (Personnel) from 1982 to 1984. His command assignments also included his role as Vice Chief of Naval Staff (VCNS) from 1984 until 1986 before being appointed Chairman of the Pakistan National Shipping Corporation (PNSC) in 1986.

In 1988, Prime Minister Benazir Bhutto announced his appointment as Chief of Naval Staff and Vice-Admiral Malik took over the command of Navy from Admiral Iftikhar Ahmed Sirohey who was elevated as Chairman of the Joint Chiefs of Staff Committee on 10 November 1988.

His tenure only ran for two years and left the command of the Navy to his VCNS Vice-Admiral S.M. Khan who was promoted as Admiral on 11 August 1991. As Chief of Naval Staff, Admiral Malik is credited with commissioning the "PNS Ahsan"— the naval base which is situated in Ormara, Balochistan in Pakistan.

== Awards and decorations ==

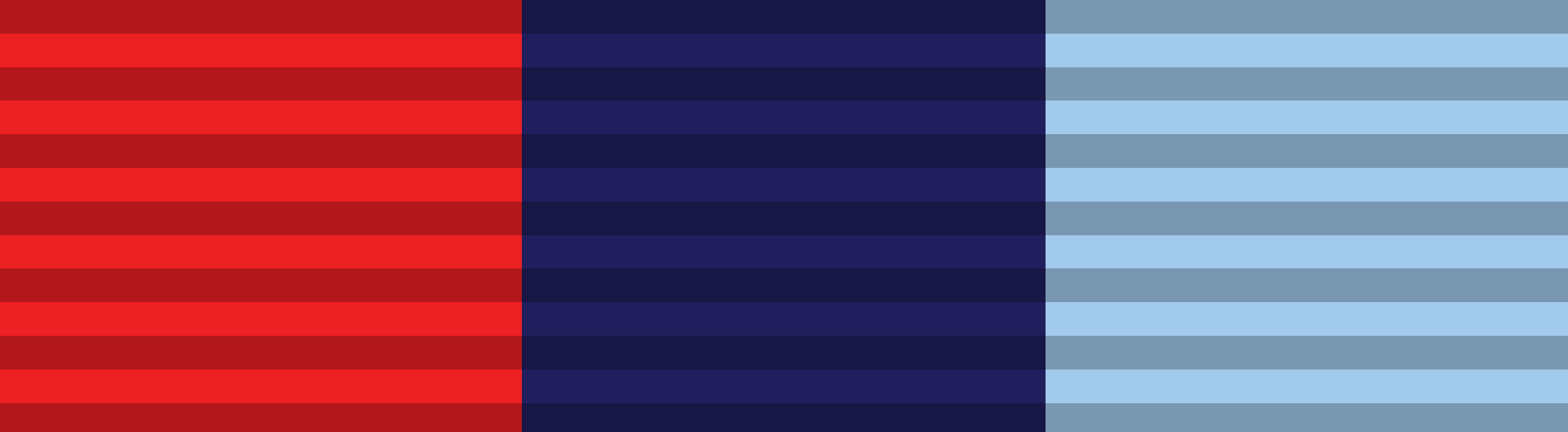

| | Nishan-e-Imtiaz (Military) (Order of Excellence) | | |
| Hilal-e-Imtiaz (Military) (Crescent of Excellence) | Sitara-e-Basalat (Star of Good Conduct) | Tamgha-e-Diffa (General Service Medal): 1. 1965 War Clasp; 2. 1971 War Clasp | Sitara-e-Harb 1965 War (War Star 1965) |
| Sitara-e-Harb 1971 War (War Star 1971) | Tamgha-e-Jang 1965 War (War Medal 1965) | Tamgha-e-Jang 1971 War (War Medal 1971) | 10 Years Service Medal |
| 20 Years Service Medal | 30 Years Service Medal | 40 Years Service Medal | Tamgha-e-Sad Saala Jashan-e- Wiladat-e-Quaid-e-Azam (100th Birth Anniversary of Muhammad Ali Jinnah) 1976 |
| Tamgha-e-Jamhuria (Republic Commemoration Medal) 1956 | Hijri Tamgha (Hijri Medal) 1979 | Jamhuriat Tamgha (Democracy Medal) 1988 | Qarardad-e-Pakistan Tamgha (Resolution Day Golden Jubilee Medal) 1990 |

Military offices
| Preceded by Iftikhar Ahmed Sirohey | Chief of Naval Staff; 1988–1991 | Succeeded by Saeed Mohammad Khan |
