= R82 =

R82 may refer to:

- R82 (South Africa), a road
- HMS Creole (R82), a destroyer of the Royal Navy
- Romano R.82, a French aerobatic trainer aircraft
