= Ahmad Zamir =

Vice Admiral Ahmad Zamir HI(M) SJ

Managing Director of Karachi Shipyard and Engineering
- In office 1983 – 1985

Secretary of Defence Productions
- In office 19 April 1981 – 8 August 1982
- Preceded by: Tariq Mustafa
- Succeeded by: Abdul Majid Mufti

Personal details
- Born: Zamir Ahmad; 30 April 1930 Delhi, India
- Died: 9 September 1985 (aged 55) Karachi, Pakistan
- Resting place: Military cemetery in Karachi
- Citizenship: Pakistan
- Relations: Khurshid Ahmad (younger brother)

Military service
- Allegiance: Pakistan
- Branch/service: Pakistan Navy
- Years of service: 1950-1985
- Rank: Vice Admiral (PN No. 325)
- Unit: Executive Branch
- Commands: DCNS(Ops); Commander Pakistan Fleet; Naval Intelligence; CO Pakistan Marines East
- Battles/wars: Indo-Pakistani War of 1965; Bangladesh Liberation War
- Awards: Hilal-i-Imtiaz; Sitara-i-Jurat

Ahmad Zamir (Urdu: احمد ضمير; 30 April 1930 – 9 September 1985), HI(M), SJ was a three-star rank admiral in the Pakistan Navy. Prior to his death in 1985, he was serving as the managing director of Karachi Shipyard and Engineering from 1983 until 1985.

== Biography ==
Zamir's younger brother, Khurshid Ahmad is a well known economist and a political figure in the country. Despite his family's strict religious adherence, Zamir, in the Navy, was nonetheless described as moderate person.

He attended a technical college in Delhi. His family emigrated to Pakistan after the partition of India on 14 August 1947. He transferred to Forman Christian College in Lahore, then attended NED University of Engineering and Technology in Karachi. However, he left his studies without completing the B.E. program. He was selected for the Pakistan Navy.

He was sent to the United Kingdom as a cadet in 1950. Four year later he returned and became a lieutenant in the Navy. His career in the Navy progressed well, and participated in the second war with India in 1965 as lieutenant-commander, and was later trained at the Pakistan Military Academy in 1966–68. In 1969, Cdr Zamir was posted in East-Pakistan where he was instrumental in setting up the Pakistan Marines's battalions with the elements of the Baloch Regiment. In 1970, Captain Zamir was made commanding officer of the Pakistan Marines.

After the Pakistan Eastern Command surrendered at the end of the Indo-Pakistani war of 1971, he spent three years as a prisoner of war. In 1974, Captain Zamir was repatriated to Pakistan from Zero Point under the agreement signed with India. He continued his military service with the Navy, and was appointed as director-general of Naval Intelligence with the rank of commodore in 1975–77. In 1977, Cdre Zamir was appointed as DCNS of Operations (DCNS(Ops)), and later elevated as chief of staff under naval chief, Admiral Karamat Rahman Niazi, in 1979.

As of 1979, Rear-admiral Zamir was Commander Pakistan Fleet (COMPAK). Vice-admiral Ahmad served as the secretary of defence production from April 1981 until August 1982. By October 1984, he was the managing director of Karachi Shipyard and Engineering Works.

According to his brother, Khurshid Ahmad, Zamir was in the running for Chief of the Pakistan Navy when he died in 1985.

== See also ==
- Pakistani prisoners of war in India
- Pakistan Navy in East Pakistan
  - Pakistan Marines East
