= Operation Dwarka =

Naval Operation In Indo-Pakistani War Of 1965

- Part of the naval conflict of the India–Pakistan war of 1965
Date	7–8 September 1965
Location	Dwarka, Jamnagar district, Gujarat, India 22.23°N 68.97°E
Result	Inconclusive

Belligerents
Pakistan	India

Commanders and leaders
Commodore S. M. Anwar	Rear Admiral B. A. Samson

Units involved
Pakistan Navy: 25th Destroyer Squadron	Indian Navy

Strength
1 light cruiser (PNS Babur); 6 destroyers (PNS Khaibar, PNS Badr, PNS Jahangir, PNS Shah Jahan, PNS Alamgir, PNS Tippu Sultan); 1 submarine (PNS Ghazi)	Unknown
- Location within India

Operation Dwarka was a naval operation by the Pakistan Navy to attack the Indian coastal town of Dwarka on 7 and 8 September 1965. This instance was the first engagement by the Pakistan Navy in any of the India–Pakistan wars. (Note: The navy was formed in 1947 with the nation's independence from Great Britain, and fighting in the First India–Pakistan War was restricted to land and aerial combat missions.)

As the India–Pakistan war of 1965 broke out between India and Pakistan over Kashmir, the armies and air forces of both nations were involved in intense fighting in the regions of Punjab and Kashmir. To relieve pressure on the southern front, Pakistan decided to send its navy to launch a strike on the Indian coast. The primary objective of the attack ostensibly was to destroy the radar station at Dwarka which was believed by Pakistani naval intelligence to have a Huff-Duff beacon to guide Indian bombers. Pakistani high command also hoped to divert the operations of the Indian Air Force away from the north.

Many Pakistani sources describe the operation as at least partially successful, while many Indian ones dispute this.

== Operation ==
On the night of 7 September, the Pakistan Navy launched its assault on Western Indian shores. Dwarka was chosen for its proximity 200 km (120 mi) from the Karachi Port, its relatively weak defences and historical political prominence. The plan called for a fleet of seven naval vessels to shell the town of Dwarka. The attack was aimed at luring the heavy ships anchored in Mumbai into attacking the Pakistani ships to enable the submarine PNS Ghazi lurking in the Arabian Sea to engage and sink the Indian ships. Accordingly, a fleet of seven ships comprising PNS Babur, PNS Khaibar, PNS Badr, PNS Jahangir, PNS Alamgir, PNS Shah Jahan and PNS Tippu Sultan set sail for Dwarka and bombarded the town. The bombardment continued past midnight.

The Indian warships harbored in Mumbai were under refit and were unable to sortie, nor did Ghazi encounter active combatants on the West coast. According to Pakistani sources, the objective of diverting the Indian Air Force from attacking Pakistan's southern front worked as air raids on the city of Karachi ceased. This was presumed to be due also to the lack of availability of the radar guidance, which Pakistan claimed was damaged in the attack.

The Indian Navy's official version of events is that, around 23:55 hours, the Pakistani vessels fired on Dwarka for more than 20 minutes. The ships fired around 50 shells each, which included 5.25 inch rounds fired by the Pakistani cruiser PNS Babur. The report adds that most shells fell between the temple and the railway station, which lay 3 km (1.9 mi) from the lighthouse. Some buildings were hit, with the Railway Guest House suffering significant damage along with a cement factory. Smoke from the damage was visible to the Pakistani warships, approximately 20 km (12 mi) away.

The radar installation was shelled during the bombardment but neither was the radar damaged nor were there any casualties according to Indian sources. The frigate INS Talwar was in nearby Okha Port undergoing repairs and did not intervene. Hiranandani's history of the Indian Navy states that:

Next morning she (INS Talwar) was directed to send a team to Dwarka to assess the damage. The team found that most of the shells had fallen on the soft soil between the temple and the radio station and failed to explode. The air attack damaged a railway engine and destroyed a portion of a railway guesthouse.

A total of 40 unexploded shells were also recovered intact. The shells bore the mark "INDIAN ORDNANCE"; these were dated from the 1940s before the Partition of India into India and Pakistan.

Radio Pakistan, however, transmitted that Dwarka was badly damaged.

=== Naval command ===
The following is the list of commanding officers of the operation:

- Commodore S.M. Anwar, OTC – Officer Commanding of Operation Dwarka and the Commander of the Pakistan Fleet (COMPAK)
- Captain MAK Lodhi – Commanding Officer of PNS Babur, the light cruiser.
- Captain A Hanif – Commanding Officer of PNS Khaibar, the destroyer.
- Commander IH Malik – Commanding Officer of PNS Badr, the frigate.
- Commander KM Hussain – Commanding Officer of PNS Jahangir, the destroyer.
- Commander Iqbal F. Quadir – Commanding Officer of PNS Alamgir, the destroyer.
- Commander SZ Shamsie – Commanding Officer of PNS Shah Jahan, the destroyer.
- Commander Amir Aslam – Commanding Officer of PNS Tippu Sultan, the destroyer.
- Commander Karamat Rahman Niazi – Commanding Officer of PNS Ghazi, the submarine.
- Commander Muhammad Ismail – Commander Signals, PNS Tippu Sultan, the destroyer.

== Aftermath ==
For some, Operation Dwarka was a significant naval operation of the 1965 war, but others considered it a nuisance raid or of little strategic value. The Indian Ministry of Defence had issued written instructions which ordered the Indian Navy "not to proceed two hundred miles beyond Mumbai nor North of the parallel of Porbandar". The lack of response by the Indian Navy to the attack on Dwarka led to questions being asked in the Parliament of India and a challenge to be answered by others. The Chief of the Naval Staff, Vice Admiral B.S. Soman was restrained from retaliation for the Dwarka raid by the Defence Minister. Of the Indian Navy's 23 ships, ten were under refit in Mumbai, including the INS Vikrant, the light cruiser INS Delhi, three destroyers and two frigates. The failure of INS Talwar to retaliate, then undergoing repairs to her condensers in Okha, has been lamented by Indian Vice Admiral N. Krishnan who said that no government would blame a warship going into action, if attacked. Following the action, the Indian Navy deployed Bregut Alizes for ELINT and Maritime patrol in the area. PNS Ghazi continued to patrol Kachchh and Mumbai coasts spotting aircraft positions when snorkeling.

An Indian source explained this by saying that the Indian government did not want to get into a naval conflict with Pakistan, but wished to restrict the war to a land-based conflict.The Dwarka raid is considered by Pakistani sources as being a prime reason for the Indian Navy's subsequent post-war modernization and expansion, with an increase in budget from ₹35 crore (equivalent to ₹25 billion or US$260 million in 2026) to ₹115 crore (equivalent to ₹62 billion or US$640 million in 2026). The Dwarka raid, as per an Indian historian G. M Hiranandani, led to the procurement of missile boats by the Indian Navy from the Soviet Union for the Defense of Kutch. These were subsequently used by India in Operation Trident and Operation Python in the 1971 war. However, he attributes the expansion of the Indian Navy in the period 1965 to 1975 to the post-1962 planned expansion of the Indian Navy with many ships being negotiated and purchased from the Soviet Union prior to the war.

== Popular culture ==
In 1998, Inter Services Public Relations (ISPR) financed and produced the historical dramatization film of the operation named, Operation Dwarka, 1965, which was based on this incident. The film was directed by Pakistani film director Qasim Jalali and it was written by Hameed Kashmiri.

== See also ==
- India-Pakistani war of 1965
- India–Pakistan naval war of 1971
- PNS Ghazi
- PNS Hangor

== Bibliography ==
- Hiranandani, G. M. (January 2000). Transition to triumph: history of the Indian Navy, 1965–1975. Lancer Publishers. ISBN 978-1-897829-72-1.
