= Mohammad Shariff =

Pakistani admiral (1920–2020)

Mohammad Shariff NI(M) HJ HI(M) LoM
- محمد شريف
- Admiral Shariff (left) meeting his US counterpart Admiral William J. Crowe.

2nd Chairman Joint Chiefs of Staff Committee
- In office 23 January 1977 – 13 April 1980
- Preceded by: General Muhammad Shariff
- Succeeded by: General Iqbal Khan

Chief of Naval Staff
- In office 23 March 1975 – 21 March 1979
- Preceded by: Vice-Admiral Hasan Hafeez Ahmed
- Succeeded by: Admiral Karamat Rahman Niazi

Chairman of Federal Public Service Commission
- In office 1980–1986

Personal details
- Born: 1 July 1920 Bhurchh in Kharian Tehsil, District Gujrat, Punjab, British India (now West Punjab, Pakistan)
- Died: 27 April 2020 (aged 99) Islamabad, Pakistan
- Resting place: Islamabad, Pakistan
- Citizenship: British Subject (1920–1947); Pakistan (1947–2020)

Military service
- Allegiance: (British Raj) British India; Pakistan
- Branch/service: Royal Indian Navy (1936–1947); Pakistan Navy (1947–1980)
- Years of service: 1936–1980
- Rank: Admiral
- Unit: Executive Branch
- Commands: Vice Chief of Naval Staff; DCNS (Operations); DCNS (Personnel); Eastern Naval Command, East Pakistan
- Battles/wars: World War II; Battle of the Atlantic; Battle of Mediterranean; Royal Indian Navy mutiny; Indo-Pakistani War of 1965; Operation Dwarka; Bangladesh Liberation War; Operation Searchlight; Operation Barisal; Indo-Pakistani War of 1971 (Eastern Front); Operation Fair Play; Soviet–Afghan War
- Awards: Nishan-e-Imtiaz (Military); Hilal-e-Jurat; Hilal-e-Imtiaz (Military); Legion of Merit
- Service number: S/No. PN. 138

Mohammad Shariff NI(M) HJ HI(M) LoM (Urdu: محمد شريف ; 1 July 1920 – 27 April 2020), was a Pakistani senior admiral who served as the 2nd Chairman of Joint Chiefs of Staff Committee and a memoirist who was at the center of all the major decisions made in Pakistan in the events involving the war with India in 1971, the enforcement of martial law in the country in 1977, and the decision in covertly intervening against Soviet Union in Afghanistan.

Gaining commission in the Royal Indian Navy, he participated in World War II on behalf of Great Britain before joining the Pakistan Navy in 1947 as one of the senior staff officers. In 1969, he was appointed the Flag Officer Commanding of the Eastern Naval Command in East Pakistan during the civil war there, followed by the foreign intervention by India in 1971. After the war, he was taken as a war prisoner along with Lieutenant-General A.A.K Niazi, the commander of Pakistan Army's Eastern Command after conceding the surrender of the Pakistan Armed Forces personnel to the Indian Army.

He resumed his active military service in the Navy after his repatriation from India and was appointed the Chief of Naval Staff in 1975 after the sudden death of Vice-Admiral Hasan Ahmed. He had the distinction of being the first four-star admiral in the navy and was the first admiral to be appointed as Chairman joint chiefs committee in 1978 until 1980. As the Chairman Joint Chiefs Committee, he continued to advocate for an aggressive foreign policy and a strong nuclear deterrent against foreign intervention.

After retiring from the military in 1980, Shariff was appointed as chairman of Federal Public Service Commission while he continued his role as military adviser to President Zia-ul-Haq until 1988 when he retired from public service. After living a quiet life in Islamabad, he announced the publishing of his memoirs, Admiral's Diary, providing further accounts, causes, and failure of the military crackdown in East Pakistan.

== Biography ==
=== World War II and RIN career ===
Mohammad Shariff was born in Gujrat, Punjab, British India in 1920. As many of his contemporaries, he was educated at the Rashtriya Indian Military College and joined the Royal Indian Navy (RIN) in 1936 as a sailor in the Communications Branch. One of his close colleagues at this time was Gautum Singh, whom he would fight against in 1971.

He participated in the World War II as a signalist in the Royal Indian Navy on behalf of Great Britain and took part in military action in the Atlantic, Mediterranean, Red sea, and Bay of Bengal. In 1945, he went to the United Kingdom to attend the Britannia Royal Naval College in Dartmouth, England where he graduated with a staff course degree.

=== War and staff appointments in Pakistan Navy ===
In 1947, the United Kingdom announced the partition of India. After the creation of Pakistan on 14 August 1947, Lieutenant Shariff decided to opt for Pakistan and joined the newly established Pakistan Navy.

He was the 20th most senior lieutenant in the navy in terms of seniority list provided by the Royal Indian Navy to the Ministry of Defense (MoD) in 1947. In the 1950s, he served on various assignments in the Pakistan military and served as a senior staff officer at the Navy NHQ from 1953 to 1956 as Lieutenant-Commander. In 1960, he was promoted as Commander in the Navy and went to the United States where he attended the Naval War College in Newport, Rhode Island, and graduated with a master's degree in War studies in 1962.

Upon returning to Pakistan in 1962, he was appointed as Deputy Chief of Naval Staff (Personnel) with a promoting rank of Captain at the NHQ.

In 1965, Captain Shariff continued his staff appointment role as DCNS (Personnel) at the NHQ and participated in the second war with India in 1965. He participated in planning of the naval assault against the Indian Navy and provided his analysis based on personnel preparation for the operation.

In 1966, he was promoted as Commodore and posted as DCNS (Operations) by the Commander in Chief Admiral S. M. Ahsan where he continued his role until 1969. In 1968, Commodore Shariff paid a goodwill visit to China alongside and held defence talks with the senior leadership of People's Liberation Army.

=== Pakistan Eastern Naval Command ===
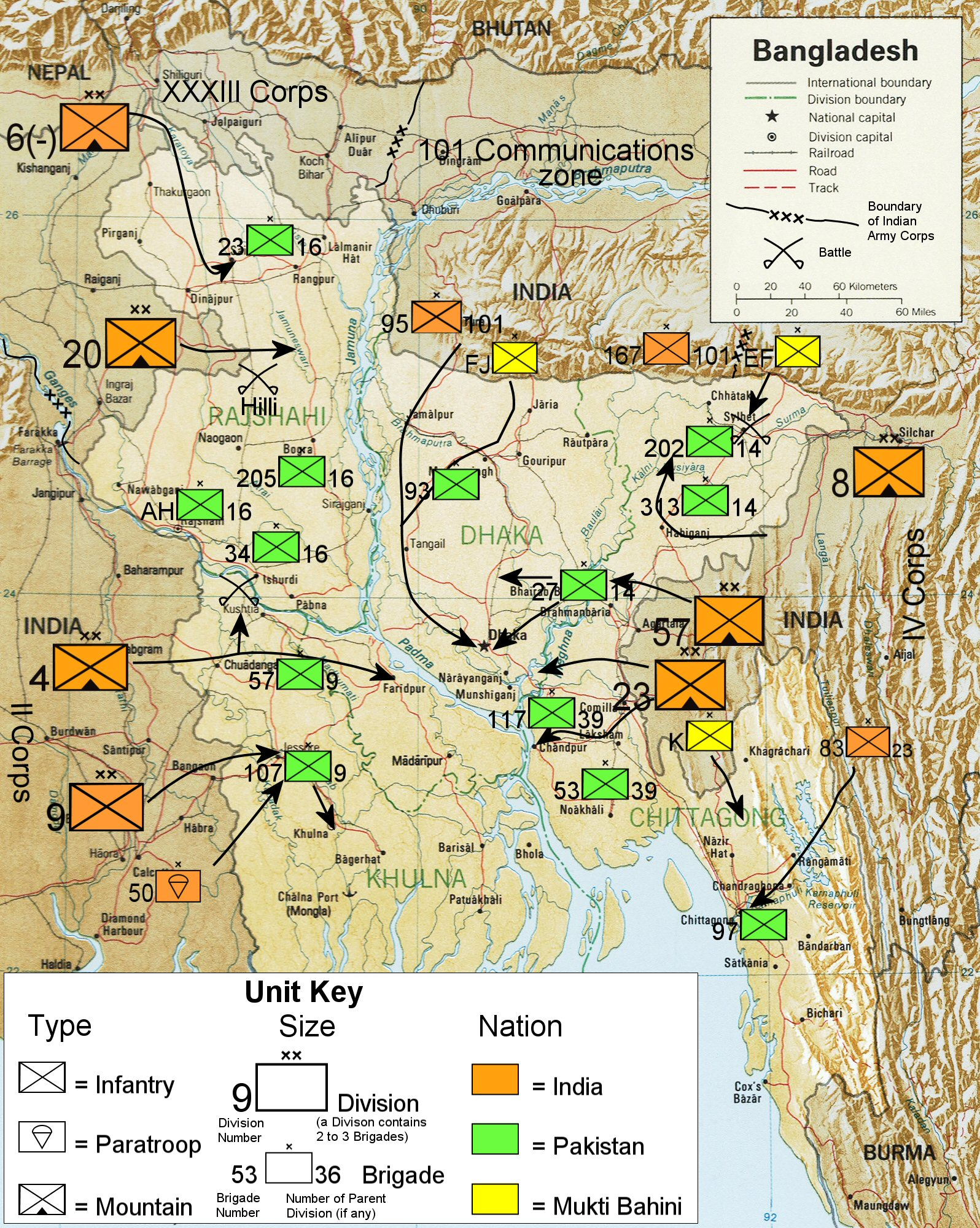
Military map of East Pakistan, with Indian Army encircling the India-East Pakistan border.

In 1969, Commodore Shariff was promoted as Rear-Admiral, a two-star rank, and posted in East Pakistan as Flag Officer Commanding (FOC) at the Eastern Naval Command HQ. His naval command was coordinated with the army's Eastern Command.

During the same time, President General Yahya Khan appointed Admiral S. M. Ahsan as the Governor of East Pakistan and Lt. Gen. Yaqub Khan as the commander of the army's Eastern Command, and the activities, momentum, and magnitude of the Pakistan Navy in East Pakistan increased at a maximum level, and more military and naval exercises began to take place in East Pakistan that initially focused on gathering intelligence on Indian infiltration in East. East Pakistan, under the martial law administration of Admiral Ahsan, saw the period of stability and the civil control and law and order situation was effectively under control. In 2010, Admiral Shariff authored his memories and concluded:

The initial military success (Searchlight and Barisal) in regaining the law and order situation in East-Pakistan in March 1971 was misunderstood as a complete success.... In actuality, the law and order situation deteriorated with time, particularly after September of the same year when the population turned increasingly against the [Pakistan] armed forces as well as the [Yahya's military] government. The rapid increase in the number of troops though bloated the overall strength, however, [it] did not add to our fighting strength to the extent that was required. A sizeable proportion of the new additions were too old, inexperienced or unwilling....

— Admiral Mohammad Shariff, Commander of Eastern Naval Command,

In 1970, the Election Commission held the general elections in the country that resulted in Awami League securing the supermajority in the East while Pakistan Peoples Party claiming the mandate in Pakistan. When the agitations in East Pakistan began to gain momentum, President Yahya held meeting with Governor Vice-Admiral Ahsan and army's Eastern Command's commander Lieutenant-General Yaqub Khan over their mission outcomes where both objected the brute force against the Bengali rebels. Despite opposition, President Yahya Khan authorized the Operation Searchlight and accepted the resignations from Governor Admiral Ahsan and General Yaqub, only to be appointed Lieutenant-General Tikka Khan as their capacity.

The Searchlight resulted in quick success, but it had created a temporary momentum on Bengali rebels who started their insurgency from Barisal, a riverine city which the Army had failed to infiltrated. Therefore, Rear-Admiral Shariff's command was put in test when he authorized the launch of Barisal which resulted in immediate success, but it had no long-lasting effects.

As the war progressed, he insisted on deployment of the combat warships to mount a serious pressure on the Indian Navy's Eastern Naval Command but naval HQ did not grant his wishes in fear of losing the warships into the hands of the enemy. He personally led many operations undertaken after the deployment of the Marines and SSG(N) against the Eastern Command of the Indian Army despite logistical disadvantages. Overall, the Pakistan Navy performed its mission task well and diligently by providing support to the army until the end. However, while the Navy was successful by performing its task, Pakistan Army's Eastern Military Commands were unsuccessful to achieve their objectives. In the East, he earned his reputation as an effective commander within the military circles whose efforts had partially made the strategic shores of East Pakistan safe from the Indian Navy.

==== Liberation war and surrender ====
The Indian Air Force's aerial campaign resulted in taking Sq. Ldr PQ Mehdi as war prisoner and dismantling the only No. 14 Squadron active in the East. Admiral Shariff authorized Lieutenant-Colonel Liaquat Asrar Bukhari to evacuate the Aviation Corps and take refuge to neighbouring Burma. When Air Commodore Inamul Haq, commander of Eastern Air Command, argued against the evacuation, Shariff strongly lobbied for the evacuation by convincing Lieutenant-General Niazi that Colonel Liaqat Bukhari should be allowed to give it a try, as several helicopters would be prevented from falling into enemy hands. General Niazi agreed with Rear-Admiral Shariff and ordered Colonel Liaqat to launch an evacuation operation immediately. Over several nights, the army aviators, large number of PAF pilots and personnel successfully left for Akyab in Burma.

About the deployment of US Taskforce 74 in support to the Pakistani military, Admiral Shariff had notified General Niazi that "if the American Fleet had been coming to help them [Eastern Command], it would have established contacts with his HQ."

During the entire military conflict, insurgency was widely spread to entire provincial state, East Pakistan. The Indian Military had intervened in East-Pakistan, the Eastern Air Command and Eastern Military Command forced Lieutenant-General A. A. K. Niazi to surrender the Pakistan Eastern Command Forces to his counterpart Jagjit Singh Arora. In spite of Eastern Naval Command paying a heavy price, Admiral Shariff continued to keep the morale of Pakistan Navy personnel on high who were later pushed back to the wall by Mukti Bahni and the animosity of public that pounded the Pakistan Naval assets.

As Indian Armed Forces entered in East-Pakistan, Shariff planned an immediate evacuation operation. He commanded and oversaw the maximum evacuation of Pakistan Naval assets from East Pakistan to Burma in a limited time. However, the night Pakistan Eastern Military High Command were surrendered, Shariff with a small number of military officers planned to leave as the Pakistan naval vessel was waiting for their evacuation. As the East-Pakistan fell, all the naval routes were closed by Indian Navy, forcing Shariff to remain in East-Pakistan.

On 16 December, Rear-Admiral Mohammad Shariff surrendered his TT pistol to Vice-Admiral Nilakanta Krishnan, the Flag Officer Commanding-in-Chief Eastern Naval Command at 4:31pm (16:31hrs). His TT Pistol is still placed in "covered glass" display at the Indian Military Academy's Museum.

Later, he joined General Niazi where he was presented at the time when the Instrument of Surrender was signed. Shariff was the only Admiral at that particular event, with thirty brigadiers, and four Major-Generals, and thousands of soldiers and personnel witnessed the event and instrument that Niazi signed.

=== War prisoner and return ===
Upon surrendering of the Eastern Command, Rear-Admiral Shariff was taken as prisoner of war (POW) and was taken adjacent Camp No. 77A, where many of the senior military officials were held, including Lieutenant-General Niazi, in 1971. In 1972, he was later shifted to Fort William in Calcutta where the U.S. Navy naval chief Admiral Elmo Zumwalt paid him a visit, followed by a visit of Indian naval chief Admiral S. M. Nanda.

Later, Admiral Nanda transferred him to Jabalpur, to Rear-Admiral Gautum Singh who had done communications operations and specialization under Admiral Shariff in HMS Mercury during World War II. He also requested a copy of the Quran which he recited during his time of his imprisonment.

[At the end of the conflict] ... We [Eastern Naval Command] had no intelligence and hence, were both deaf and blind with the Indian Navy and Indian Air Force pounding us day and night ...

— Admiral Mohammad Shariff telling Admiral Zumwalt in 1971,

In March 1973, the Indian government handed over Rear-Admiral Shariff to Pakistan government at the Wagha border. He was allowed to resume his military service and testified in the War Enquiry Commission, where he noted that: "the foundation for the defeat in East Pakistan could be traced back to the military coup d'état in 1958 where senior officers became greedy self-serving politicians rather than soldiers." In 1974, he was promoted as Vice-Admiral and appointed as Vice-Chief of Naval Staff under Vice-Admiral H.H. Ahmed despite the latter being junior to Vice-Admiral Shariff.

== Chief of Naval Staff ==
On 23 March 1975, Vice-Admiral Shariff's appointment as Chief of Naval Staff was approved by Prime Minister Zulfikar Ali Bhutto after Vice-Admiral H. H. Ahmed died of heart complications on 8 March 1975. At the time of his appointment, he was the most senior admiral and superseded no one. In 1976, Vice-Admiral Shariff was promoted to four-star rank admiral by President Fazal Ilahi Chaudhry— the first four-star appointment in the history of the Navy since its establishment in 1947.

== Chairman Joint Chiefs of Staff ==
On 22 January 1977, he was appointed acting Chairman Joint Chiefs of Staff Committee in the absence of General Muhammad Shariff and led the delegation to meet with Vice Chairman Li Xiannian when he paid a state visit to Pakistan.

Admiral Shariff was named deputy CMLA in the Military Council that is viewed to assist President Fazal Ilahi.

In 1977, he was appointed acting Chairman Joint Chiefs of Staff Committee in the absence of General Muhammad Shariff who later resigned amid disagreement of the decision of the martial law on 22 January 1977. In 1978, his appointment to the chairman joint chiefs was officially confirmed by President Ilahi after the involuntary resignation of General Muhammad Sharif. He was the second chairman joint chiefs and the first admiral to have been appointed chairman joint chiefs.

=== Soviet–Afghan War ===
On 25 December 1979, the Soviet Union officially intervened in Afghanistan and President Zia called for a national security meeting that was attended by the Chairman joint chiefs, chiefs of staff of army, navy, and air force. At this meeting, he made no intentions against Soviet involvement in East Pakistan's crises after witnessing the Soviet support to India and Mukti Bahini. After this meeting, Zia authorized this operation under General Akhtar, and it was later merged with Operation Cyclone, a programme funded by the United States and the CIA.

At this meeting, President Zia had asked Admiral Shariff and his army chief of staff General Khalid Mahmud Arif to lead a geo-strategic civil-military team to formulate a geostrategy to counter Soviet aggression. He played a crucial role in President Zia's policy on nuclear weapons and was a strong proponent for the implementation of the nuclear deterrent with a view to prevention of foreign intervention.

== Later life and post-retirement ==
In 1980, Admiral Shariff's retirement was due and decided not to seek an extension as he was succeeded by General Iqbal Khan. He was given a guard of honour, and a monument under his name was built in Navy NHQ and the Joint Staff HQ.

Upon retirement, he was appointed as Chairman of the Federal Public Service Commission and continued his role as military adviser to President Zia-ul-Haq. However, he was given criticism for leading the appointment of those civil bureaucrats who were loyal to his government and his chairmanship, while those who were not were subsequently moved. He continued his role as military adviser and the chairmanship until the death of President Zia-ul-Haq in 1988 and took retirement from public service and his role as the military adviser to the Government of Pakistan.

Admiral Shariff was a recipient of Hilal-i-Jurat, which was awarded to him after the 1971 war and the Nishan-e-Imtiaz by Bhutto after coming back from India.

After his retirement, he lived a quiet life in Islamabad surrounded and supported by close friends and family, and served as President of Elaf Club of Pakistan, a political and military think tank based in Islamabad. On 23 September 2010, Admiral Shariff wrote and launched his first autobiography Admiral's Diary, in English.

Shariff died on 27 April 2020.

== Awards and decorations ==

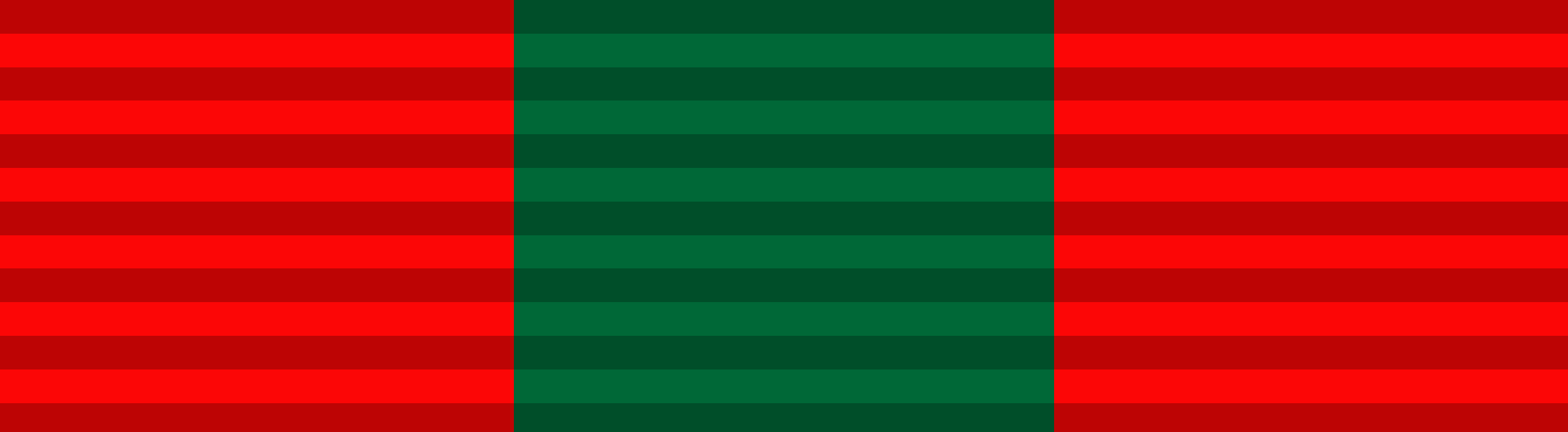

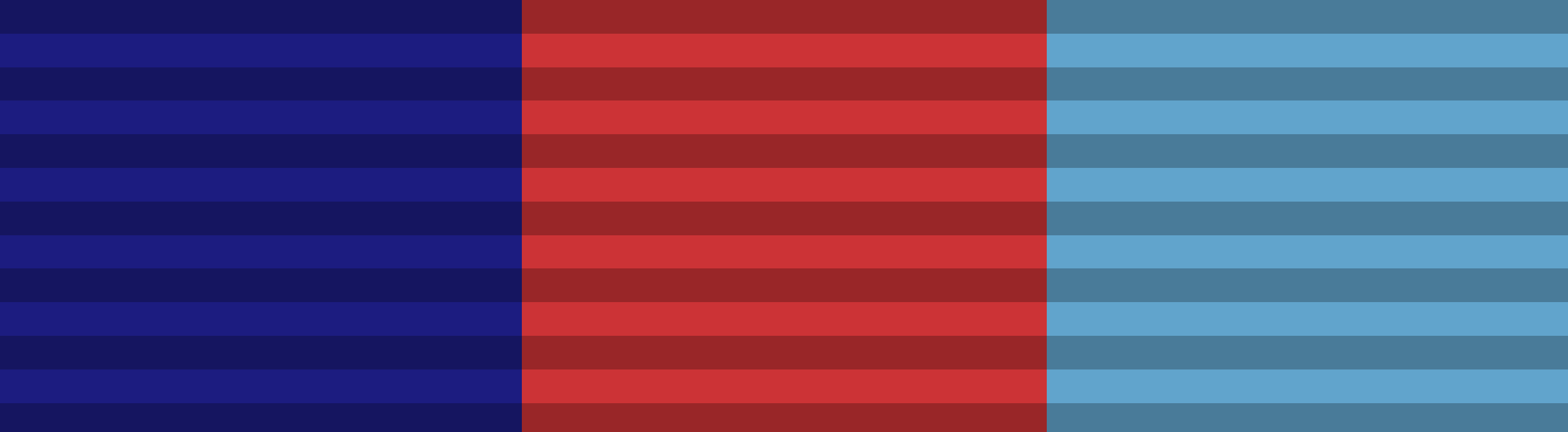

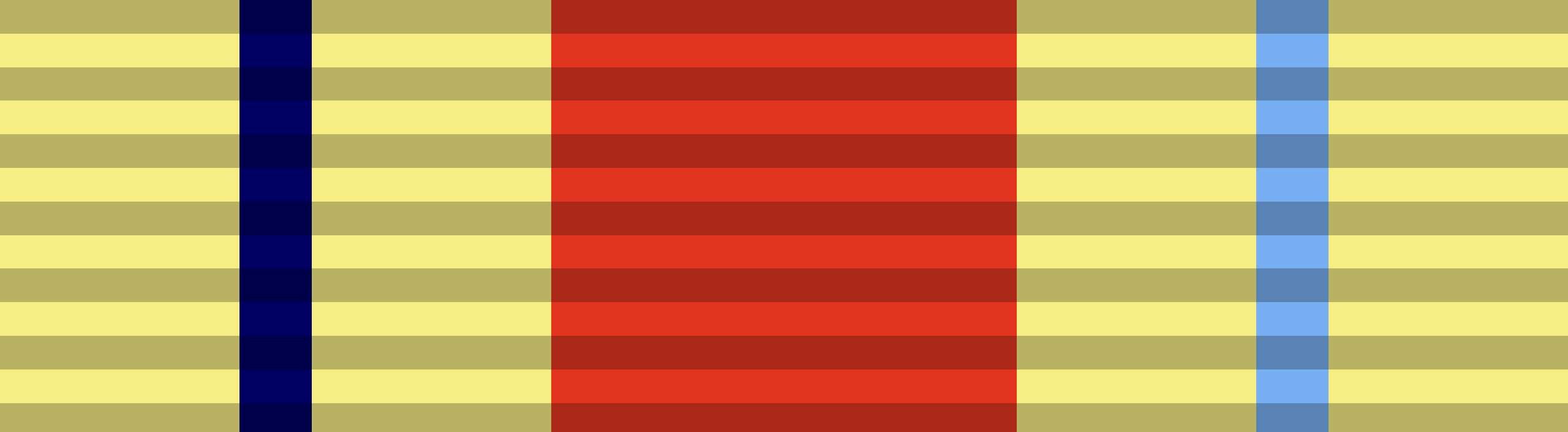

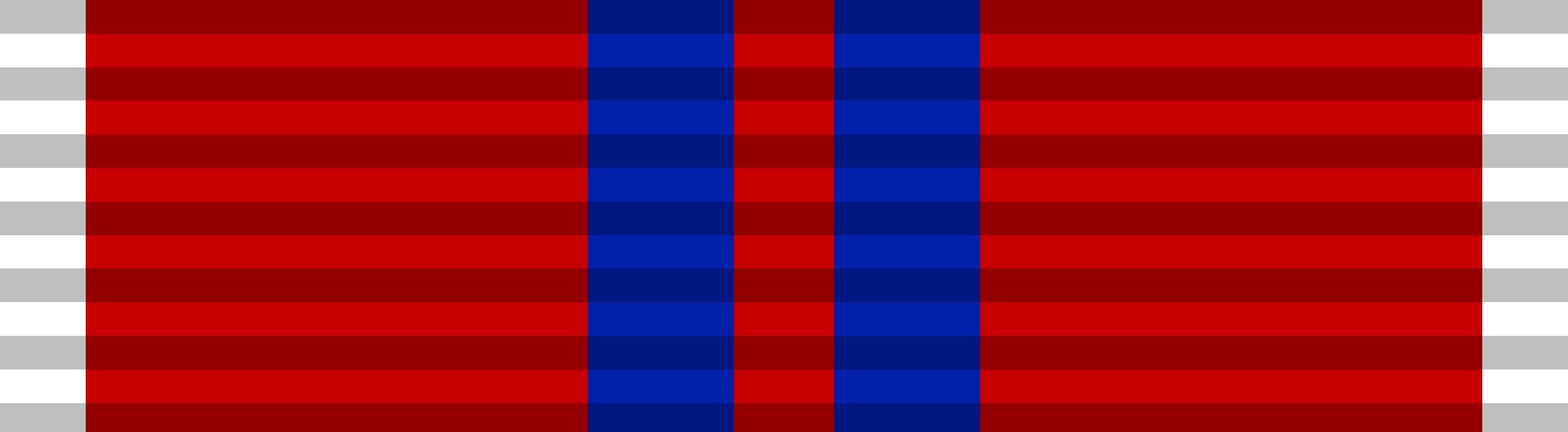

| Nishan-e-Imtiaz (Military) (Order of Excellence) | Hilal-e-Jurat (Crescent of Courage) 1971 War | Hilal-e-Imtiaz (Military) (Crescent of Excellence) | Tamgha-e-Diffa (General Service Medal): 1. 1965 War Clasp; 2. 1971 War Clasp |
| Sitara-e-Harb 1965 War (War Star 1965) | Sitara-e-Harb 1971 War (War Star 1971) | Tamgha-e-Jang 1965 War (War Medal 1965) | Tamgha-e-Jang 1971 War (War Medal 1971) |
| Pakistan Tamgha (Pakistan Medal) 1947 | Tamgha-e-Sad Saala Jashan-e- Wiladat-e-Quaid-e-Azam (100th Birth Anniversary of Muhammad Ali Jinnah) 1976 | Tamgha-e-Jamhuria (Republic Commemoration Medal) 1956 | Hijri Tamgha (Hijri Medal) 1979 |
| 1939-1945 Star | Atlantic Star | Africa Star | Burma Star |
| War Medal 1939–1945 | India Service Medal 1939–1945 | Queen Elizabeth II Coronation Medal (1953) | The Legion of Merit (Degree of Commander) (US) |

=== Foreign Decorations ===
Foreign Awards
| UK | 1939-1945 Star |
| UK | Atlantic Star |
| UK | Africa Star |
| UK | Burma Star |
| UK | War Medal 1939-1945 |
| UK | India Service Medal 1939–1945 |
| UK | Queen Elizabeth II Coronation Medal |
| USA | The Legion of Merit (Degree of Commander) |

Military offices
| Preceded by Hasan Hafeez Ahmed | Chief of Naval Staff; 1975–1979 | Succeeded by Karamat Rahman Niazi |
| Preceded by Muhammad Shariff | Chairman of the Joint Chiefs of Staff Committee; 1978–1980 | Succeeded by Iqbal Khan |
