= Muzaffar Hassan =

Pakistan Navy admiral

Vice Admiral Muzaffar Hassan SK
- مظفر حسن

5th Commander-in-Chief Pakistan Navy
- In office 1 September 1969 – 22 December 1971
- President: General Yahya Khan; Zulfikar Ali Bhutto
- Preceded by: S. M. Ahsan
- Succeeded by: Hasan Hafeez Ahmed (as Chief of Naval Staff)

Personal details
- Born: 1921
- Died: 2012 (aged 90–91)
- Party: Tehreek-e-Istiqlal (1977-1980)
- Education: Joint Services Staff College (UK)
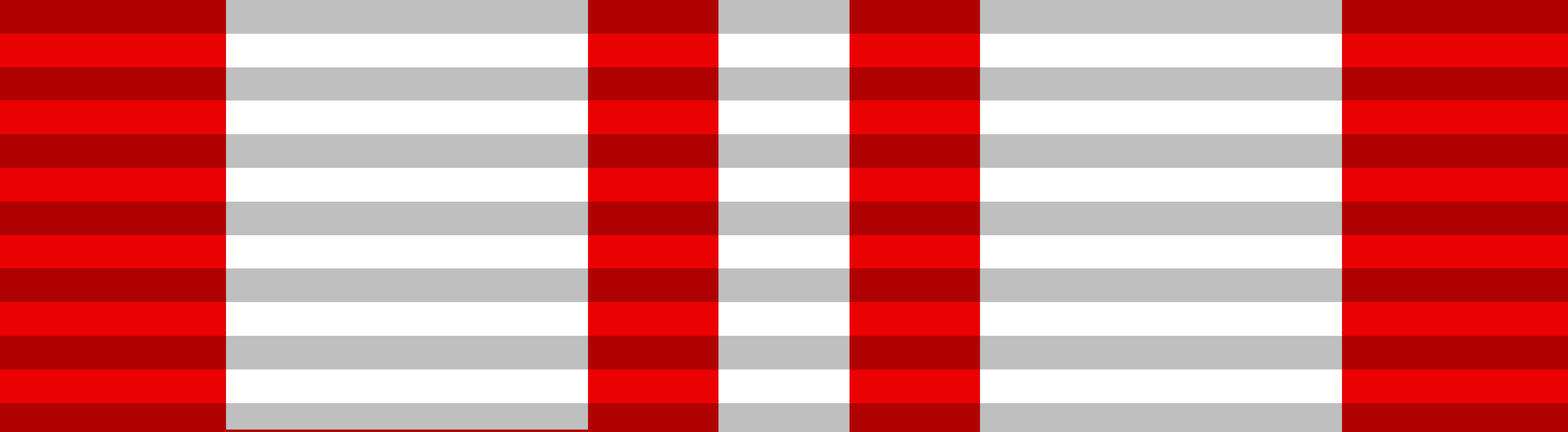
- Awards: Sitara-i-Khidmat

Military service
- Branch/service: Royal Indian Navy (1943–1947); Pakistan Navy (1947–1971)
- Years of service: 1943–1971
- Rank: Vice Admiral
- Unit: Navy Executive Branch S/No. PN. 073
- Commands: Pakistan Navy
- Battles/wars: World War II; European Front; Indo-Pakistani War of 1965; Indo-Pakistani War of 1971; 1971 Naval operations

Muzzafar Hassan (Note: Urdu: مظفر حسن) (1921 - June 2012) was a three-star rank naval officer who served as the fifth and last Commander-in-Chief of the Pakistan Navy from 1969 until 1971, serving under first President Yahya Khan and then a few days under President Zulfikar Ali Bhutto. He commanded the Navy in the Indo-Pakistani war of 1971.

== Early life ==
Muzaffar Hassan was born in Lucknow in 1921.

== Personal life ==
Muzaffar was married to Gohar Begum.

== Service years ==
=== Royal Indian Navy (1943-1947) ===
He was commissioned in the Royal Indian Navy in 1943 and participated in World War II.

=== Pakistan Navy (1947-1971) ===
He opted for the Royal Pakistan Navy (RPN) following the Partition of British India in August 1947. Hassan was among the first twenty naval officers to join the RPN as a lieutenant with the service number PN.0073 that was listed in the seniority list sent by the Royal Indian Navy to Pakistan's Ministry of Defence. He led the RPN hockey team during a match against the Indian Navy. The RPN won by a score of five to one against the Indian Navy.

In 1952, he was promoted to commander and commanded the destroyer PNS Tughril. He accompanied Governor of Punjab Abdur Rab Nishtar on Hajj to Mecca. His career in the Navy progressed in the 1960s; he was promoted to rear-admiral in 1965 after participating in the second war with India.

He succeeded Vice Admiral S. M. Ahsan as Commander-in-Chief of the Pakistan Navy on 1 September 1969. He frequently visited East Pakistan to review the operational readiness of the Navy between 1969 and 1971. During this time, he also served as military adviser to the Southeast Asia Treaty Organization (SEATO).

Naval casualties included 408 personnel killed at sea, and around 3,000 personnel, including 1300 naval officers, were held as prisoners of war. Many of his requests to retaliate against the Indian Navy were rebuffed by Air Marshal Abdul Rahim Khan, who reportedly said, "Well, old boy, this happens in war. I am sorry your ships have been sunk. We shall try to do something in the future."

After the war, he was relieved of command of the Navy on 22 December 1971 and replaced with Hasan Hafeez Ahmed.

== Later life and death ==
In 1977, Hassan became a politician and was the Chairman of Asghar Khan's political party, Tehreek-e-Istiqlal, in Karachi in October 1977. He announced his decision to retire from politics in a letter to Asghar Khan in May 1980.

Hassan was elected as the first president of the Defence Society Residents Association–a neighborhood watch– on 8 May 1981 and served until 1990.

He died in June 2012.

== In popular culture ==
He is portrayed by Karan Chibber in the 2026 Indian film Border 2, which is based on various engagements during the Indo-Pakistani War of 1971 including the sinking of INS Khukri by PNS Hangor.

== Notes ==
Military offices
Preceded by S. M. Ahsan	Commander-in-Chief, Pakistan Navy; 1969 – 1971	Succeeded by Hasan Hafeez Ahmed
