= H. H. Ahmed =

Pakistani Admiral (1926–1975)

H. H. Ahmed HQA SPk TQA
- ایچ ایچ احمد

1st Chief of Naval Staff
- In office 20 March 1972 – 8 March 1975
- President: Zulfikar Ali Bhutto; Fazal Ilahi Chaudhry
- Prime Minister: Nurul Amin; Zulfikar Ali Bhutto
- Preceded by: Muzaffar Hassan (as Commander-in-Chief)
- Succeeded by: Mohammad Shariff

Personal details
- Born: Hasan Hafeez Ahmed; 1926 Multan, Punjab, British India
- Died: 1975 (aged 48–49) Karachi, Sindh, Pakistan
- Education: Britannia Royal Naval College; Joint Services Staff College (UK)
- Awards: Hilal-e-Quaid-e-Azam; Sitara-e-Pakistan; Tamgha-e-Quaid-e-Azam (1965)

Military service
- Branch/service: Pakistan Navy
- Years of service: 1947–1975
- Rank: Vice Admiral
- Unit: Executive Branch
- Commands: Pakistan Navy; Commander Coast (COMCOAST); Commandant, Pakistan Naval Academy
- Battles/wars: Indo-Pakistani war of 1965; Indo-Pakistani war of 1971; India–Pakistan naval war of 1971

Hasan Hafeez Ahmed (Note: Urdu: حسن حفيظ احمد) (1926 — 10 March 1975), better known as H. H. Ahmed, was a Pakistan Navy officer who served as the first Chief of Naval Staff of the Pakistan Navy from March 1972 until his death in office in March 1975. He was appointed by President Zulfikar Ali Bhutto following the dismissal of the previous Commander-in-Chief, Vice-Admiral Muzaffar Hassan.

== Early life and education ==
Hasan Hafeez Ahmed was born in 1926 in Multan. He was educated locally and was a contemporary of Polly Shah, who later joined the Pakistan Air Force.

After completing school in 1943, Ahmed enlisted in the Royal Indian Navy as a petty officer and saw service in World War II. From 1945 to 1947, he attended the Britannia Royal Naval College in Dartmouth, England, graduating in 1947.

== Service years ==
Following the partition of British India in August 1947 and the establishment of Pakistan, he was commissioned as a sub-lieutenant in the Pakistan Navy and undertook further specialist training with the Royal Navy in the United Kingdom from 1947 to 1949.

In 1964, Ahmed attended the Joint Services Staff College (UK) at Latimer, graduating in 1965. On returning to Pakistan, he was posted to the Ministry of Defence as Director of Naval Operations and served in that capacity during the Indo-Pakistani war of 1965. He was awarded the Tamgha-e-Quaid-e-Azam in 1965. Following the war, he was posted as military attaché at the Pakistan Embassy in Washington, D.C., where he served until 1966.

In 1970, Ahmed was appointed the first Commandant of the Pakistan Naval Academy in the rank of commodore. The following year he was promoted to rear admiral and appointed Commander Coast (COMCOAST), a position he held during the 1971 war with India.

=== Chief of Naval Staff ===
Following Pakistan's defeat in the 1971 war, the War Enquiry Commission led to the dismissal on 3 March 1972 of the three service chiefs, including the Commander-in-Chief of the Navy, Vice-Admiral Muzaffar Hassan. On 20 March 1972, the title of Commander-in-Chief was redesignated as Chief of Naval Staff, and Ahmed was appointed to the post by President Zulfikar Ali Bhutto. The appointment passed over five more senior officers — three rear admirals and two commodores — who had been concurrently dismissed from the service.

As Chief of Naval Staff, Ahmed was tasked with rebuilding the Pakistan Navy following the loss of its eastern command and the destruction of significant assets in the 1971 conflict. He oversaw the establishment of the Pakistan Naval Air Arm in 1974, transforming the navy into a three-dimensional force, and supervised the relocation of the Naval Headquarters to Islamabad in 1973 to facilitate joint operations with the Army General Headquarters in Rawalpindi.

== Death ==
Ahmed died unexpectedly in office on 10 March 1975 at the age of 49 from a heart complication. He was a member of the committee which analyzed the Hamoodur Rahman Commission Report. Ahmed was the first of three Pakistani service chiefs to die in office, the others being General Asif Nawaz (Chief of Army Staff, 1993) and Air Chief Marshal Mushaf Ali Mir (Chief of Air Staff, 2003).

== Notes ==
Military offices
| Preceded by Muzaffar Hassan as Commander-in-Chief | Chief of Naval Staff; 1972–1975 | Succeeded by Mohammad Shariff |
