= Officer in tactical command =

In NATO, the officer in tactical command (OTC) is the naval officer exercising tactical command of a group of ships in a tactical formation such as a task unit, task group, or task force.

Ships travelling together on a specific mission might have one of the commanding officers designated OTC. On occasion, an officer senior to the ships' captains (a senior captain, a commodore, or an admiral) will be embarked specifically to take command of the formation and exercise the function of OTC.

== Purpose of the OTC ==
The purpose of the OTC is to provide authority and direction for actions the group is to take in the course of assigned operations and to communicate the information to higher authorities.

== Limitation of authority ==
In port, under peaceful circumstances where there is no tactical situation, the senior officer present afloat (SOPA) assumes certain roles associated with the OTC.

The OTC is only empowered to direct the assigned forces for the specific purposes designated by the officer exercising operational command over the formation. The OTC may not reassign forces for another purpose.
