= Karamat Rahman Niazi =

Pakistani admiral (died 2021)

Admiral Karamat Rahman Niazi Sitara-e-Jurat HI(M)

3rd Chief of Naval Staff
- In office 22 March 1979 – 23 March 1983
- Preceded by: Mohammad Shariff
- Succeeded by: Tariq Kamal Khan

Personal details
- Born: 30 April 1930 Hoshiarpur, Punjab Province (British India)
- Died: 5 April 2021 (aged 90)

Military service
- Branch/service: Pakistan Navy
- Years of service: 1948–1983
- Rank: Admiral
- Unit: Naval Operations Branch (S/No. PN. 214)
- Commands: Vice-Chief of Naval Staff; Commander Pakistan Fleet; Submarine Command
- Battles/wars: Indo-Pakistani War of 1965; Indo-Pakistani War of 1971

Karamat Rahman Niazi (Note: Urdu: كرامت رحمٰن نيازى) (usually shortened to K.R. Niazi) (30 April 1930 — 5 April 2021) was a senior officer of the Pakistan Navy who served as the eighth Chief of Naval Staff (CNS) from 1979 to 1983 of the Pakistan Navy.

He was renowned for being the Commanding officer of the submarine PNS Ghazi' during the Indo-Pakistani War of 1965, for which he was decorated. In 1979, he took over the command of the Pakistan Navy as its Chief of Naval Staff and worked in close coordination with President Zia-ul-Haq on the matters of national security throughout the 1980s.

== Biography ==
=== Naval career and between wars ===
Commander Niazi in PNS Ghazi

Karamat Rahman Niazi was born on 30 April 1930 in Hoshiarpur, Punjab, British India, to a Pathan noble family who belonged to the Niazi tribe. After graduating from a local high school, he commissioned in the Pakistan Navy as a midshipman in 1948 in Operations Branch and initially did his training at the Britannia Royal Naval College in Dartmouth in the United Kingdom. Upon returning, he was promoted to Sub lieutenant and his career in the Navy progressed extremely well, eventually being promoted to Lieutenant commander in 1962.

In 1963, Lieutenant-Commander Niazi was directed to the United States to complete a training on the submarine operations, and qualified for his training from the USS Angler, alongside then-Lieutenant Ahmad Tasnim. Upon commissioning of PNS Ghazi in the Navy in 1963, Niazi was promoted as commander and was the first commanding officer of the nation's first submarine, Ghazi.

On 2 September in 1965, Ghazi was deployed to Bombay coast under Niazi's command, initially covertly patrolling the Rann of Kutch coastal areas. However, his mission was to remain off the Bombay coast and engage only major warships of the Indian Navy which were close to the Karachi coast. After the naval shelling by the Pakistan Navy of Dwarka, India, Ghazi again returned to patrol off the Rann of Kutch area and identified two warships, but did not engage them.

On 17 September 1965, Commander Niazi ordered the firing of three Mk. 14 torpedoes at the INS Brahmaputra when it was identified by its navigator officers. He ordered an increase in depth to evade the counterattack, as there were three distant explosions heard. Niazi logged the explosions in the war logs, but Brahmaputra was not sunk nor had it released any depth charges, as no homing signals were detected by the submarine's computers. After a ceasefire was enforced by the two nations, Niazi decided to continue patrolling the Arabian Sea and safely reported back to its base on 23 September 1965.

At Navy NHQ, Niazi submitted his mission report, but did not submit an inquiry report of three mysterious explosions that were heard during the course of the mission. Niazi and Lieutenant-Commander Tasnim were publicly decorated with Sitara-e-Jurat by President Ayub Khan for their actions.

Niazi commanded Ghazi until 1967 before being promoted to captain and taking a staff assignment at Navy NHQ.

In 1971, he was promoted to commodore and temporarily held the rank of rear-admiral to assume the Submarine Command during the third war with India. In 1972, Commodore Niazi assumed the command of the Pakistan Fleet before being selected to attend the National Defence University in Islamabad to complete a master's degree in strategic studies, also in 1972.

Upon graduating in 1976, his promotion in the Navy was extremely quick due to the dismissal of senior flag ranking officers. He was immediately promoted to two-star rear-admiral, becoming the senior fleet commander as the head of the Pakistan Fleet. In 1977, he was promoted as vice-admiral and appointed Vice Chief of Naval Staff (VCNS), where he was instrumental in incorporating new ideas on anti-submarine warfare methods.

=== Chief of Naval Staff ===
Vice-Admiral Niazi was promoted as four-star rank admiral and assumed command of the Navy from Admiral Mohammad Shariff as its eighth Chief of Naval Staff on 22 March 1979. Admiral Niazi was honored with Nishan-i-Imtiaz (Military), which is awarded to all the services chiefs upon taking over their respective commands by the President.

As Chief of Naval Staff, he played a crucial role in stabilizing the Zia regime and was appointed martial law administrator under President General Zia-ul-Haq. Admiral Niazi worked in close coordination with Zia on the national security issues, including those involving internal security.

After the Soviet Union intervened in neighboring Afghanistan, Admiral Niazi gave authorization to the Navy's depot command in Karachi to store arms and weapons bought by the United States under a covert operation to secretly arm the Afghan mujahideen fighting the Soviet Union. His interests in the country's economy was also noted when aiding in preparation of federal budgets. During the same time, he maintained close ties with the People's Republic of China and held discussion on upgrading the existing naval infrastructure in the country. His tenure lasted only three years, and he retired on 22 March 1983, handing over command of the Navy to Admiral Tariq Kamal Khan.

== Post-retirement ==
After his retirement, Admiral K.R. Niazi lived a very quiet life and lived on military pension. He did not seek public office, but became a member of Tablighi Jamaat in his later life serving on missionary activities throughout his life.

On 23 January 2008, Admiral Niazi was among the retired senior military officers from the Ex-Servicemen Association who called for President Pervez Musharraf's resignation in order to pave the way for a complete restoration of democracy and law and order in the country. In 2009 and 2014, it was reported that Admiral Niazi had been secretly monitored by the FIA for his alleged and controversial activities in the country, though no charges were ever leveled against him.

== Awards and decorations ==
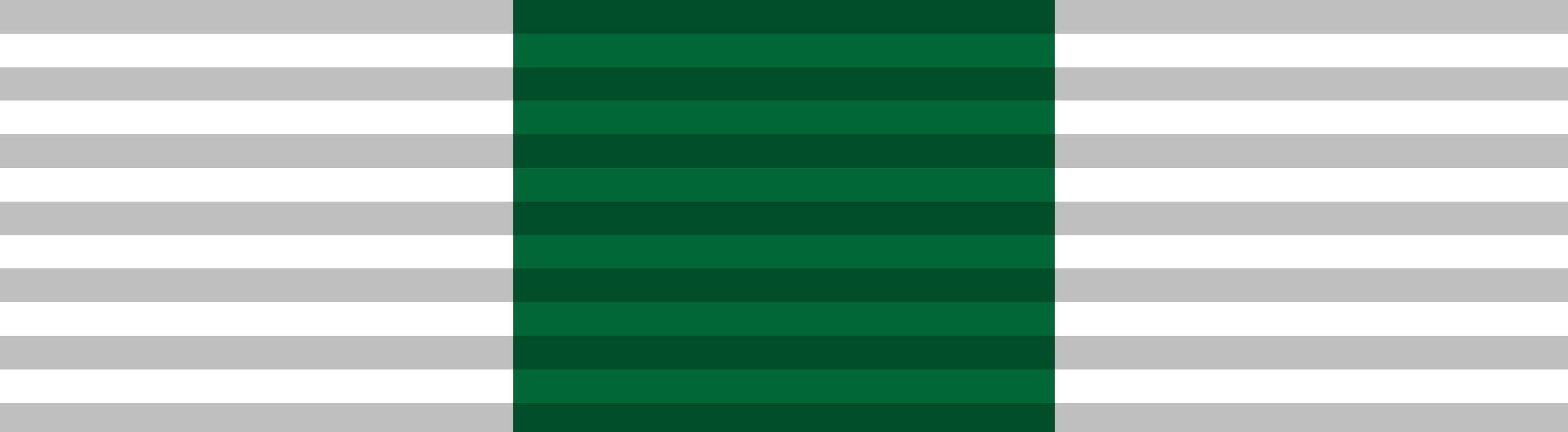

| Nishan-e-Imtiaz (Military) (Order of Excellence) | Hilal-i-Imtiaz (Military) (Crescent of Excellence) | | Sitara-e-Jurat (Star of Courage) 1965 War |
| Tamgha-e-Diffa (Defence Medal): 1. 1965 War Clasp; 2. 1971 War Clasp | Sitara-e-Harb 1965 War (War Star 1965) | Sitara-e-Harb 1971 War (War Star 1971) | Tamgha-e-Jang 1965 War (War Medal 1965) |
| Tamgha-e-Jang 1971 War (War Medal 1971) | Tamgha-e-Sad Saala Jashan-e-Wiladat-e-Quaid-e-Azam (100th Birth Anniversary of Muhammad Ali Jinnah) 1976 | Tamgha-e-Qayam-e-Jamhuria (Republic Commemoration Medal) 1956 | Hijri Tamgha (Hijri Medal) 1979 |

== Notes ==
Military offices
| Preceded by Mohammad Shariff | Chief of Naval Staff; 1979–1983 | Succeeded by Tariq Kamal Khan |
