= HMS Gabbard =

Battle-class destroyer

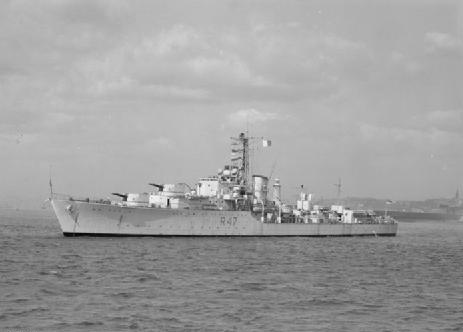

History

United Kingdom
- Name: HMS Gabbard
- Builder: Swan Hunter, Tyne and Wear, United Kingdom
- Laid down: 2 February 1944
- Launched: 16 March 1945
- Commissioned: 10 December 1946
- Decommissioned: 1953
- Identification: Pennant number D47
- Fate: Sold to Pakistan 1957

Pakistan
- Name: PNS Badr
- Acquired: 1957
- Identification: Pennant number D47
- Fate: Retired and decommissioned in 1985.

General characteristics
- Class & type: Battle-class destroyer
- Displacement: 2,480 tons standard; 3,430 tons full load
- Length: 379 ft (116 m)
- Beam: 40 ft 3 in (12.27 m)
- Draught: 15.3 ft (4.7 m) full load
- Propulsion: 2 × Admiralty 3-drum boilers; 2 × Parsons geared steam turbines; 2 shafts, 50,000 shp (37 MW)
- Speed: 35.75 knots (66.21 km/h)
- Range: 4,400 nautical miles (8,100 km) at 12 knots (22 km/h)
- Complement: 232 peace time; 268 war
- Armament: 2 × dual 4.5-inch (114 mm) gun; 1 × single 4.5 in gun QF Mark IV on mount CP Mk.V; 2 × twin 40 mm Bofor mounts "STAAG" Mk.II; 1 × twin 40 mm Bofors mounts "utility" Mk.V; 2 × single 40 mm Bofors mount Mk.VII; 10 × tubes for 21 inch (533 mm) Mk.IX torpedoes; 1 × Squid mortar

Service record
- Part of: 5th Destroyer Flotilla (UK)
- Operations: Indo-Pakistani War of 1965

HMS Gabbard was a Battle-class destroyer of the Royal Navy (RN). She was named in honour of the Battle of the Gabbard, which occurred in 1653, and which resulted in an English victory over the Dutch Fleet. Gabbard was built by Swan Hunter & Wigham Richardson Limited on the Tyne. She was laid down on 2 February 1944, launched on 16 March 1945 and completed on 10 December 1946.

== Royal Navy service ==
Upon commissioning, Gabbard joined the 5th Destroyer Flotilla, part of the Home Fleet based in the UK. In 1947, Gabbard, while on a visit to Malmö, Sweden, narrowly avoided collision with the ferry Malmohus out of Aarhus, Denmark. The harbour at Malmö is in the form of a capital 'E' the central segment being a stone jetty. The destroyer Solebay, entered the harbour first and tied up with the stone jetty on her port bow. She was followed by Gabbard. In order to depart, Gabbard swung round on her bow cable and started to steam ahead. At the same time the ferry entered the harbour. To avoid a collision, Gabbard went astern at speed. She then went ahead but was still going astern when she hit a ship on the stocks. The depth charge racks which protruded over the stern were forced up over the deck. She then was travelling forward and struck the end of the stone jetty on her starboard side. She suffered serious damage from the 'break' to the stern.

In 1948 Gabbard took part in the Autumn Cruise, which included the two aircraft carriers Theseus and Vengeance, and three other smaller vessels. The cruise deployed to South Africa and the West Indies, performing a number of fly-the-flag visits to a variety of ports, and performing naval exercises and other duties. In 1949, Gabbard, escorting Vengeance once more, deployed to the cold climate of the Arctic for experiments in that region.

In 1950, Gabbard, along with a number of other vessels of the Home Fleet, including three aircraft carriers, such as Victorious, and the battleship Vanguard, undertook a Spring cruise, visiting the Mediterranean, where the Group performed a number of fly-the-flag visits to port, and naval exercises. In 1953, Gabbard decommissioned, and was subsequently placed in Reserve.

== Sale to Pakistan ==
On 29 February 1956 the Admiralty announced that Gabbard was being sold to the Pakistan Navy. She was refitted and modernized with funds made available by the United States Mutual Defence Assistance Programme and commissioned as PNS Badr (D-161). The refit was undertaken by Palmers Hebburn, Yarrow. She was handed over to the Pakistan Navy on 24 January 1957 and sailed from Portsmouth to Karachi on 17 February 1957. During the war of 1965 Badr participated in Operation Dwarka

== Publications ==
- Colledge, J. J.; Warlow, Ben (2006) [1969]. Ships of the Royal Navy: The Complete Record of All Fighting Ships of the Royal Navy from the 15th Century to the Present (3rd Rev ed.). London: Chatham Publishing. ISBN 978-1-86176-281-8. OCLC 67375475.
- Hodges, Peter (1971). Battle Class Destroyers. London: Almark Publishing. ISBN 0-85524-012-1.
