= HMS Crispin (R68) =

C-class destroyer

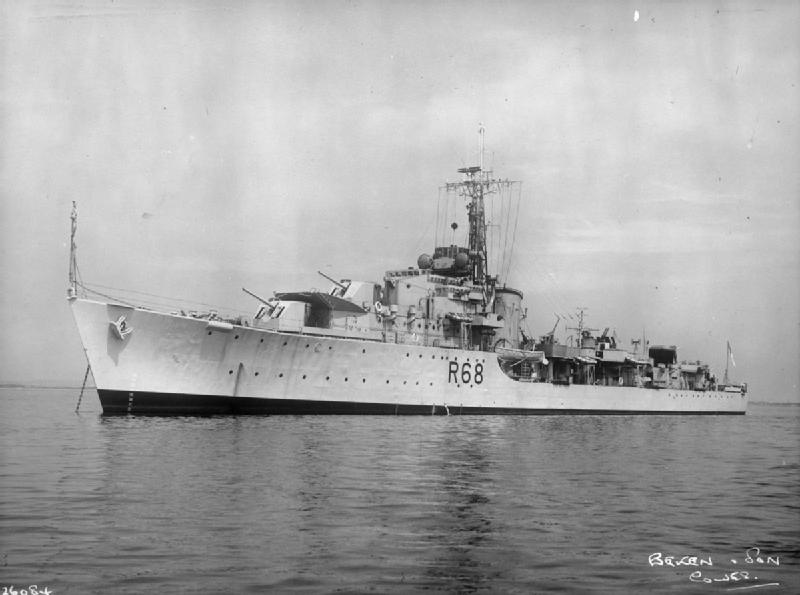
- HMS Crispin in 1946

History

United Kingdom
- Name: HMS Crispin (ex-Craccher)
- Builder: J. Samuel White, Cowes
- Yard number: 1931
- Laid down: 1 February 1944
- Launched: 23 June 1945
- Commissioned: 10 July 1946
- Out of service: 18 March 1958
- Identification: Pennant number: R68, changed to D168
- Fate: Sold to the Pakistan Navy

Pakistan
- Name: PNS Jahangir
- Commissioned: 18 March 1958
- Home port: Karachi
- Identification: Pennant number:162
- Fate: Scrapped 1982

General characteristics
- Class & type: C-class destroyer
- Displacement: 1,710 tons (standard) 2,520 tons (full)
- Length: 363 ft (111 m) o/a
- Beam: 35.75 ft (10.90 m)
- Draught: 10 ft (3.0 m) light; 14.5 ft (4.4 m) full
- Propulsion: 2 Admiralty 3-drum boilers, Parsons geared steam turbines, 40,000 shp (30,000 kW), 2 shafts
- Speed: 37 knots (69 km/h)
- Range: 615 tons oil, 1,400 nautical miles (2,600 km) at 32 knots (59 km/h)
- Complement: 186
- Armament: 4 × QF 4.5 in (114 mm) L/45 guns Mark IV on mounts CP Mk.V; 2 × Bofors 40 mm L/60 guns on twin mount "Hazemeyer" Mk.IV; 4 × anti-aircraft mountings; Bofors 40 mm, single mount Mk.III; QF 2-pdr Mk VIII, single mount Mk.XVI; Oerlikon 20 mm, single mount P Mk.III; Oerlikon 20 mm, twin mount Mk.V; 1 × quadruple tubes for 21 inch (533 mm) torpedoes Mk.IX; 2 × Squid ASW mortars (after 1956)

HMS Crispin was a C-class destroyer of the Royal Navy built by J. Samuel White, Cowes between 1944 and 1946. She was originally to have been named HMS Craccher. She was sold to the Pakistan Navy in 1958 and renamed PNS Jahangir. She was scrapped in 1982.

She was the second Royal Navy ship to be named Crispin. The first HMS Crispin was an ocean boarding vessel that was requisitioned in 1940 and sunk in 1941.

== History in the Royal Navy ==
Commissioned too late for service in the Second World War, her pennant number was soon changed to D168. Along with HMS Creole she was the only 'Cr' group ship to see service with the Royal Navy. The rest served with another navies. Both served with the 3rd Training Squadron based in Derry. Both ships had their 'B' gun turret removed in 1948 and replaced with a deckhouse. In 1953 she took part in the Coronation Review of the Fleet to celebrate the Coronation of Queen Elizabeth II. In 1954 both ships were laid up in reserve.

== History in the Pakistan Navy ==
Crispin was sold to the Pakistan Navy on 29 February 1956 and renamed Jahangir. Before being transferred she was given a refit by Thornycroft at Woolston. As part of this refit the gun turret was reinstated in 'B' position. The gun at 'X' position was removed and replaced by two Squid anti-submarine mortars. She was formally handed over to the Pakistan Navy at Southampton on 18 March 1958. The refit and transfer was made under a US contract and transferred to the Pakistan Navy as part of the Military Assistance Program.

Jahangir continued to serve in the Pakistan Navy until scrapped in 1982.

== Publications ==
- Colledge, J. J.; Warlow, Ben (2006) [1969]. Ships of the Royal Navy: The Complete Record of All Fighting Ships of the Royal Navy from the 15th Century to the Present (3rd Rev ed.). London: Chatham Publishing. ISBN 978-1-86176-281-8. OCLC 67375475.
- Marriott, Leo (1989). Royal Navy Destroyers Since 1945. Ian Allan Ltd. ISBN 0-7110-1817-0.
