= Commodore (Pakistan) =

Third-highest rank in Pakistan navy

- Flag of Commodore, Pakistan Navy

- The shoulder stars, shoulder boards, and sleeve stripes of a Pakistani Navy commodore of the "line".

- The star insignia of a Pakistani Navy commodore
- Country: Pakistan
- Service branch: Pakistan Navy; Pakistan Marines; Inter-Services Public Relations
- Abbreviation: CDRE, CDREPN
- Rank: One-star
- NATO rank code: OF-6
- Non-NATO rank: O-7
- Next higher rank: Rear Admiral
- Next lower rank: Captain
- Equivalent ranks: Brigadier (Pakistan Army); Air commodore (Pakistan Air Force)

Commodore /kəmədr/ (abbreviated as CDRE or CDREPN) is a one-star commissioned armed senior officer rank in the Pakistan Navy, and marines. It is the fourth-highest rank in Pakistan armed services with a NATO code of OF-6, it is worn on epaulettes with a one-star insignia, it ranks above OF-5 rank Captain and below two-star rank Rear Admiral. Commodore is equivalent to the rank of Brigadier of Pakistan Army and Air Commodore of the Pakistan Air Force. A Pakistani Commodore rank may be abbreviated as CDREPN to distinguish it from the same ranks offered in other countries, although there is no official abbreviation available for a Pakistani commodore.

Commodore (rank) in the Pakistan Navy is not authorised to have a flag lieutenant as it is not an Admiral rank. Commodore rank is only considered as the most junior of the flag officer rank when commanding senior military appointments (typically of 1 star level), principle staff commands (as acting if higher rank typically of 2 or 3 star temporarily not present or available), operational and type commands (typically of 1 star level) in Pakistan Navy.

== Gallery ==
Insignia of a one-star, Air commodore

Insignia of one-star Brigadier Pakistan

The discontinued shoulder and sleeve insignia of a Pakistani Air commodore
