= HMS Diadem (84) =

Cruiser of the Royal Navy

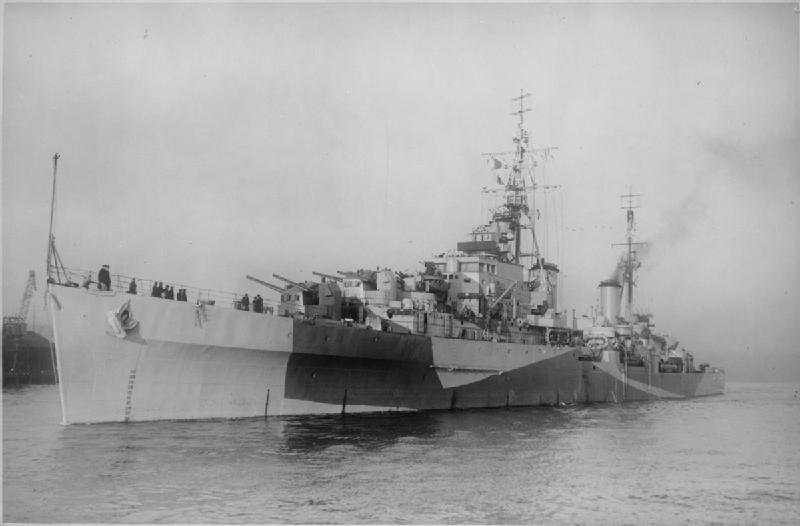
- Diadem at anchor

History

United Kingdom
- Name: Diadem
- Builder: R. & W. Hawthorn, Leslie and Co., Ltd, (Hebburn-on-Tyne
- Laid down: 15 December 1939
- Launched: 26 August 1942
- Completed: 6 January 1944
- Decommissioned: 1950
- Reclassified: In reserve between 1950 and 1956
- Identification: Pennant number: 84
- Fate: Sold to the Pakistan Navy, 29 February 1956

Pakistan
- Name: Babur
- Acquired: 29 February 1956
- Commissioned: 5 July 1957
- Renamed: Jahangir, 1982
- Fate: Broken up 1985

General characteristics (as built)
- Class & type: Dido-class light cruiser
- Displacement: 5,950 tons standard; 7,200 tons full load
- Length: 485 ft (148 m) pp; 512 ft (156 m) oa
- Beam: 50.5 ft (15.4 m)
- Draught: 14 ft (4.3 m)
- Propulsion: 4 geared steam turbines; Four shafts; Four Admiralty 3-drum boilers; 62,000 shp (46,000 kW)
- Speed: 32.25 knots (59.73 km/h; 37.11 mph)
- Range: 2,414 km (1,303 nmi; 1,500 mi) at 30 knots (56 km/h; 35 mph); 6,824 km (3,685 nmi; 4,240 mi) at 16 knots (30 km/h; 18 mph)
- Complement: 530
- Armament: 8 × QF 5.25-inch (133 mm) dual guns, 6 × 20 mm dual AA guns, 3 × 2-pounder (40-mm) pom-poms quad guns, 2 × British 21 inch (533mm) torpedo triple torpedo tubes
- Armor: Belt: 3 in (76 mm); Deck: 1 in (25 mm); Magazines: 2 in (51 mm); Bulkheads: 1 in (25 mm)

HMS Diadem was a Dido-class light cruiser of the Bellona subgroup of the Royal Navy. She was a modified Dido design with only four turrets but improved anti-aircraft armament – also known as Dido Group 2. She was built by Hawthorn Leslie and Company at Hebburn-on-Tyne, UK, with the keel being laid down on 15 December 1939. She was launched on 26 August 1942, and completed on 6 January 1944.

== Service history ==
=== Royal Navy service ===
Diadem served on the Arctic convoys and covered carrier raids against the German battleship Tirpitz in the early months of 1944, then became part of Force G off Juno Beach during the invasion of Normandy in June. After the landings she carried out offensive patrols against German shipping around the Brittany coast, sinking, with destroyers, Sperrbrecher 7 off La Rochelle on 12 August. She returned to northern waters in September, where she covered Russian convoys and carrier raids against German shipping routes along the Norwegian coast, as well as making offensive sweeps herself. In the course of one such sweep, accompanied by HMS Mauritius on 28 January 1945, the cruiser engaged three German destroyers, damaging Z31. Diadem remained with the 10th Cruiser Squadron until after the war, and served in the Home Fleet until 1950. She was placed in reserve between 1950 and 1956. A more extensive modernisation than HMS Royalist's 1953-6 refit with new boilers and anti-nuclear washdown for Diadem as NATO flagship and AA/AD escort was canceled in 1954 on grounds of cost, the manual hand loaded armament requiring lifting 82lb shells, lack of space for crew and the non military functions of a cruiser, entertaing potential friends of Britain and carrying disaster relief resources. The transfer of Diadem to Pakistan was on the pretext the ship would serve as a training ship, but in fact was a RN move, to balance the INS purchase of HMS Nigeria as arranged by First Lord Mountbatten in 1955

She was sold to the Pakistan Navy (announced) 29 February 1956 and refitted at Portsmouth Dockyard before being handed over to the Pakistan Navy as Babur on 5 July 1957.

=== Pakistan service ===
The refit was substantial, the light armament was standardised, fourteen new L60 40mm guns in three twin Mk 5 mounts and eight single Mk 7 mounts as on INS Mysore (ex-HMS Nigeria). Radar was substantially updated to Type 974 navigation, Type 293 target indicator and air warning 281B at near 960 capability and ADR similar to HMS Euralyus the last operational RN Dido 11/1954. A new bridge was fitted and the ship tropicalised. Surface and long range AA for the 5.25 turrets remained (2)WW2 standard 984/985 as on INS Delhi. She was renamed Babur, after the founder of the Mogul empire. The cost of the refit far exceeded the £400,000 allocated by the Pakistan Government even supplemented with a 0.25 million dollar, US MDAP aid grant, and the refit by the Royal Navy dockyard, charged below cost. Pakistan still had to meet a huge shortfall in the bill. It had been known from the start of 1956 that the refit cost would exceed Pakistan's budget, but the new First Sea Lord, Mountbatten, the last Viceroy of India, was determined Pakistan would have a cruiser, as was head of Pakistan's navy Choudri. Despite his government's attempt to first cancel the deal in mid-1957, then demand the cruiser be decommissioned as an extravagance when it arrived in 1958, the British Government demanded a payment, which even the British Far East Command considered outrageous and likely to promote a political crisis. Defence cuts saw it temporarily laid up as a fully manned static training ship for cadets in 1961. However the cruiser was back in full operational service by 1963 and took part in Operation Dwarka after India invaded Pakistan during the 1965 conflict. Babur carried out a shore bombardment of Dwarka in September 1965. Fitting the cruiser with Styx missiles was considered in 1968 to counter the Soviet missiles purchased by India, but Russia was only prepared to offer the missile for fast attack craft, not larger warships. The outbreak of war with India in December 1971 saw Babur deployed as one of Pakistan's few available large warships, taking station 70 miles west of Karachi in an outer patrol zone, intending to protect the major ports of West Pakistan and oil tankers from the Gulf. Light 37mm AA and 40/60 Bofors at Karachi and other ports discouraged low level Indian Air Force bombing, below 2 miles high in IAF Canberra raids that occurred on Karachi. This led India to develop a plan to use its Styx-equipped Osa-class missile boats squadron with only Russian spoken in the Osa boats operation rooms for security, deception and commonality with the Indian officers trained in Russia for its major strike against the Pakistan Navy and the Karachi port installations and oil refineries. As the Osa missile boat squadron one Pakistan Battle class destroyers was sunk by 2 Styx missiles and another secondhand Pakistan destroyer of the RN C class was massively damaged by another Styx (both the Battle and C class Destroyers were still in RN service itself at the time in 1971). The 27 year old cruiser Babur somehow being missed, possibly due to its fitting with standard USN ESM/ECM similar to HMAS Yarram enabling the Babur to electronically black itself out in time. Later during the night, after the failure of repeated Indian air force air strikes the Karachi tank farm of oil storage facilities, were hit by Styx missiles from Osa missile boats causing a firestorm. Babur lacking anti-missile protection and ability to identify air and surface unit attacks was recalled to the naval base as a static flag ship. In 1982 it was renamed Jahangir as it was replaced by the newly purchased County-class destroyer HMS London, which itself was renamed Babur. Jahanqir was broken up in 1985.

== Publications ==
- Campbell, N.J.M. (1980). "Great Britain". In Chesneau, Roger (ed.). Conway's All the World's Fighting Ships 1922–1946. New York: Mayflower Books. pp. 2–85. ISBN 0-8317-0303-2.
- Colledge, J. J.; Warlow, Ben (2006) [1969]. Ships of the Royal Navy: The Complete Record of All Fighting Ships of the Royal Navy from the 15th Century to the Present (3rd Rev ed.). London: Chatham Publishing. ISBN 978-1-86176-281-8. OCLC 67375475.
- Friedman, Norman (2010). British Cruisers: Two World Wars and After. Barnsley, UK: Seaforth Publishing. ISBN 978-1-59114-078-8.
- Lenton, H. T. (1998). British & Empire Warships of the Second World War. Annapolis, Maryland: Naval Institute Press. ISBN 1-55750-048-7.
- Raven, Alan & Roberts, John (1980). British Cruisers of World War Two. Annapolis, Maryland: Naval Institute Press. ISBN 0-87021-922-7.
- Rohwer, Jürgen (2005). Chronology of the War at Sea 1939–1945: The Naval History of World War Two (Third Revised ed.). Annapolis, Maryland: Naval Institute Press. ISBN 1-59114-119-2.
- Whitley, M. J. (1995). Cruisers of World War Two: An International Encyclopedia. London: Cassell. ISBN 1-86019-874-0.
