= Seaman Service Book (Pakistan) =

Service Book issued in Pakistan

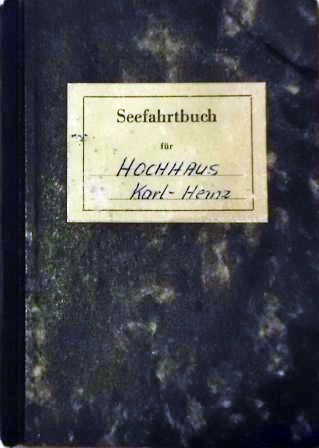
2010 10 31 Seefahrtbuch DSCI1149.

Seaman Service Book (SSB) is a continuous record of a seaman’s service. This document certifies that the person holding is a seaman as per the International Convention on Standards of Training, Certification and Watch keeping for Seafarers (STCW), 1978, as amended from time to time. Seaman Book is one of the compulsory document for applying crew transit visas. The record of employment on board of a merchant ship (sea service) is recorded in a Seaman Service Book. Different countries issue to their seafarers the similar service book with different names i.e. Seaman Record Book, Seaman Discharge Book etc.

In Pakistan, the Government Shipping Office issue this book under section 120 of Merchant Shipping Ordinance, 2001. It is mandatory for all seafarers serving on board ship, whether they are on the Minimum Safe Manning Certificate or not, to hold a "Seaman Service Book and Seaman Identity Document" (SID).

== SSB holders in the country ==
Prior to 1990, the Pakistan government was practicing the policy for issuance of CDC (now SSB) only to a certain number per year in order to ensure the availability of job to each and every seamen holding CDC under roster system. Earlier, there was just one government-owned institute, namely Pakistan Marine Academy, however, after promulgation of Merchant Shipping Ordinance (2001) institutes in private sector have allowed to offer training to seamen for issuance of SSB according to their qualification and out of 10 approved institutes, five are actively conducting their business of training and education in accordance with STCW Convention. This has increased number of SSB holders in Pakistan in access of demand. About 40% of Pakistani seafarers are jobless for a long time. However, Government Shipping Office discloses that there are about 8,000 officers and 10,500 ratings duly registered as seamen. Out of this total number of registered seamen about 30% are employed on national as well as foreign ships. The employment on foreign ships is about 85% of the total seamen engaged in this field.

== See also ==
- Pakistan Merchant Navy
- Government Shipping Office
- Shipping Master
- Continuous Discharge Certificate
- Merchant Mariner Credential
- Merchant Mariner's Document
