= Mercantile Marine Department =

Ministry of Ports and Shipping, Pakistan
- ادارہ بحری تجارت، پاکستان
- Seal of Government of Pakistan

Agency overview
- Formed: April 19, 1930; 96 years ago
- Jurisdiction: Pakistan
- Headquarters: Karachi, Pakistan
- Agency executive: Syedain Raza Zaidi (DG Ports & Shipping), Ports and Shipping Wing; Principal Officer
- Website: Official Website

Mercantile Marine Department, Pakistan (Urdu: ادارہ بحری تجارت، پاکستان) is an attached department of Ports and Shipping Wing, Karachi under the Ministry of Ports and Shipping, Government of Pakistan. The department was established in 1930 under the Merchant Shipping Act, 1923, which was repealed and replaced with Merchant Shipping Ordinance No. L II of 2001 (Laws relating to Merchant Shipping) in 2001. The department is headed by the Principal Officer who is also Registrar of Ships and Superintendent of Light Houses in Pakistan.

== Surveyors of MMD ==
Ports & Shipping Wing is also the Maritime Safety Administration of Pakistan. The Government of Pakistan plays its role in the International Maritime Organization (IMO) through this Wing. The functions of Maritime Administration of Pakistan are mainly discharged by the professionals serving on the Technical Posts of this Ministry. Out of 15 Surveyors of the Ministry of Ports & Shipping, approx 11 surveyors (both Nautical and Engineering) work in the Mercantile Marine Department. Recruitment to Technical Posts in the Ports & Shipping Wing is made keeping in view the national & international standards and ensuring induction of experienced and qualified professionals for the pure technical jobs. However, Ports and Shipping Wing is facing acute shortage of surveyors and examiners. According to General Secretary of Marine Academy Old Boys Association (MAcOBA) this situation may determinate the good reputation of Pakistan, particularly to its listing to The White List of IMO.

== Online verification ==
Certificates of Competency (CoC) issued by the Ports & Shipping Wing to Deck Officers and Engineer Officers, as well as Rating Certificates by the MMD itself, are verifiable globally at the sub-portal of MMD’s official website.

== See also ==
- Pakistan Merchant Navy
- Government Shipping Office
- Shipping Master
- Ministry of Maritime Affairs (Pakistan)
