= Gwadar Eastbay Expressway =

Road in Gwadar, Pakistan

Gwadar Eastbay Expressway مشرقی خلیج بزرگرہ

Route information
- Maintained by Gwadar Port Authority
- Length: 19 km (12 mi)
- Existed: 3 June 2022–present

Major junctions
- From: Makran Coastal Highway
- To: Port of Gwadar

Location
- Country: Pakistan

Highway system
- Roads in Pakistan

The Gwadar Eastbay Expressway (Urdu: مشرقی خلیج بزرگرہ, Balochi: دیمی زر بزرگرہ) is a municipal expressway in Gwadar, Balochistan, Pakistan, that connects the southwestern Gwadar Port to Pakistan's largest city, Karachi, via the Makran Coastal Highway.

Construction began on 22 November 2017, and the six-lane 19.5 km expressway was inaugurated by Pakistani Prime Minister Shehbaz Sharif on 3 June 2022. The expressway was built at a cost of Rs. 32 billion ($162 million). The Ministry of Maritime Affairs supervised the project. The project is developed as part of the "Early Harvest" scheme of China–Pakistan Economic Corridor (CPEC), and is part of a wider Rs. 170.667 billion (US$610 million) development package for the city and Port of Gwadar.

On 10 August 2025, the construction of the Gwadar Eastbay Expressway Phase-II, which will run from the New Gwadar International Airport (NGIA) to the Gwadar Port, was approved by the 8th Joint Working Group (JWG) under CPEC, with the federal government allocating Rs. 200 million for its construction.

== Exits and Junctions ==
Exits and Junctions
Interchange	Northbound Exit	Southbound Exit
Gwadar Port Road	Start of Gwadar East Bay Expressway	Gwadar Port
Jetty Road	Downtown Gwadar	Gwadar Harbour
Old Gwadar Airport Road	Bakshi Baloch Colony	
Makran Coastal Highway junction	Karachi, Makran Coastal Highway	Start of Gwadar East Bay Expressway

== See also ==
- Expressways of Pakistan
