= Ministry of Maritime Affairs (Pakistan) =

Ministry of the Government of Pakistan

- وزارت بحری امور

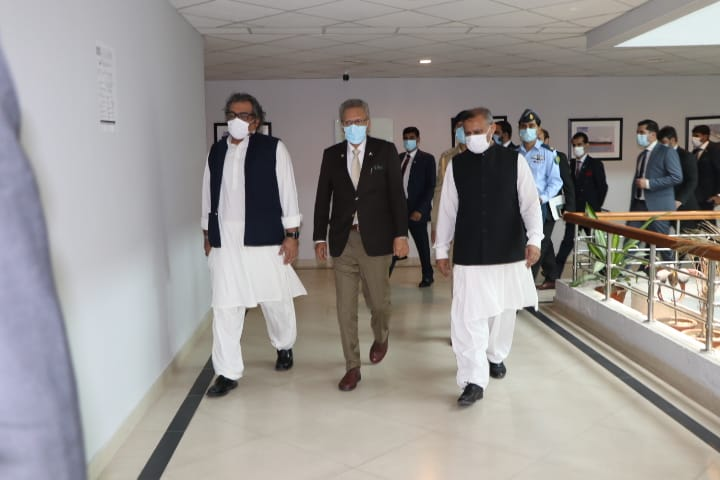
- President Arif Alvi's visit to the Maritime Ministry flanked by Rizwan Ahmed and Ali Haider Zaidi

Agency overview
- Formed: September 2004; 22 years ago
- Preceding agency: Ministry of Ports and Shipping
- Jurisdiction: Government of Pakistan
- Headquarters: Islamabad, Islamabad Capital Territory
- Minister responsible: Muhammad Junaid Anwar Chaudhry, Federal Minister for Maritime Affairs
- Agency executives: Capt. (Retd.) Muhammad Khurram Agha, Maritime Secretary of Pakistan
- Website: www.moma.gov.pk

The Ministry of Maritime Affairs (Urdu: وزارت بحری امور), previously known as the Ministry of Ports and Shipping, is a Federal Ministry of the Government of Pakistan. The current Minister for Maritime Affairs is Muhammad Junaid Anwar Chaudhry and the current Federal Secretary for Maritime Affairs is Nadeem Mehbub. The longest-serving Federal Secretary for Ports and Shipping are Muhammad Saleem Khan and Rizwan Ahmed. The Ministry is headquartered in Islamabad and its main attached departments are in the port city of Karachi.

== Hierarchy ==
The Ministry is headed by the Maritime Secretary of Pakistan. Keeping in view its close links with the seaports, a division of the Ministry of Maritime Affairs is established in Karachi which includes a number of attached departments/organisations, each headed by a high-grade civil servant or bureaucrat.

== Wings and attached departments ==
- Government Shipping Office
- Karachi Port Trust
- Korangi Fish Harbour
- Marine Fisheries Department
- Mercantile Marine Department
- Pakistan Marine Academy
- Pakistan National Shipping Corporation
- Gwadar Port Authority
- Port Qasim Authority
- Ports and Shipping Wing, Karachi

== History ==
- Before 2004, Ports and Shipping was a subject and part of the Ministry of Communications.
- In 2004, the Ministry of Ports and Shipping emerged as a separate and independent Federal Ministry of the Government of Pakistan.
- In October 2017, the Ministry was again restructured and renamed as Ministry of Maritime Affairs.

== Role of Ministry ==
The Ministry officials look over the administrative and policy matters of the Federal Ministry including policies, procedures, rules and regulations. Apart from that, the attached wings and departments established in Karachi deal with their respective domains under the administration of the Federal Ministry of Maritime Affairs.

== See also ==
- List of ports in Pakistan
- Economy of Pakistan
- Pakistan Merchant Navy
- Pakistan Merchant Shipping Ordinance 2001
- Port of Karachi
- Gwadar Port
- Master Mariner
- Shipping Master
- Pakistan Islands Development Authority
