= Pakistan Merchant Shipping Ordinance 2001 =

The Pakistan Merchant Shipping Ordinance 2001 has replaced the Merchant Shipping Act of 1923. This replacement was made in 2001 to deal with the constantly changing and modern shipping industry. The purpose of the Pakistan Merchant Shipping Ordinance 2001 is to provide a framework and rules under which the Government Authorities will function in dealing with matters related to the shipping industry. This law also covers obligations internationally required under the ILO conventions as Pakistan being an active member of the ILO.

== Background ==
The Merchant Shipping Act of 1923 is the basis for this Ordinance. It was amended and presented as the Pakistan Merchant Shipping Ordinance in 2001

== Implementation ==
Ministry of Maritime Affairs, being the Maritime Administration of Pakistan ensures the implementation of this statutory obligation through its departments such as the Mercantile Marine Department, the Government Shipping Office., and autonomous bodies like Karachi Port Trust, Port Qasim Authority, Gwadur Port Authority, Pakistan National Shipping Corporation, etc.

== See also ==
- Ministry of Maritime Affairs (Pakistan)
- Pakistan Merchant Navy
- Mercantile Marine Department
- Government Shipping Office
- Shipping Master
