= East & West Steamship Company =

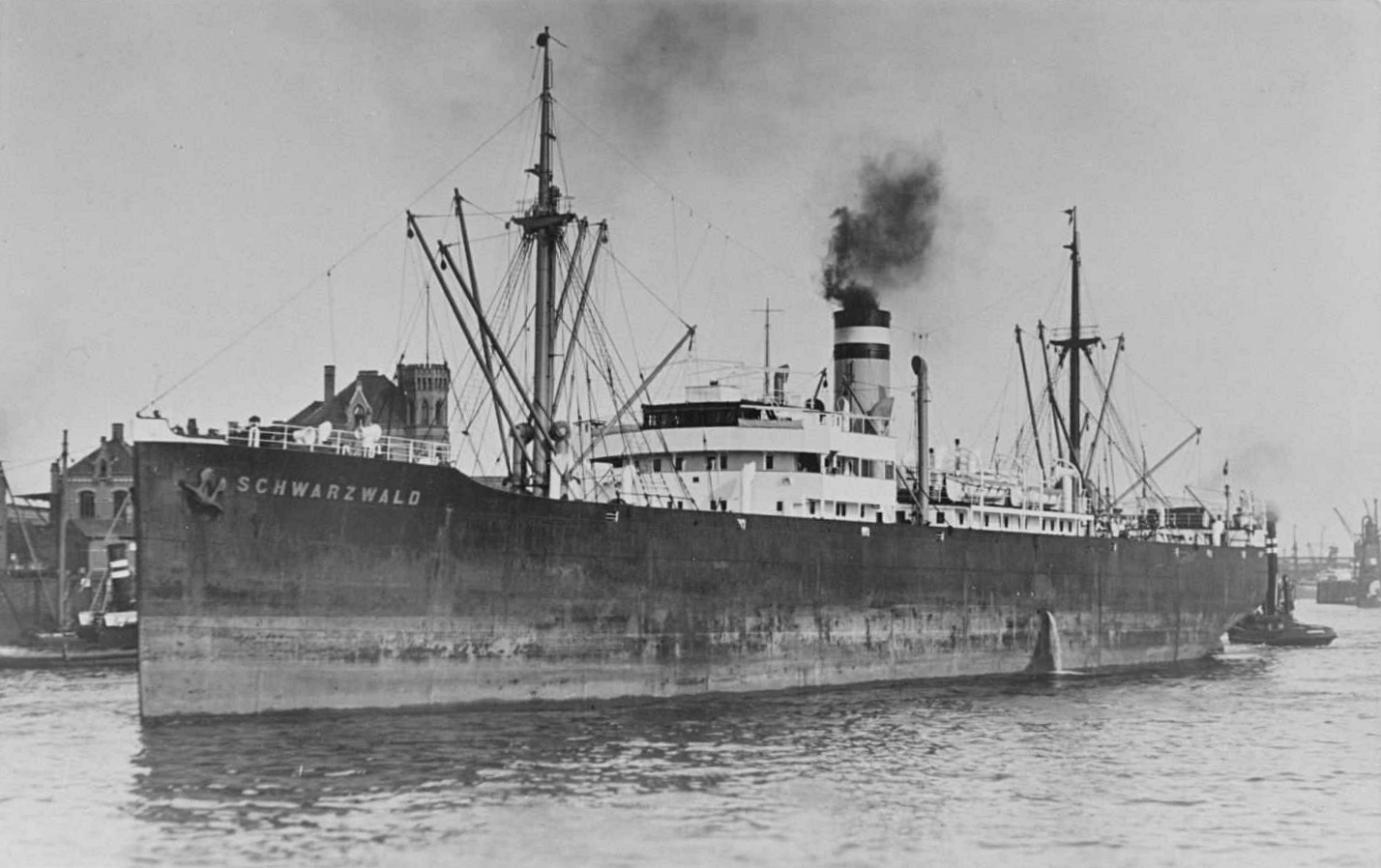
Empire Mariner, which East & West bought in 1951 and renamed Fausta

East & West Steamship Company (ایسٹ اینڈ ویسٹ اسٹیم شپ کمپنی) was one of the oldest locally owned shipping line in Pakistan until it was nationalised in 1974. Its ship, SS Fatima was the first ship ever registered at the newly established Port of Registry at Karachi in August 1948. It was owned by the Cowasjee family. The company was restructured as the 'East and West Steamship Co. (1961) Ltd.' from 1961

== Directors ==
The following individuals were directors of the company at one time or another.

- Rustom Faqirji Cowasjee
- Ardeshir Cowasjee
- Cyrus Cowasjee

== Agents ==
The company served as agents for Nippon Yusen Kaisha, Tokyo, Japan and The Great Eastern Shipping Company Limited of Bombay (now Mumbai), India.

== Ships ==
Ship	Built	In service for Company	Type	Tonnage	Fate	Notes
SS Fatima	1942	1948 – 1956	Steel; cargo ship	671 GRT	Broken up in March 1962	Built as HMIS Shillong (naval trawler) by Burn & Co. Ltd., Calcutta, converted in 1948
SS Figura	1943	1948 – post 1959	Steel; cargo ship	482 GRT		Built as HMIS Cuttack (naval trawler) by Burn & Co. Ltd., Calcutta, converted in 1949
SS Firishta	1942	1948 – post 1959	Steel; cargo ship	467 GRT		Built as HMIS Poona (naval trawler) by Hooghly Dkg. & Engineering Co. Ltd., Calcutta, converted in 1948
SS Fritha	1942	1948? – post 1959	Steel; cargo ship	467 GRT		Built as HMIS Agra (naval trawler) by Hooghly Dkg. & Engineering Co. Ltd., Calcutta, converted in 1948
SS Forma	1941	1948? – post 1959	Steel; tug	471 GRT		Built as HMIS Travancore (naval trawler) by Garden Reach Workshop Ltd., Calcutta, converted in 1952
SS Fravarta	1942	1948 – post 1959	Steel; tug	445 GRT		Built as HMIS Karachi (naval trawler) by Alcock, Ashdwon & Co. Ltd., Bombay, converted in 1949
SS Firoza	1913	1947 – 1966	Steel; cargo ship	4,279 GRT	Broken up at Karachi in October 1966	Built as Falls City by Ropner & Co. Ltd., Stockton-on-Tees
SS Firdausa	1923	1949 – 1963	Steel; cargo ship	7,938 GRT	Broken up at Karachi in April 1963	Built as London Importer by Furness SB Company, Haverton Hill
SS Futura	1919	1951 – 1960	Steel; cargo ship	6,869 GRT	Broken up at Karachi in October 1960	Built as Crosskeys by Skinner & Eddy, Seattle
SS Fausta	1922	1951 – 1963	Steel; cargo ship	5,055 GRT	Broken up at Karachi in October 1963	Built as Schwarzwald by Deutsche Werft, Hamburg
SS Fatakarda later Minocher Cowasjee	1920	1950 – 1957	Steel; cargo ship	6,640 GRT	Foundered in 1957 Reported 24/01/1957 in distress in position 25.30S 68.00E, on passage Dairen for Cape Town and Antwerp	Built as 'Parisiana' by Irvine's Shipbuilding & Drydocks & Co., West Hartlepool. Renamed from 'Fatakarda' to 'Minocher Cowasjee' in 1955.
SS Fakirjee Cowasjee	1925	1952 – 1967	Steel; cargo ship	5,328 GRT	Broken up at Karachi in June 1967	Built as 'Manchester Commerce' by Furness S.B. Company, Haverton Hill
SS Feronia	1940	1958 – 1970	Steel; cargo ship	5,095 GRT	Broken up at Karachi in September 1970	Built as Orient City by Furness SB Company, Haverton Hill
MV Rustom	1953	1961 – 1974	Steel; passenger & cargo liner	9,547 GRT	Broken up at Gadani Beach in November 1980	Built as Santa Teresa by Howaldtswerke, Hamburg
MV Ohrmazd	1968	1968 – 1974	Steel; passenger & cargo liner	11,046 GRT	Broken up at Gadani Beach, arrived 6 July 1994	Built by Burntisland Shipbuilding Company, Fife, Scotland

=== Lost ships ===
- Fakira was lost in 1956 in the China Sea.
- Minocher Cowasjee foundered on 24 January 1957 in the Indian Ocean.

== Burntisland Shipbuilding Company ==
The penalties imposed on the Burntisland Shipbuilding Company in Scotland for the delays in completion of the Ohrmazd in 1968 proved too much for the Scottish company and caused it to go into liquidation.

== Court cases ==
The company's agent, M.N. Sidhwa was involved in an income tax court case in August 1962, which was decided against it.

== Nationalisation ==
During the nationalisation drive of Prime Minister, Zulfikar Ali Bhutto, the company was merged into Pakistan National Shipping Corporation (PNSC). The owners took this nationalisation to court, whereby the Supreme Court of Pakistan ruled in their favour. The Government assessed compensation at Rs. 97.012 million (2008).

== See also ==
- Cowasjee family
- Ardeshir Cowasjee
- Pakistan Merchant Navy
