= SD18 =

SD18, SD-18 or SD 18 may refer to:

- SD18 (ship type) - a type of cargo ship
- British NVC community SD18 - one of the 16 sand-dune communities in the British National Vegetation Classification system
- Former state highways in South Dakota#Highway 18
- EMD SD18 - an American-built diesel locomotive
