= Maritime Secretary =

Administrative head of the Ministry of Maritime Affairs

Maritime Secretary of Pakistan
- معتمدِ بحری امور پاکستان
- Seat: Islamabad
- Appointer: Prime Minister of Pakistan
- Website: moma.gov.pk

The Maritime Secretary of Pakistan, also referred to as Ports and Shipping Secretary, is the Federal Secretary for the Ministry of Maritime Affairs. The position holder is a BPS-22 grade officer, usually belonging to the Pakistan Administrative Service. The Maritime Secretary is considered to be a coveted slot in the Government of Pakistan, with major organisations such as the Pakistan National Shipping Corporation (PNSC), Karachi Port Trust (KPT), Port Qasim Authority (PQA) and Gwadar Port Authority (GPA) as well as the country's deep sea fishing between the territorial waters base line and the outermost limits of the exclusive economic zone falling under the Secretary's purview.

The current Maritime Secretary is Mr Nadeem Mehbub. Previous maritime secretaries include Rizwan Ahmed, Mumtaz Ali Shah, Fazalur Rehman and Babar Yaqoob Fateh Muhammad.

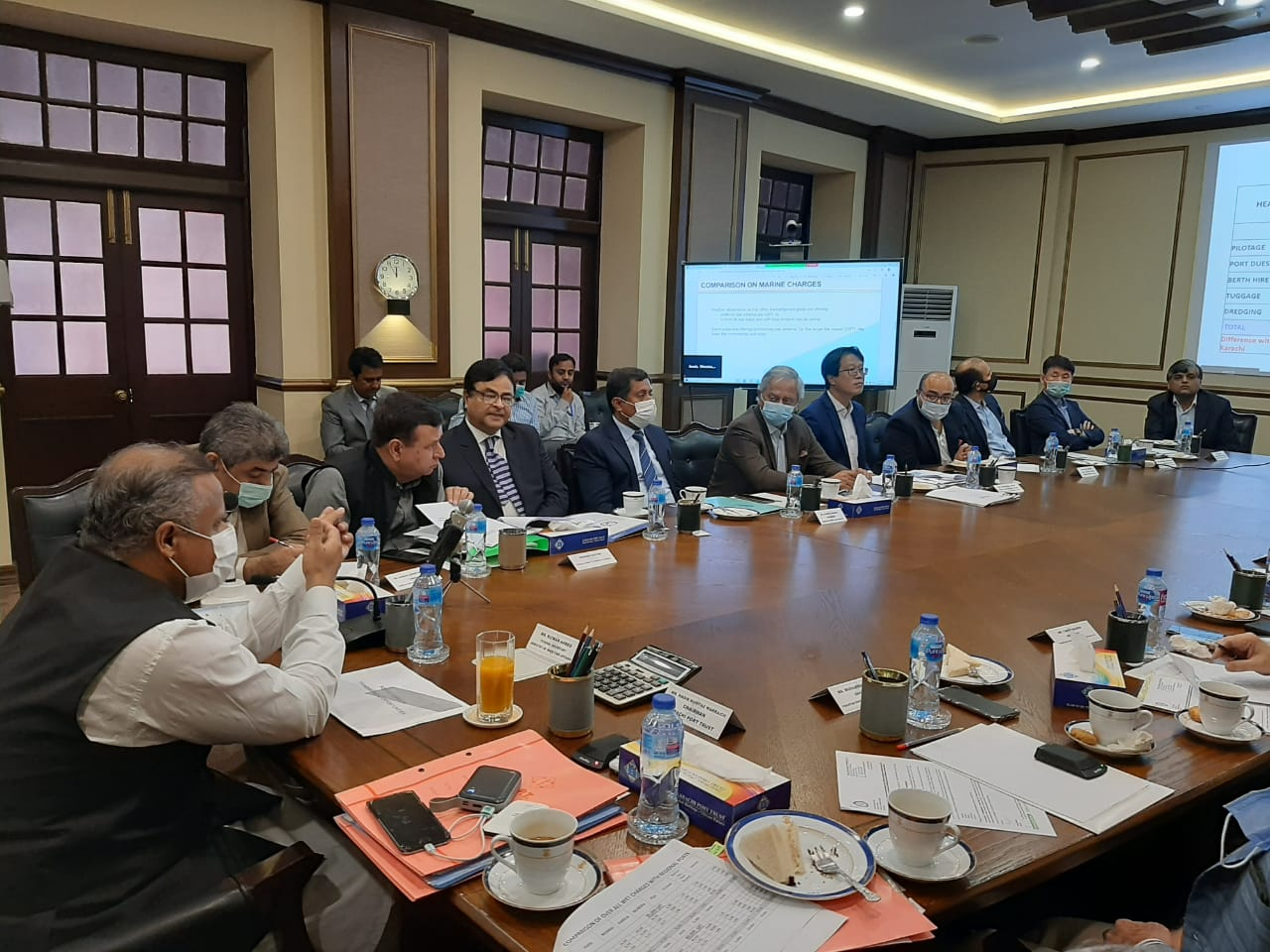
Former Maritime Secretary Rizwan Ahmed chairs a meeting at Karachi Port Trust

The Pakistan Marine Academy, Marine Fisheries Department, Korangi Fish Harbour, Government Shipping Office and Mercantile Marine Department also come under the administrative control of the Maritime Secretary.

== See also ==
- Planning and Development Secretary of Pakistan
- Finance Secretary of Pakistan
- Petroleum Secretary of Pakistan
- Commerce Secretary of Pakistan
