= Master mariner =

Highest level of formally licensed sailor

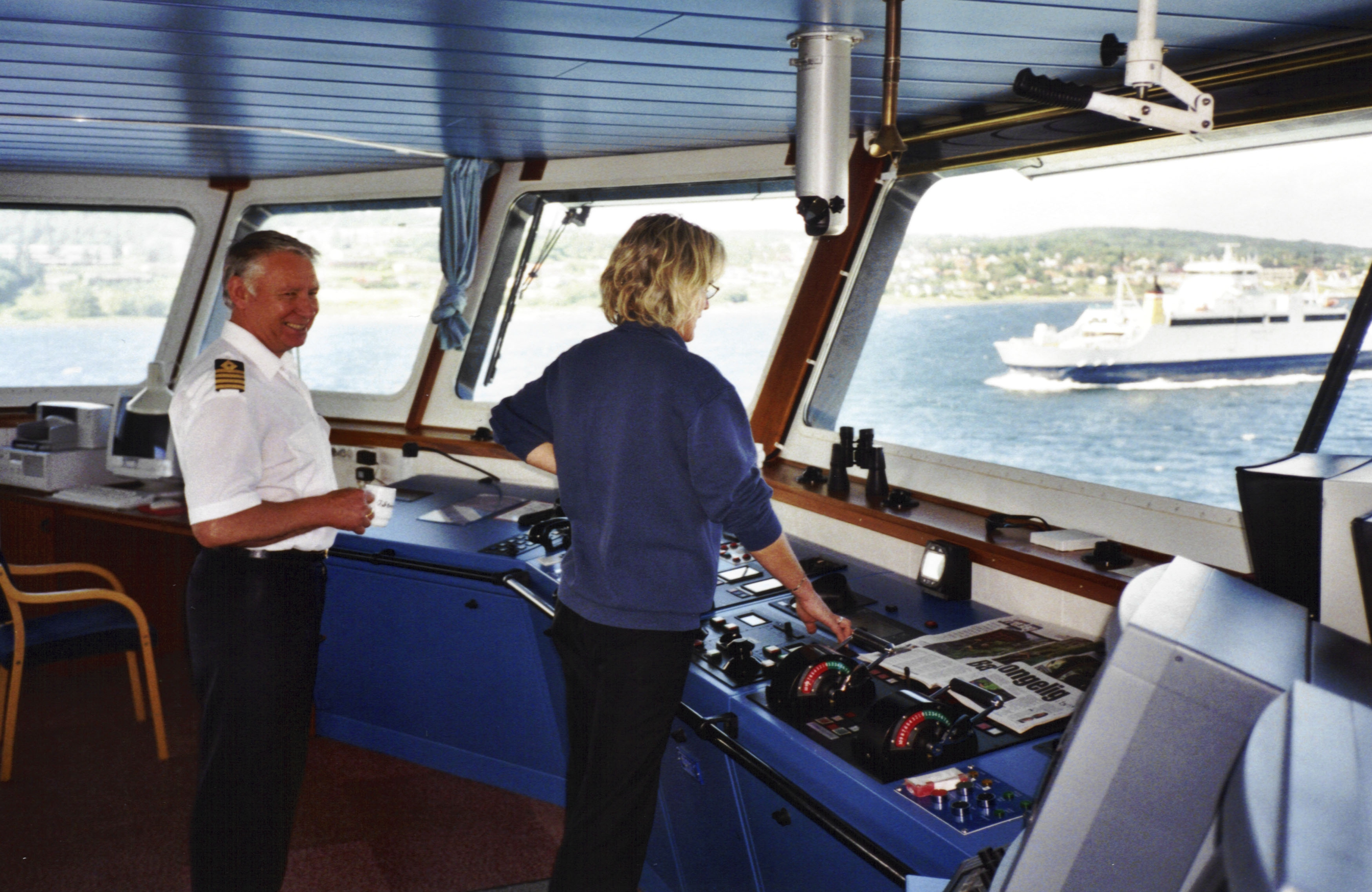
Norwegian master mariner and able seaman on a Norwegian coastal ferry

A master mariner is a licensed mariner who holds the highest grade of licensed seafarer qualification; namely, a master's license. A master mariner is therefore allowed to serve as the master of a merchant ship for which national and international requirements apply under the STCW Convention. Regulation II/2 sets out requirements for Master Mariners. Master mariners can possess either an unlimited certification/licence or one restricted based on tonnage of the ship. Certification is given by national authorities, typically following completion of minimum necessary seatime and a course of approved training, based on the IMO model course. For those with an unlimited certificate, this has no limits on the tonnage, power, or geographic location of the vessel that the holder of the license is allowed to serve upon. An unlimited master mariner would therefore be allowed to serve as the Captain of a ship any size, of any type, operating anywhere in the world, and it reflects the highest level of professional qualification amongst mariners and deck officers. Master certification/licensing is also given with tonnage restrictions of 500 tonnes.

The term master mariner has been in use at least since the 9th century, reflecting the fact that in guild or livery company terms, such a person was a master craftsman in this specific profession (e.g., master carpenter, master blacksmith).

== Norway ==
In Norway, the title of Master mariner is Sjøkaptein and it is a protected title to which holders of a license as deck officer class 1 in accordance with the "Regulations on qualifications and certificates for seafarers" have the exclusive right. The license is the highest qualification document issued to deck officers.

== Poland ==
In Poland, a Master mariner of great shipping (Kapitan żeglugi wielkiej) is the commander of a merchant vessel without restrictions to its tonnage engaged in great (international) shipping.

To be licensed as a Master mariner, the candidate must be:

- Either a licensed senior deck officer on ships of 3000 GRT and over, with an additional 12 months' sea practice of as a senior deck officer on commercial seagoing vessels of 3000 GRT and above in international shipping
- Or a licensed master of ships of 500 to 3000 GRT, with an additional 6 months' sea practice as a senior deck officer on commercial seagoing vessels of 3000 GRT and above in international shipping.
- And pass an qualifying exam as Master mariner of great shipping.

== United Kingdom ==
The Extra Master's qualification (issued only in the United Kingdom), which was discontinued in the 1990s, used to be the highest professional qualification and it was the pinnacle for any mariner to achieve. There are also various other levels of master's certificates, which may be restricted or limited to home trade/near coastal voyages and/or by gross tonnage. The holder of a restricted master's certificate is not referred to as a "master mariner".

In the British Merchant Navy a master mariner who has sailed in command of an ocean-going merchant ship will be titled captain. A professional seafarer who holds a restricted or limited master's certificate who has sailed in command of a ship (i.e. appropriate to the size, power or geographic limits of their certificate) can also be titled captain.

In the UK, an unrestricted master's certificate is colloquially called a "master's ticket" or a "master's". It is sometimes still referred to as a "Class 1" or "Master Foreign-Going" as it was named during the latter part of the 20th century. The conventions or acts governing the certificate have evolved alongside the shipping industry and the official name of a master mariner's qualification has varied over the years. The UK Maritime & Coastguard Agency, in line with the amended STCW convention, currently title the certificate Master Unlimited.

The qualification is awarded to those senior ships officers whose competency has been assessed under the STCW A-II/2 syllabus.

== United States ==
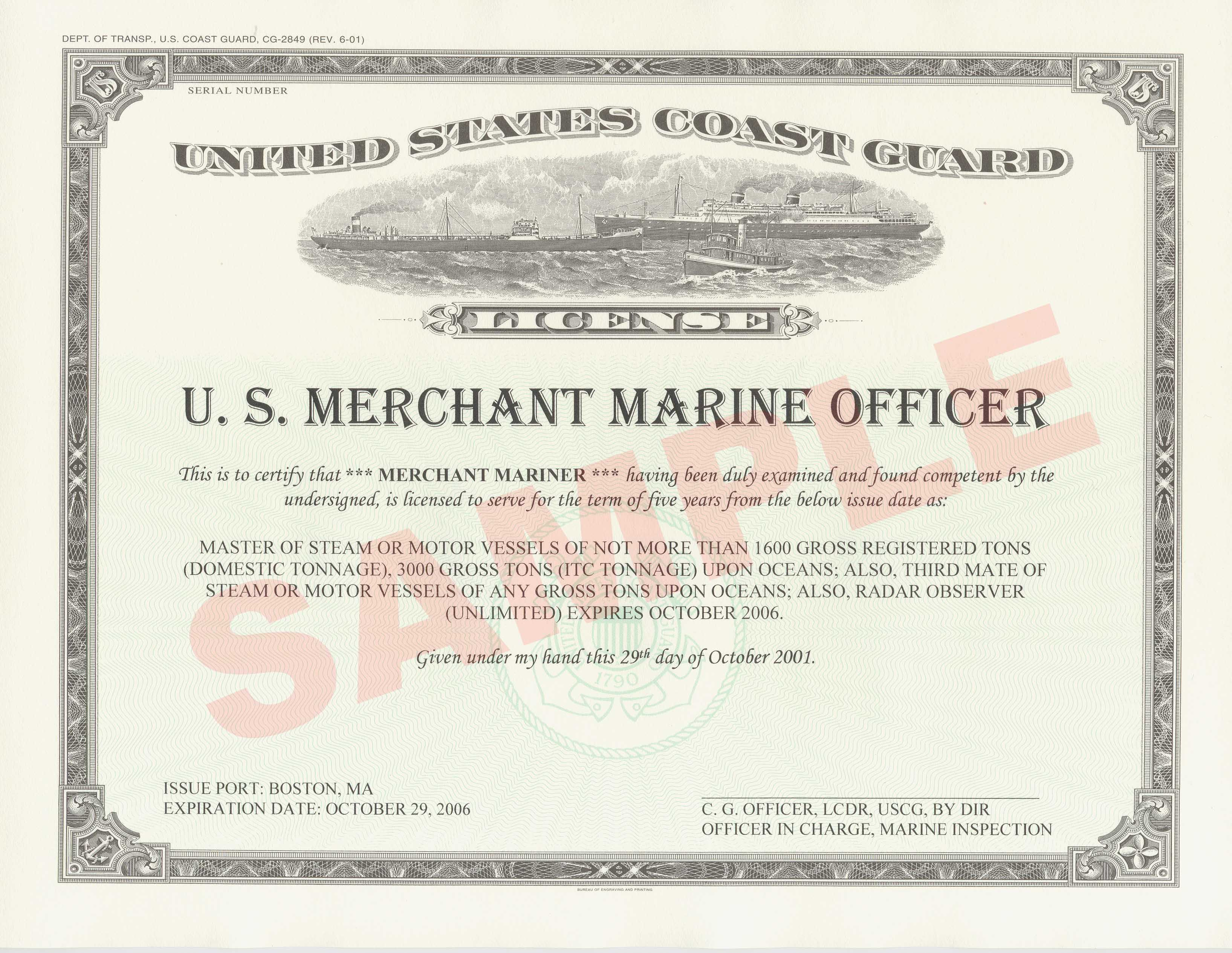
A ship's captain must have a number of qualifications, including a license.

To become a master of vessels of any gross tons upon oceans in the United States, one must first accumulate at least 360 days of service (including 90 days in the most recent three years on vessels of appropriate tonnage) while holding a chief mate's license. The chief mate's license, in turn, requires at least 360 days of service (including 90 days in the most recent three years on vessels of appropriate tonnage) while holding a second mate's license, passing a battery of examinations, and approximately 13 weeks of classes. Similarly, one must have worked as a third mate for 360 days (including 90 days in the most recent three years on vessels of appropriate tonnage) to have become a second mate.

There are two methods to attain an unlimited third mate's license in the United States: to attend a specialized training institution, or to accumulate "sea time" and take a series of training classes and examinations.

Training institutions that can lead to a third mate's license include the U.S. Coast Guard Academy, the U.S. Naval Academy (with approved courses and requisite sea time as an Officer in Charge of a Navigational Watch), the U.S. Merchant Marine Academy (deck curriculum), and the six state maritime academies in California, Maine, Massachusetts, Michigan, New York, and Texas. Third mate's licenses can also be obtained through a three-year apprentice mate training program approved by the Commandant of the U.S. Coast Guard.

A seaman may start the process of obtaining a license after three years of service in the deck department on ocean steam or motor vessels, at least six months of which as able seaman, boatswain, or quartermaster. Then the seaman takes required training courses, and completes on-board assessments. Finally, the mariner can apply to the United States Coast Guard for a third mate's license.

An alternate method of obtaining a license as a master of vessels of any gross tons upon oceans, without sailing as a third, second, or chief mate, is to obtain one year of sea service as a 1st class pilot of any gross tons or mate of vessels of any gross tons upon Great Lakes and inland waters. Then pass an examination for the license of master of vessels of any gross tons upon Great Lakes and inland waters. A master of vessels of any gross tons upon Great Lakes and inland waters may, without any additional sea service, take the examination for master of vessels of any gross tons upon near coastal waters. If the candidate does not already have sufficient deep sea experience he may with six months of additional sea service, in any licensed capacity, take a partial examination consisting primarily of celestial navigation and have the near coastal restriction removed. 46CFR 11.403

A master of 1,600 ton vessels can, under certain circumstances, begin the application process for an unlimited third mate's license.

Some employers offer financial assistance to pay for the training for their employees. Otherwise, the mariner is responsible for the cost of the required training. A Chief Mate to Master formal training generally takes about 12 weeks and provides the knowledge, skills and other soft skills training to take on the duties and responsibilities.

Various US states require and issue shipmaster or captain licenses in order to be employed in operating a vessel for hire while navigating within "non-federal" waters. (Such as a lake or river charter boat "skipper"). Most states honor a USCG master's certificate as an alternative to their state licensing. These state licenses certify that the captain has given satisfactory evidence that they can safely be entrusted with the duties and responsibilities of operating or navigating passenger carrying vessels of the tonnage and upon the waters specified. The state licensed captains command vessels that range from small uninspected vessels to large excursion vessels that carry over 100 passengers, so the licenses are not issued haphazardly. For example, see Washington State's Certification of Charter Boats and Operators licenses.

== See also ==
- Honourable Company of Master Mariners
- Maritime pilot
- Sea captain
- Senior captain
- Shipping master
