= MV Murree =

Coordinates: 49°57′30″N 3°14′5″W

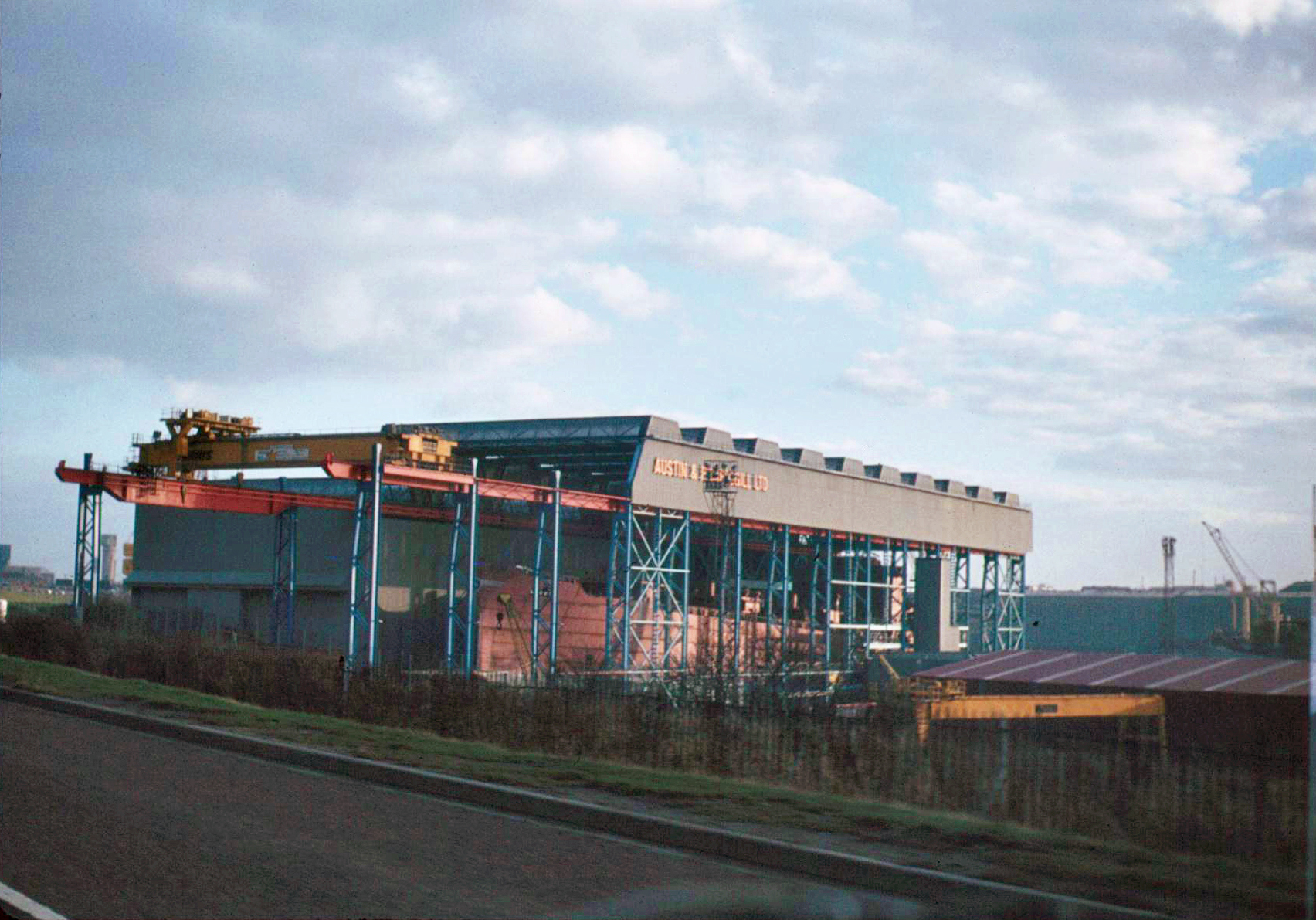
- The Murree in Austin & Pickersgill's shipyard on the day of its launch

History

Pakistan
- Name: Murree
- Namesake: Murree
- Owner: Pakistan National Shipping Corporation
- Operator: Pakistan National Shipping Corporation
- Port of registry: Karachi, Pakistan
- Builder: Austin & Pickersgill
- Yard number: 1407
- Launched: 5 December 1981
- Completed: 22 April 1981
- Out of service: 28 October 1989
- Identification: IMO number: 8000161
- Fate: Wrecked

General characteristics
- Class & type: SD18
- Type: Dry cargo and container
- Tonnage: 11,940 GRT; 18,050 DWT
- Length: 145.0 metres
- Beam: 22.8 metres
- Draught: 9.5 metres
- Depth: 13.1 metres
- Installed power: 10,400 bhp
- Propulsion: Diesel
- Speed: 15.75 knots

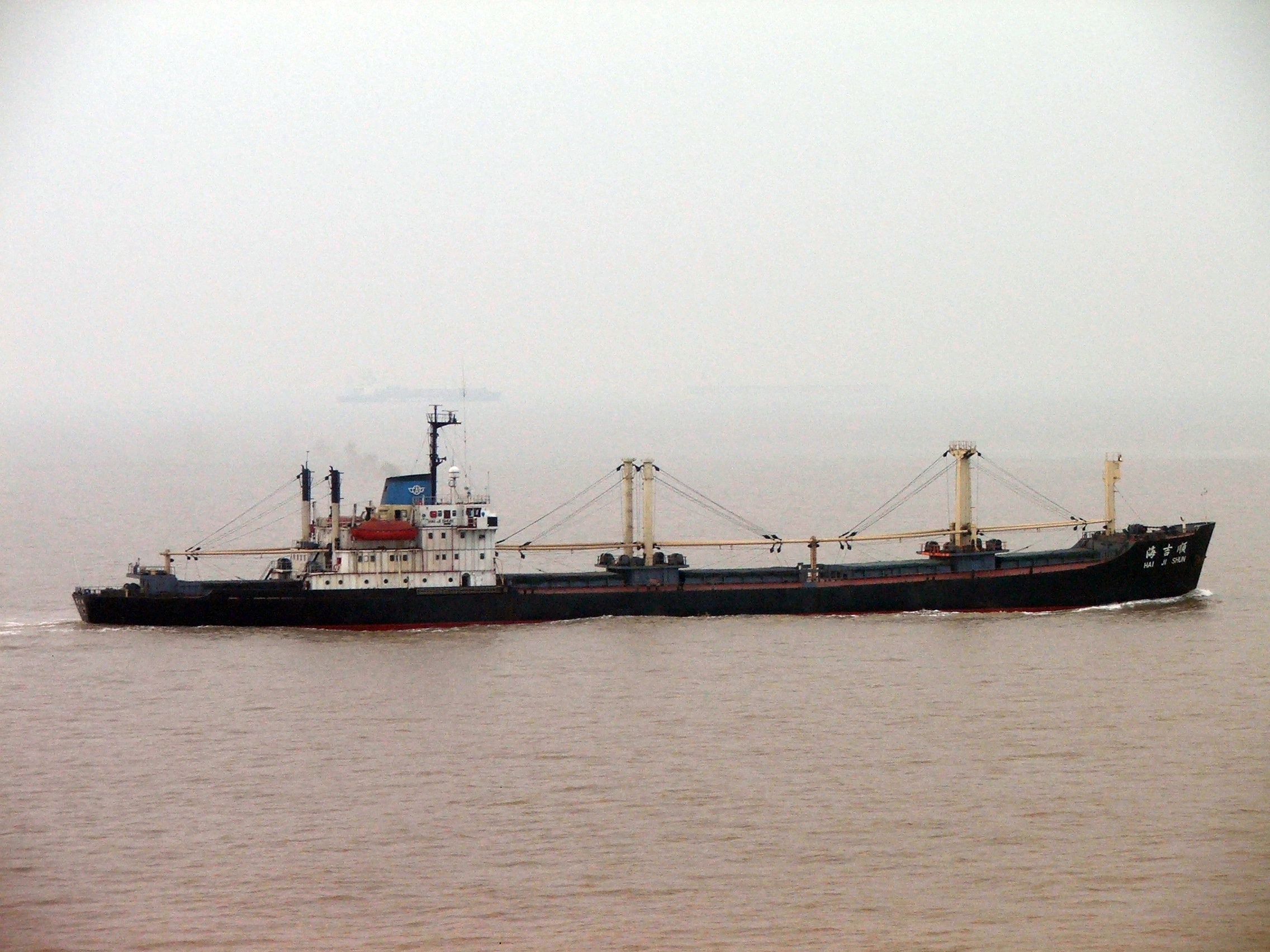
A Chinese owned SD14 in service.

The MV Murree was a 1981 ship of the SD18 type, which sank in the English Channel in 1989.

== Development ==
The SD14 (Shelter Deck 14) type was the successor class of Liberty Ships developed by the Austin & Pickersgill's shipyard on the River Wear in Sunderland. 211 SD14 vessels were built. The MV Murree was one of three SD18 vessels - a larger and more advanced type based on the SD14 - built at Austin & Pickersgill's Southwick yard. While the shipyard is closed today, the company line is now a member of the A&P Group.

== Career ==
Her working life was spent exclusively with the Pakistan National Shipping Corporation. The name Murree connected the ship with an important Pakistani hill station.

== Sinking ==
The MV Murree sank in a force 10 storm 22 miles south east of Start Point on 28 October 1989 after deck containers were dislodged and damaged the hull. Royal Navy search and rescue Sea King helicopters, of 771 Naval Air Squadron and 772 Naval Air Squadron flying from RNAS Culdrose and RNAS Portland near Helston Cornwall and Portland Dorset respectively, made a brave and difficult rescue of the 40 crew and passengers. Film of the rescue appeared in the BBC television series 999. The subject was covered again by the BBC in 2013 in a John Sergeant documentary about the Westland Sea King Helicopter.

The wreck has subsequently become an attraction for sport divers.
