= SD18 (ship type) =

Class overview
- Builders: Austin & Pickersgill
- Operators: Pakistan National Shipping Corporation
- Preceded by: SD14
- Built: 1980–1981
- Completed: 3
- Active: 0
- Lost: 1
- Scrapped: 2

General characteristics
- Type: Cargo ship
- Tonnage: 11,960 GRT, 7,900 NRT
- Length: 152.03 m (498.8 ft) LOA; 145.01 m (475.8 ft) Lpp
- Beam: 22.86 m (75.0 ft)
- Draft: 9.45 m (31.0 ft)
- Depth: 13.11 m (43.0 ft)
- Installed power: Sulzer RND68M diesel engine 8,385 kW (11,244 hp)
- Propulsion: Single screw
- Speed: 15.75 knots (29.17 km/h; 18.12 mph)
- Capacity: 24,345 m^{3} (859,700 cu ft)

SD18 (sometimes written SD-18 or SD 18) is the designation of a type of cargo ship, built by Austin & Pickersgill at their yard in Southwick, Sunderland, England in 1980–1981. Only three were built: Murree, Kaghan and Ayubia. The name SD18 stands for "shelter decker, 18,000 tons".

== Description ==
In 1980–1981, Austin & Pickersgill shipyard in Sunderland built three cargo ships of type SD18 for the Pakistan National Shipping Corporation of Karachi. The type of ship was a development of the highly successful Liberty ship replacement, type SD14. In the light of changing market conditions in the wake of the global containerization, the shipyard was unable to sell any further ships of this type. All three ships spent their entire periods of service with the Pakistan National Shipping Corporation.

Murree sank in 1989 in a force 10 gale in the English Channel, the other two ships, Ayubia and Kaghan were scrapped at Gadani Beach in 2001 and 2004 respectively.

SD18 ships had aft superstructure and machinery, and four cargo holds with a capacity totalling 24,345 cubic metres (859,700 cu ft) grain (i.e. loose material). The most forward cargo hold had a hatch with McGregor single-pull hatch covers, the other three cargo holds had double hatches, which were also sealed with McGregor single-pull hatch covers.

Their cargo-handling gear comprised six derricks, two of 35t and four of 25t.

Power was produced by a single Sulzer RND68M two-stroke diesel engine, made under licence by Clark Hawthorn. The engine was directly coupled to the fixed pitch propeller and had an output of 8,385 kW (11,244 hp) MCR, propelling the ship at a speed of 15.75 knots (29.17 km/h; 18.12 mph). At the end of the 1980s Ayubia's main engine was replaced with a new engine of the same design built by Hitachi Zosen. The onboard electricity was produced by three auxiliary diesel engines, each producing 450 kVA.

== List of SD18 type ships ==
SD18-type ships
Name	Yard number	IMO Number	Delivered	Whereabouts
Murree	1407	8000161	April 1981	Sank on 28 October 1989 during bad weather in the English Channel, 22 nautical miles (41 km; 25 mi) southeast of Start Point
Kaghan	1408	8000173	July 1981	Scrapped on 20 January 2004 at Gadani Beach, Pakistan.
Ayubia	1409	8000185	1981	Scrapped in October 2001 at Gadani Beach, Pakistan.

== Bibliography ==
- Scott, Robert (1984). Standard Ship Designs: Dry cargo, container and ro-ro vessels. London: Fairplay Publications. ISBN 0-905045-54-8.
