= Gwadar Port =

Deep-water seaport in Balochistan, Pakistan

Gwadar Port گوادر بندرگاہ
- Interactive map of Gwadar Port گوادر بندرگاہ
- Location within Pakistan

Location
- Country: Pakistan
- Location: Gwadar, Balochistan
- Coordinates: 25.1105°N 62.3396°E
- UN/LOCODE: PK GWD

Details
- Built: Phase I: (2002–2030) 12.5 meters (41 feet) max draft (hull) of channels Phase II: (2030–2037) 20.5 m (67 ft) max draft of channels Phase III: (2037–2045) 24.5 m (80 ft) max draft of channels
- Opened: 2002; 24 years ago
- Operated by: Gwadar Port Authority; Maritime Secretary of Pakistan; China Overseas Port Holding Company (2016–present)
- Owned by: Gwadar Port Authority
- Size: 2,292-acre Free Trade Area
- No. of berths: Current: 4 Phase I: 50 by 2030; Phase II: 100 by 2037; Phase III: 150 by 2045
- Ship types: Phase I (Current): Bulk carriers of 30,000 Deadweight tonnage (DWT), and container Panamax vessels of 52,000 (DWT); Phase II (Proposed): 200,000 (DWT) Neopanamax vessels Phase III (Proposed): 400,000+ (DWT) Chinamax (Valemax) vessels, and TI-class supertanker
- Rail lines: Khunjerab Railway (Proposed)
- Rail gauge: 5 ft 6 in gauge railway (1676 mm) (Proposed)
- Truck types: Tank truck Karakoram Highway (OBOR) (CPEC)

Statistics
- Website gwadarport.gov.pk

Gwadar Port (Urdu: گوادر بندرگاہ [ˈɡwaːdəɾ ˈbəndəɾɡaː]) is a deep-sea port situated on the Arabian Sea at Gwadar in Pakistan's Balochistan province. The port is under the administrative control of the Maritime Secretary of Pakistan and the operational control of the China Overseas Port Holding Company. The port features prominently in the China–Pakistan Economic Corridor (CPEC) and is considered to be a link between the Belt and Road Initiative and the Maritime Silk Road projects. It is about 120 kilometres (75 mi) southwest of Turbat, and 170 kilometres (110 mi) to the east of Chabahar Port (Sistan and Balochistan Province in Iran).

The potential of Gwadar to serve as a deep-water port was first identified in 1954, when the city was still under Omani rule. Plans for construction of the port were not realised until 2007, when the port was inaugurated by Pervez Musharraf after four years of construction, at a cost of $248 million.

In 2015, it was announced that the city and port would be further developed under CPEC at a cost of $1.62 billion, with the aim of linking northern Pakistan and western China to the deep water seaport. The port will also be the site of a floating liquefied natural gas facility that will be built as part of the larger $2.5 billion Gwadar-Nawabshah segment of the Iran–Pakistan gas pipeline project. Construction began in June 2016 on the Gwadar Special Economic Zone, which is being built on 927.5 ha (2,292-acre) adjacent to Gwadar's port. In late 2015, around 809.3 ha (2,000 acres) of land were leased to a Chinese company for 43 years for the development of Gwadar Special Economy Zone.

Gwadar Port became formally operational on 14 November 2016, when it was inaugurated by Pakistan's Prime Minister Muhammad Nawaz Sharif; the first convoy was seen off by the then Pakistan's Chief of Army Staff, General Raheel Sharif. On 14 January 2020, Pakistan operationalized Gwadar Port for Afghan transit trade. On 31 May 2021, Gwadar Port became fully operational, along with the availability of online booking for the delivery of goods.

== Location ==
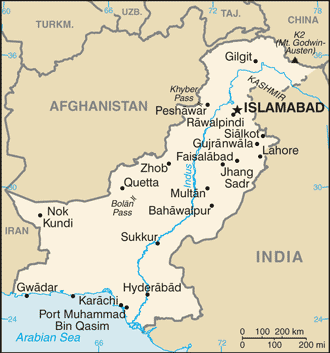
Gwadar Port is located in southwestern Pakistan near the Iranian border.

Gwadar Port is situated on the shores of the Arabian Sea in the city of Gwadar, located in the Pakistani province of Balochistan. The port is located 533 km from Pakistan's largest city, Karachi, and is approximately 120 km from the Iranian border. It is located 380 km (240 mi) away from Oman, and near key oil shipping lanes from the Persian Gulf. The greater surrounding region is home to around two-thirds of the world's proven oil reserves. It is also the nearest warm-water seaport to the landlocked, but hydrocarbon rich, Central Asian Republics, as well as Afghanistan.

The port is situated on a rocky outcropping in the Arabian sea that forms part of a natural hammerhead-shaped peninsula protruding out from the Pakistani coastline. The peninsula, known as the Gwadar Promontory, consists of rocky outcropping reaching an altitude of 560 feet with a width of 2.5 miles that are connected to the Pakistani shore by a narrow and sandy 12 kilometre long isthmus. The isthmus separates the shallow Padi Zirr bay to the west, from the deep water Demi Zirr harbour in the east.

Gwadar Port has significant advantages compared to other ports in the region due to its depth, natural breakwater, and desert climate with little seasonal variation.

== History ==
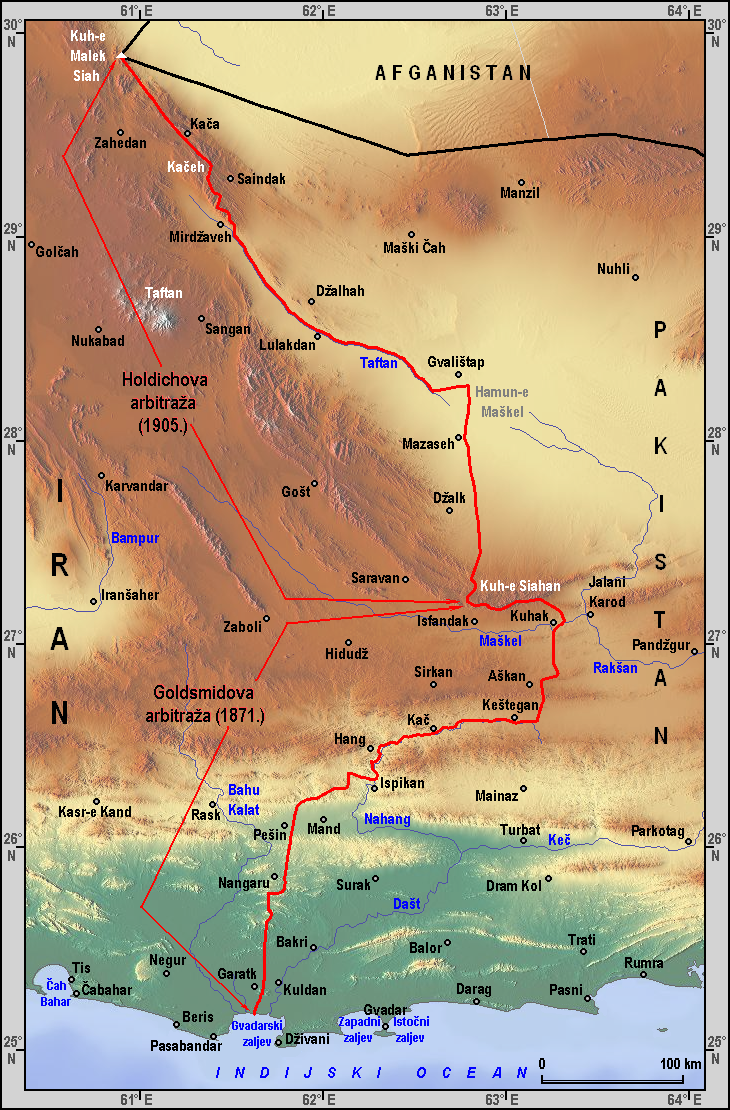
Gwadar near the Iran–Pakistan border

In 1783, the Khan of Kalat, Mir Noori Naseer Khan Baloch, granted Gwadar to Taimur Sultan, the vanquished leader of Muscat, who was entrusted with its governance on behalf of the Khan. Despite Taimur Sultan's eventual recovery of power in Muscat, the Omani administration continued to hold sway over Gwadar through the appointment of local governors.

In 1797, Saiad Sultan assumed the leadership of Muscat, but he did not relinquish control of the Gwadar enclave to Kalat. This resulted in a dispute between the Sultan's descendants and the Khan of Kalat regarding the governance of Gwadar, which led to British involvement in the matter. Eventually, the British brought telegraph lines to the town. Having secured concessions from the Sultan for the utilization of the region, the British assisted Muscat in maintaining control over Gwadar.

In the 1950s, Oman offered to sell the port to India, which was declined by then Prime Minister Jawaharlal Nehru, likely because India lacked the ability to effectively defend the enclave from Pakistan.

At the time of Pakistan's independence in 1947, Gwadar remained under Omani authority. Nevertheless, Pakistan started to indicate interest in Gwadar after it acquired control of various Baloch territories, including the Chief Commissioner's Province of British Baluchistan, as well as the states of Kharan, Makran, Lasbela and Kalat. Over the months following independence, Pakistan absorbed these regions into its territory. In 1954, Pakistan engaged the United States Geological Survey (USGS) to conduct a survey of its coastline. The USGS deputed the surveyor, Worth Condrick, for the survey, who identified Gwadar as a suitable site for a seaport. After four years of negotiations, Pakistan purchased the Gwadar enclave from Oman for £3 million on 8 September 1958 (equivalent to £81.4 million in 2024) and Gwadar officially became part of Pakistan on 8 December 1958, after 200 years of Omani rule.

In the 1970s, Pakistan sought financial support from both the United States and the Soviet Union to develop a naval base at Gwadar, but both countries declined the request.

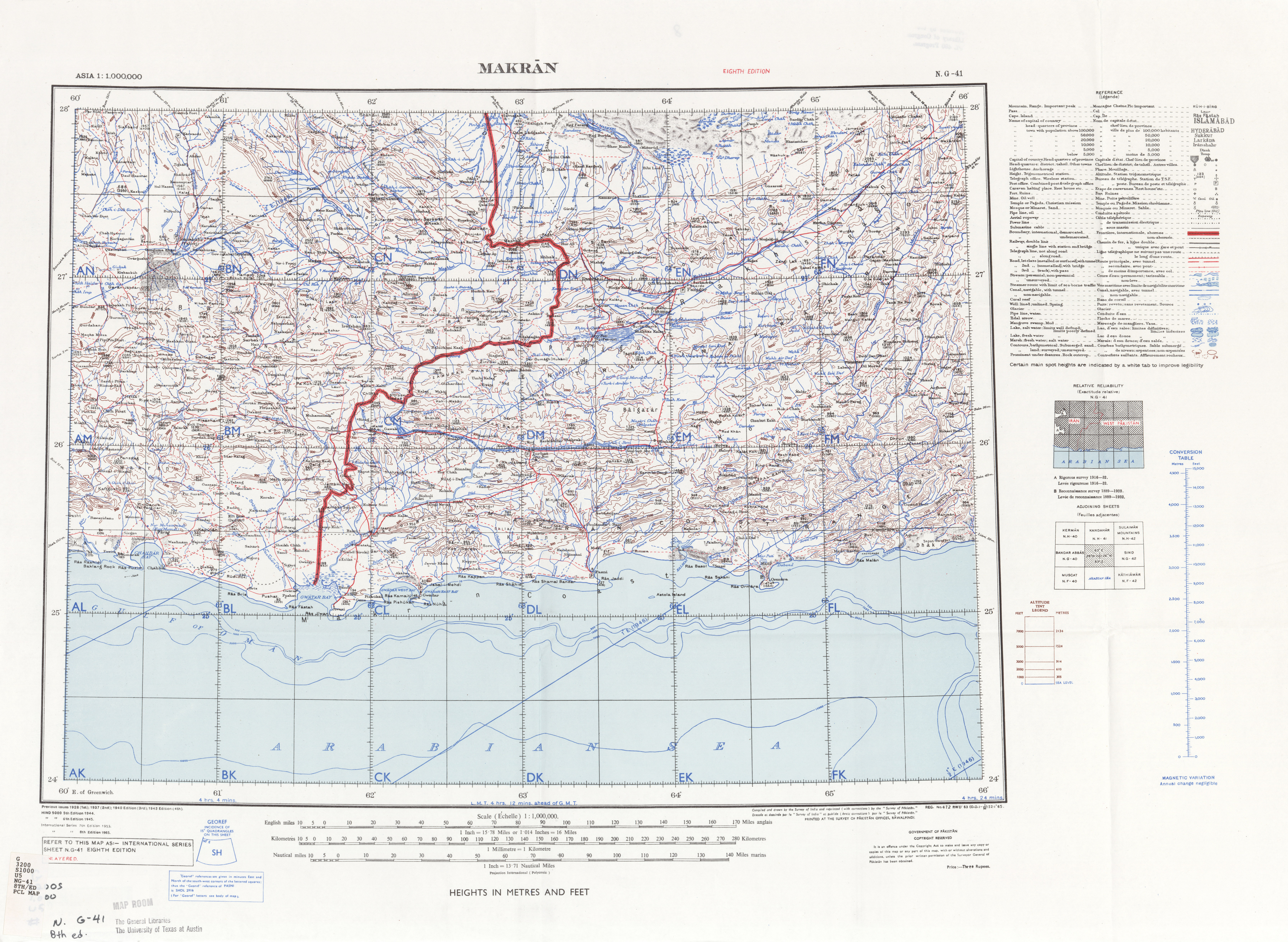
Map including Gwadar (SoP, 1965)

A small wharf at Gwadar was completed in 1992, and formal proposals for a deep sea port at Gwadar were unveiled a year later in 1993. The federal government approved the construction of the port in December 1995 but the project could not get started because of shortage of funds. In 1997, a government-appointed task force identified Gwadar as one of the focus area of development, but the project did not launch due to economic sanctions imposed against Pakistan following its nuclear tests in May 1998. Construction on Phase 1 of the project began in 2002 after the agreement for its construction was signed during the state visit of Chinese Premier Zhu Rongji in 2001. After completion of Phase 1 in 2007, the first commercial cargo vessel to dock at the port was the POS Glory, with 70,000 Metric Tonnes of Wheat on 15 March 2008.

The port is part of the 21st Century Maritime Silk Road that runs from the Chinese coast through the Strait of Malacca, to Mombasa, from there via the Suez Canal to the Mediterranean, there to the Upper Adriatic region with its rail connections to Central Europe and the North Sea.

In 2019, the Baloch Liberation Army, which opposes the Gwadar Port City, targeted Chinese nationals in an attack on the Pearl-Continental Hotel.

== Construction ==
Gwadar Port is being developed in two phases: Phase I covered building of three multipurpose berths and related port infrastructure and port handling equipment, and was completed in December 2006, but inaugurated on 20 March 2007.

=== Phase I (2001–2006) ===
The first phase of construction at Gwadar Port began in 2002, and was completed in 2006, before inauguration in 2007.

- Berths: 3 Multipurpose Berths
- Length of Berths: 602 m in total
- Approach Channel: 4.5 km long dredged to 12.5 m depth and max draft (hull) of channel.(capacity: bulk carriers of 30,000 deadweight tonnage [DWT] and container vessels of 25,000 DWT)
- Turning basin: 450 m diameter
- Service Berth: One 100 m Service Berth
- Related port infrastructure and handling equipment, pilot boats, tugs, survey vessels, etc.
- Built at a cost of $248 million.

=== Phase II ===
The second phase of construction is currently underway as part of planned improvements under CPEC and other ancillary projects. The total project is expected to cost $1.02 billion. In Sep 2018, the Pakistan Senate expressed concern at slow rate of progress of most projects of Phase II at Gwadar as construction had not started for most projects.

Completed:

- 6-lane Gwadar Eastbay Expressway to connect the port to the Makran Coastal Highway
- New Gwadar International Airport, built in the vicinity of Gwadar
- 1 Ro-Ro Terminal

Ongoing:

- Approach Channel: To be dredged to 14.5 m depth and max draft (hull) of channel
- Desalination plant
- Gwadar Coal–Power Plant – 300 megawatt coal-fired power plant

Planned:

- 4 Container Berths along 3.2 kilometres of shoreline
- 1 Bulk Cargo Terminal (capacity: 100,000 DWT ships)
- 1 Grain Terminal
- 2 oil terminals (capacity: 200,000 DWT ships each)
- Floating liquefied natural gas terminal with capacity of 500 million cubic feet of gas per day
- 927.5 ha (2,292-acre) special economic zone to be developed adjacent to port

=== Longer term plans ===
- Dredging of approach channel to depth of 20 meters
- 100 berths to be built by 2045
- Capacity to handle 400 million tons of cargo per year

== Expansion under CPEC ==
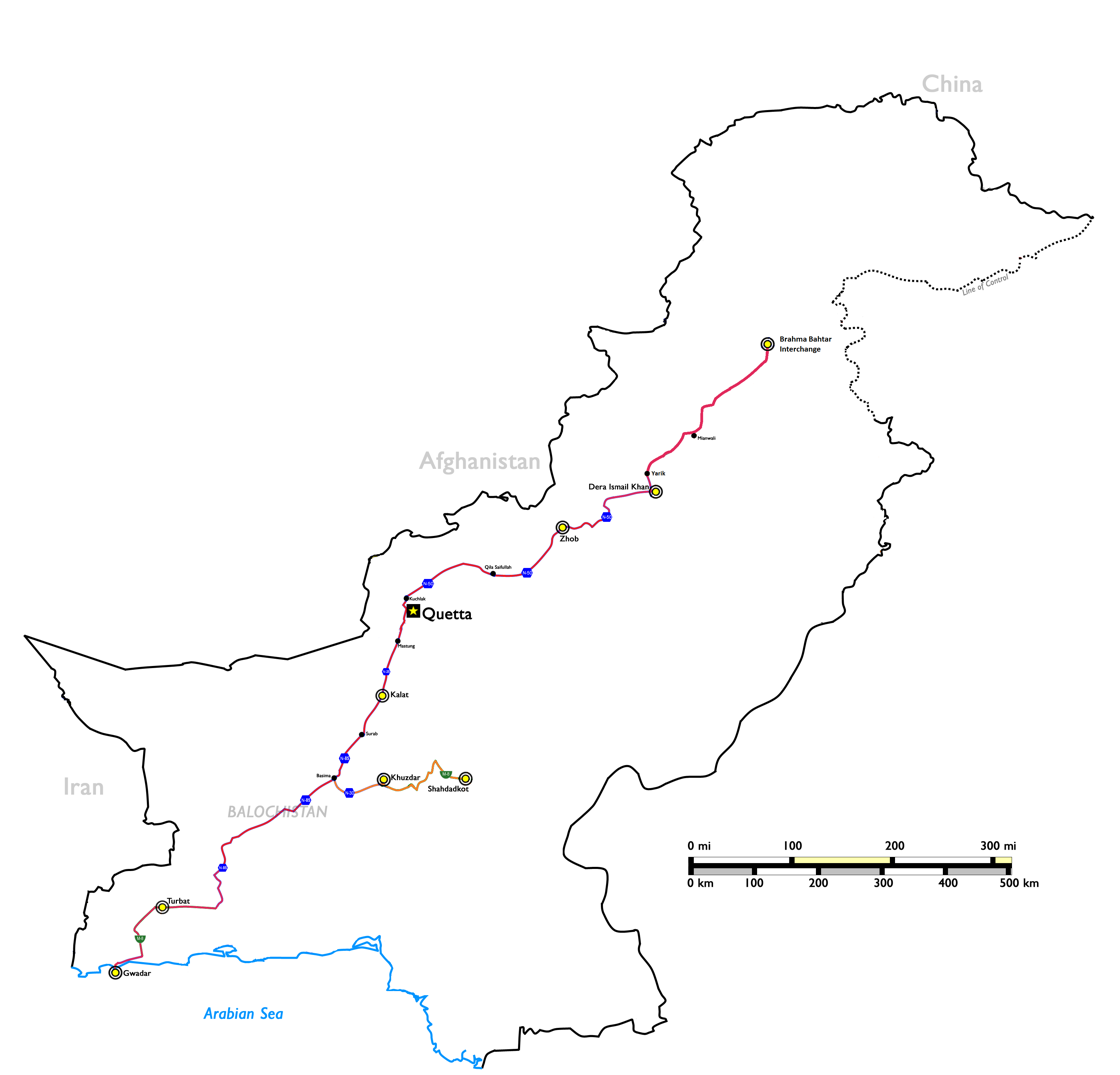
The Western Alignment of CPEC is depicted by the red line. The 1,153 kilometre route will link the M1 Motorway near Islamabad with Gwadar Port. The Western Alignment will also connect to the Karakoram Highway, which is being rebuilt and overhauled as part of CPEC to provide improved access to Gilgit Baltistan and the Chinese region of Xinjiang.

Under the China-Pakistan Economic Corridor plan, the state-owned China Overseas Port Holding Company (COPHC) will expand Gwadar Port with construction of nine new multipurpose berths on 3.2 kilometres of seafront to the east of the existing multipurpose berths. COPHC will also build cargo terminals in the 12 kilometres of land to the north and northwest of the site along the shoreline of the Demi Zirr bay.

In total, COPHC has awarded $1.02 billion worth of contracts for expansion of the port. In addition to construction of nine berths and cargo terminals, plans for expanded port infrastructure also include several projects that will be financed by loans extended by Chinese state owned banks. The Gwadar Port dredging project will deepen approach channels to a depth of 14 meters from the current 11.5-meter depth, at a cost of $27 million. Dredging will enable docking of larger ships with a deadweight tonnage of up to 70,000 at Gwadar Port, while current capacity permits a maximum 20,000 DWT. Future plans call for dredging of the harbour to a depth of 20 meters to allow for docking of larger vessels. Also included as part of the CPEC infrastructure development package for port infrastructure is a $130 million breakwater around the port.

Ancillary infrastructure projects for the port will also be built as part of CPEC. A $114 million desalination plant will be developed to provide potable water to the city, while the Government of Pakistan will also contribute $35 million towards infrastructure projects in the Gwadar Special Economic Zone. A 19 kilometre-long dual carriageway known as the Gwadar East Bay Expressway will also be built at a cost of $140 million to connect Gwadar Port to the existing Makran Coastal Highway and the planned $230 million Gwadar International Airport.

A floating liquefied natural gas facility that will have a capacity of 500 million cubic feet of liquified natural gas per day will also be built at the port as part of the $2.5 billion Gwadar-Nawabshah segment of the Iran–Pakistan gas pipeline, which is being built as a joint venture between Pakistan's Inter State Gas System, and the China National Petroleum Corporation. The Pakistani government also intends to establish a training institute named Pak-China Technical and Vocational Institute at Gwadar which is to be completed at the cost of 943 million rupees to impart skills to local residents to train them to operate machinery at the port.

It was expected that by 2017, the port will handle over one million tons of cargo, most of which will consist of construction materials for other CPEC projects. However, the project has faced multiple challenges. The Pakistan government has curbed expansion of mega project due to mounting debt on country's exchequer. The COVID-19 pandemic has further impacted the work on the project. COPHC plans to eventually expand the port's capacity to 400 million tons of cargo per year. Long terms plans for Gwadar Port call for a total of 100 berths to be built by 2045.

In September 2018 the Ministry of Maritime of Pakistan submitted a report in Senate that during the last five years, 99 ships loaded with cargo from seven different countries anchored at Gwadar Port. The weight of shipments was 1.439 million tons.

=== Financing ===
The government of China in August 2015 announced that the previously announced concessionary loans for several projects in Gwadar totalling $757 million would be converted 0% interest loans for which Pakistan will only be required to repay the principal value. The projects which are now to financed by the 0% interest loans include: the construction of the $140 million East Bay Expressway project, installation of breakwaters in Gwadar which will cost $130 million, a $360 million coal power plant in Gwadar, a $27 million project to dredge berths in Gwadar harbour, and a $100 million 300-bed hospital in Gwadar.

In September 2015, the government of China also announced that the $230 million Gwadar International Airport project would no longer be financed by loans, but would instead be constructed by grants which the government of Pakistan will not be required to repay.

== Gwadar Special Economic Zone ==
The expanded port will be located near a 2,282-acre free trade area in Gwadar which is being modelled on the lines of the Special Economic Zones of China. The 2000 acre of land was leased to Chinese Company in November 2015 for the construction of Gwadar Economic Zone., while construction of the project began on 20 June 2016. The special economic zone is expected to employ approximately 40,000 people, with possibility for future expansion.

The special economic zone will include manufacturing zones, logistics hubs, warehouses, and display centres. Business established in the special economic zone will be exempt from Pakistani income, sales, and federal excise taxes for 23 years. Contractors and subcontractors associated with China Overseas Port Holding Company will be exempt from such taxes for 20 years, while a 40-year tax holiday will be granted for imports of equipment, materials, plants, machinery, appliances and accessories that are to be for construction of Gwadar Port and special economic zone.

The special economic zone will be completed in three phases. By 2025, it is envisaged that manufacturing and processing industries will be developed, while further expansion of the zone is intended to be complete by 2030. On 10 April 2016, talking to The Washington Post, Zhang Baozhong, chairman of China Overseas Port Holding Company said that his company could spend a total of $4.5 billion on roads, power, hotels and other infrastructure for the industrial zone, which he said would be open to non-Chinese companies. The company also plans to build an international airport and power plant for Gwadar.

Saudi Arabia has promised to build US$10 billion oil refinery at Gwadar Port in 2019.

Pakistan expressed its desire for China to include additional projects within the framework of the China-Pakistan Economic Corridor (CPEC), encompassing areas such as energy, climate change, electricity transmission, and tourism. However, Beijing displayed limited interest in this request. Furthermore, Beijing declined Islamabad's proposal to construct a 500-kilovolt transmission line from Gwadar port to the national electricity grid in Karachi.

== Operations ==
Gwadar Port is owned by the government-owned Gwadar Port Authority and operated by China Overseas Port Holding Company (COPHC), a state-run Chinese firm. Prior to COPHC, the port was operated by the Port of Singapore Authority.

=== Port of Singapore Authority (2007–2013) ===
Following the completion of Phase I, the Government of Pakistan in February 2007 signed a 40-year agreement with PSA International for development and operation of the port, and an adjacent 584-acre special economic zone. PSA International was the highest bidder for the Gwadar Port, after its competitor DP World withdrew from the bidding process. PSA was granted a wide range of tax concessions, including exemption from corporate tax for 20 years, land for a special economic zone, duty-free imports of materials and equipment for construction and operations of the port, and duty-free shipping and bunker oil for 40 years. In addition to these incentives, the provincial government of Balochistan was also asked to exempt PSA International from the levy of provincial and district taxes. According to the agreement with PSA, the Government of Pakistan was to get a fixed 9% share of the revenue from cargo and maritime services, in addition to 15% of revenues earned from the adjacent special economic zone.

In September 2011, The Wall Street Journal reported that Gwadar was being underused as commercial port, and that Pakistan had asked the Chinese government to assume operations of the port. PSA also reportedly sought to withdraw from its contract with the Pakistani Government, and expressed willingness to sell its share in the project to a Chinese firm after the Pakistani Navy failed to transfer land required for development of the planned 584-acre free trade zone. PSA also did not invest the agreed $550 million into the port, on account of the poor security situation in Balochistan in the period between 2007 and 2013. The government of Pakistan also failed to invest in requisite infrastructure works. The Supreme Court of Pakistan further issued a stay order against the allotment of land to PSA on account of a public petition.

=== China Overseas Port Holding Company (2013–present) ===
On 18 February 2013, Pakistan awarded a contract for construction and operation of Gwadar Port to a Chinese state-owned enterprise. As per details of the contract, the port would remain as property of Pakistan, but would be operated by the state-run Chinese firm – China Overseas Port Holding Company (COPHC). The contract signing ceremony was held on 18 February 2013 in Islamabad, and was attended by Pakistani President Asif Ali Zardari, Chinese Ambassador Liu Jian, as well as various federal ministers and members of parliament, as well as senior government officials. The ceremony was also marked the transfer of the concession agreement from the PSA to the COPHC.

As per this agreement, 91% of the revenue generated by Gwadar Port will go to COPHC and 9% to Gwadar Port Authority. In March 2019, the Pakistani Senate was informed that during last three years, total gross revenue of Rs 358.151 million had been generated from Gwadar Port, out of which the share going to Gwadar Port Authority was Rs 32.324 million.

Throughout the entire year of 2025, the port handled 8,300 TEUs of cargo. The poor activity was attributed to a lack of supporting infrastructure linking the port to the rest of Pakistan's transport network. This activity began to increase in 2026, with cargo activity in the month of April 2026 reaching 11,000 TEUs due to cargo diversions in reaction to the 2026 Iran war.

== Geopolitical impact ==
=== Gwadar Port as a means to circumvent the Straits of Malacca ===
The Straits of Malacca provide China with its shortest maritime access to Europe, Africa, and the Middle East. Approximately 80% of its Middle Eastern and African energy imports also pass through the Straits of Malacca. As the world's biggest oil importer, energy security is a key concern for China while current sea routes used to import Middle Eastern and African oil are frequently patrolled by the United States Navy. The sea-route via the Straits of Malacca is roughly 12,000 kilometres (7,500 mi), while the distance from Gwadar Port to Xinjiang province is approximately 3,000 kilometres (1,900 mi), and another 3,500 kilometres (2,200 mi) from Xinjiang to China's eastern coast. However, the cost of moving oil overland is far greater. An oil pipeline from Gwadar to China's population centers (not yet built), will cost up to $8/barrel, while the cost of shipping oil from the Persian Gulf to China is $2–3/barrel.

In the event that China were to face hostile actions from a state or non-state actor, energy imports through the Straits of Malacca could be halted, which in turn would paralyse the Chinese economy in a scenario that is frequently referred to as the "Malacca dilemma". In addition to vulnerabilities it faces in the Straits of Malacca region, China is heavily dependent upon sea-routes that pass through the South China Sea, near the disputed Spratly Islands and Paracel Islands, which are currently a source of tension between China, Taiwan, Vietnam, the Philippines, and the United States. (Note: See South China Sea dispute for more context.) The CPEC project will allow Chinese energy imports to circumvent these contentious areas. The Sino-Myanmar pipelines have also been constructed by China to address this so-called "Malacca dilemma".

China's stake in Gwadar will also allow it to expand its influence in the Indian Ocean, a vital route for oil transportation between the Atlantic and the Pacific. Another advantage to China is that it will be able to bypass the Strait of Malacca. As of now, 60 percent of China's imported oil comes from the Middle East, and 80 percent of that is transported to China through this strait, the dangerous, piracy-rife maritime route through the South China, East China, and Yellow Seas.

— Council on Foreign Relations

=== Military use ===
Pakistan reportedly gave China private assurances that it could convert the Gwadar deep-water port into a permanent military facility. Classified Pakistani military documents reviewed by Drop Site News indicated that Pakistan sought in return Chinese guarantees against US retaliation, military modernization support against India, and a sea-based nuclear second-strike capability. China reportedly rejected the second-strike capability, citing nonproliferation commitments which, if failed, would lead to international consequences disproportionate to the strategic value of the Gwadar facility. The negotiations failed.

=== Improved access to western China ===
Planned investments in Gwadar Port as part of CPEC will improve connectivity to the restive Xinjiang Uyghur Autonomous Region, thereby increasing the region's potential to attract public and private investment. The CPEC is considered central to China–Pakistan relations; its central importance is reflected by China's inclusion of the project as part of its 13th five-year development plan. The Gwadar Port project will also complement China's Western Development plan, which includes not only Xinjiang, but also the neighbouring regions of Tibet and Qinghai.

In addition to its significance to reduce Chinese dependence on the Sea of Malacca and South China Sea routes, the port of Gwadar will provide China an alternative and shorter route for energy imports from the Middle East, thereby reducing shipping costs and transit times. The currently available sea-route to China is roughly 12,000 kilometres (7,500 mi), while the distance from Gwadar Port to Xinjiang is approximately 3,000 kilometres (1,900 mi), and another 3,500 kilometres (2,200 mi) from Xinjiang to China's eastern coast. As a result of the CPEC, Chinese imports and exports to the Middle East, Africa, and Europe would require much shorter shipment times and distances. The Chinese share of revenue generated from Gwadar Port would be 91% of the share.

=== A new transit hub for the Central Asian Republics ===
Upon completion of CPEC-related infrastructure projects, transit times between Kashgar, China and Pakistan's Gwadar Port will be greatly reduced. This will in turn will also reduce transit times to the Kyrgyzstan and hydrocarbon-rich Kazakhstan through already existing overland routes. The Chinese government has already upgraded the road linking Kashgar to Osh, Kyrgyzstan via the Kyrgyz town of Erkeshtam while a railway between Ürümqi, China and Almaty, Kazakhstan has also been completed as part of China's One Belt One Road initiative. Numerous land crossings already exist between Kazakhstan and China as well. Additionally, the Chinese government has announced plans to lay railway track from Tashkent, Uzbekistan towards Kyrgyzstan with onwards connections to China and Pakistan's coast.

The heads of various Central Asian republics have expressed their desire to connect their infrastructure networks to the CPEC project and Gwadar Port via China. During the August 2015 visit of Pakistani Prime Minister Nawaz Sharif to Kazakhstan, the Kazakh Prime Minister Karim Massimov, conveyed Kazakhstan's desire to link its road network to the CPEC project, which will also provide Kazakhstan with access to the port.

During the November 2015 visit of Tajikistan's President Emomali Rahmon to Pakistan, the Tajik premier also expressed his government's desire to join the Quadrilateral Agreement on Traffic in Transit to use CPEC and Gwadar Port as a conduit for imports and exports to Tajikistan by circumventing Afghanistan. The request received political backing by the Pakistani Prime Minister. The Pamir Highway in Central Asia already provides Tajikistan access to Kashgar via the Kulma Pass. These crossings complement the CPEC project to provide Central Asian states access to Pakistan's seaports in Gwadar and Karachi by completely bypassing Afghanistan – a country which has been ravaged by civil war and political instability since the late 1970s.

=== Comparison to Chabahar Port projects ===
In May 2016, Indian Prime Minister Narendra Modi and his Iranian counterpart President Hassan Rouhani signed a series of twelve agreements in Tehran in a boon to India–Iran relations. By these agreements, India Ports Global Pvt. Limited will refurbish a 640-meter long container handling facility, and reconstruct a 600-meter long berth at the Port of Chabahar, as well as modernise ancillary infrastructure at the berths. Improvements at the port are intended to allow Indian goods to be exported to Iran, with the possibility of onward connections to Afghanistan and Central Asia. A section of the Indian media described it as "a counter to the China-Pakistan Economic Corridor", although the total monetary value of projects has been noted to be significantly less than that of US$46 billion CPEC project, evaluated at worth about $500 million.

==== Indian financial commitments in Chabahar ====
As part of the twelve memoranda of understanding signed by Indian and Iranian delegations as per text released by India's Ministry of External Affairs, India Ports Global signed a contract with Iran's Arya Banader to refurbish and reconstruct two existing berths at the port, at a cost of $85 million over the course of 18 months. The berth project represents the only direct investment in port infrastructure mentioned in the May 2016 agreements. Chabahar was developed in 1972 as the oceanic port in Iran, and already features ten berths as of 2016, with a capacity to dock vessels of 80,000 deadweight tonnage.

As part of the agreements, India will also offer a $150 million line of credit extended by the Exim Bank of India for future port development, India further agreed to extend a $400 million line of credit to be used for the import of steel for the construction of a rail link between Chabahar and Zahedan, while India's IRCON and Iran's CDTIC signed a memorandum of understanding for the possible construction and financing of the Chabahar to Zahedan rail line at a cost of $1.6 billion.

==== Chinese financial commitments in Gwadar ====
As part of CPEC, China has instead has committed $1.153 billion to finance construction projects and development of the port and adjacent sites. Chinese commitments in Gwadar as part of the CPEC project include: the construction of the $140 million East Bay Expressway project to connect the port with the Makran Coastal Highway, installation of breakwaters at Gwadar port which will cost $130 million, a $360 million coal power plant adjacent to Gwadar Port, a $27 million project to dredge berths in Gwadar harbour, and a $100 million 300-bed hospital in Gwadar. A $114 million desalination plant will also be developed to provide potable water, while $35 million worth of infrastructure projects around the special economic zone will also be built. China will also grant Pakistan $230 million to construct a new international airport in Gwadar which opened in 2024. A floating liquefied natural gas facility will also be built at Gwadar Port as part of the $2.5 billion Gwadar-Nawabshah segment of the Iran–Pakistan gas pipeline.

In addition to investments directly under the aegis of CPEC, the China Overseas Port Holdings Company also initiated $2 billion worth of additional infrastructure projects at the adjacent Gwadar special economic zone on 20 June 2016. COPHC will also expand Gwadar Port with construction of multipurpose berths on 3.2 kilometres (2.0 mi) of seafront to the east of the existing multipurpose berths. COPHC will additionally build cargo terminals in the 12 kilometres (7.5 mi) of land to the north and northwest of the site along the shoreline of the Demi Zirr bay.

==== Iranian and Pakistani responses to Chabahar development plans ====
After signing the Chabahar agreement, Iran's ambassador to Pakistan, Mehdi Honerdoost, stated that the agreement was "not finished", and that Iran would welcome the inclusion of both Pakistan and China in the project. While clarifying that Chabahar Port would not be a rival or enemy to Pakistan's Gwadar Port, he further stated that Pakistan and China had both been invited to contribute to the project before India, but neither China nor Pakistan had expressed interest in joining.

Pakistani analysts have endorsed the view that Chabahar is not a competitor, stating that Gwadar has an advantage by being a deep sea port and the expansion of Chabahar would in fact expand trade through Gwadar. Larger vessels that cannot dock at Chabahar could dock at Gwadar and the cargo transshipped to Chabahar. However, Pakistan's military commentators have characterised the alliance between India, Iran, and the then American-backed Afghan government as a "security threat to Pakistan", and it had "ominous and far-reaching implications" to the region. Pakistan's foreign policy advisor Sartaj Aziz has further signalled that Pakistan may link the Gwadar port to Chabahar via rail.

=== Afghan transit trade ===
Pakistan business community agreed to utilise Gwadar Port for Afghan transit trade.

Gwadar faced protests and information censorship for many months due to sit-ins led by Maulana Hidayat-ur-Rehman. The port city was considered the "crown jewel" of the China-Pakistan Economic Corridor (CPEC) and China's Belt and Road Initiative (BRI). Despite being officially launched in 2002, the city faced protests and tension for the past year.

== Future environmental impact ==
Some have expressed concerns on the future of the environment of the region in light of the Gwadar port's expansion. A report of the LEAD Fellows' Study Group on the Oil Spill (SGOS) alleges that a port expansion would lead to future damage on the maritime environment such as oil spills and other human industrial waste pouring into the sea, also alleging that Pakistan's laws on maritime pollution have weak penalties and lack of institutional responsibility.

This sentiment was shared by Syed Fazl-E-Haider. In his publication in Pakistan and the Gulf Economist, Haider put forth the argument that the sea water on the Baloch coast was pollution free due to the lack of human presence and activity. But ever since the commence of commercial operations in the port, all this will result in environmental consequences.

In the jointly written book with Barbara E. Curry, Humpback Dolphins (Sousa spp.): Current Status and Conservation, Part 1 of Advances in Marine Biology, PhD marine biologist, Thomas A. Jefferson outlines some of the environmental consequences suffered by the Balochistan coast. He discusses the problem of sewage waste and solid waste affecting the coast including that of Gwadar. He argues that a thorough natural habitat assessment and regulation of fisheries is a solution to this growing environmental problem.

== Numismatics ==
Gwadar Port was featured on the back of the five Pakistani Rupee currency note, which is no longer in circulation.

== See also ==
- List of ports in Pakistan
- Foreign trade of Pakistan
- China–Pakistan Economic Corridor
- Port of Karachi
- Port Qasim
- String of Pearls (Indian Ocean)
