= The White List =

Countries implementing the STCW-95 convention

The White List is a list of countries assessed by the International Maritime Organization as properly implementing the STCW 1978 (as amended) convention.

Last list (as of 2024) was published by Maritime Safety Committee (MSC), at its 104th session (4 to 8 October 2021). It comprises 131 countries:

- Albania
- Algeria
- Antigua and Barbuda
- Argentina
- Australia
- Azerbaijan
- Bahamas (the)
- Bahrain
- Bangladesh
- Barbados
- Belgium
- Belize
- Bolivia (Plurinational State of)
- Brazil
- Brunei Darussalam
- Bulgaria
- Cabo Verde
- Cambodia
- Canada
- Chile
- China*
- Colombia
- Comoros (the)
- Cook Islands (the)
- Côte d'Ivoire
- Croatia
- Cuba
- Cyprus
- Czech Republic
- Democratic People's Republic of Korea
- Denmark**
- Dominica
- Ecuador
- Egypt
- El Salvador
- Eritrea
- Estonia
- Ethiopia
- Fiji
- Finland
- France
- Georgia
- Germany
- Ghana
- Greece
- Guatemala
- Honduras
- Hungary
- Iceland
- India
- Indonesia
- Iran (Islamic Republic of)
- Ireland
- Israel
- Italy
- Jamaica
- Japan
- Jordan
- Kazakhstan
- Kenya
- Kiribati
- Kuwait
- Latvia
- Lebanon
- Liberia
- Libya
- Lithuania
- Luxembourg
- Madagascar
- Malawi
- Malaysia
- Maldives
- Malta
- Marshall Islands
- Mauritania
- Mauritius
- Mexico
- Micronesia (Federated States of)
- Montenegro*****
- Morocco
- Mozambique
- Myanmar
- Netherlands (the)***
- New Zealand****
- Nigeria
- Norway
- Oman
- Pakistan
- Palau
- Panama
- Papua New Guinea
- Peru
- Philippines (the)
- Poland
- Portugal
- Qatar
- Republic of Korea (the)
- Romania
- Russian Federation (the)
- Saint Vincent and the Grenadines
- Samoa
- Saudi Arabia
- Senegal
- Serbia*****
- Seychelles
- Singapore
- Slovakia
- Slovenia
- Solomon Islands
- South Africa
- Spain
- Sri Lanka
- Sweden
- Switzerland
- Syrian Arab Republic
- Thailand
- Togo
- Tonga
- Trinidad and Tobago
- Tunisia
- Turkey
- Tuvalu
- Ukraine
- United Arab Emirates (the)
- United Kingdom (the)*****
- United Republic of Tanzania (the)
- United States (the)
- Uruguay
- Vanuatu
- Venezuela
- Viet Nam

* Includes Hong Kong, China (Associate Member of the IMO)
** Includes Faroe Islands (Associate Member of the IMO)
*** Includes Netherlands Antilles & Aruba
**** Includes The Cook Islands
***** Includes Isle of Man, Bermuda, Cayman Islands, Gibraltar
****** As from 4 February 2003, the name of the State of the Federal Republic of Yugoslavia was changed to Serbia and Montenegro. Following the dissolution of the State of Serbia and Montenegro on 3 June 2006, all treaty actions relating to the provisions of the STCW Convention undertaken by Serbia and Montenegro continue to be in force with respect to the Republic of Serbia and the Republic of Montenegro with effect from the same date, i.e. 3 June 2006.
