= Cowasjee family =

Family of old Karachi, Pakistan

The Cowasjee family is one of the oldest families settled in Karachi, Sindh, Pakistan. They owned the East & West Steamship Company, the oldest shipping company in Pakistan, established in 1883.

== Background ==
Until his death on 24 November 2012, veteran newspaper columnist Ardeshir Cowasjee was the chairman of the group and patriarch of the Cowasjee family. Ardeshir Cowasjee was also known as a philanthropist, social activist and a businessman. Some charities Ardeshir donated to are The Citizens Foundation affiliated TCF school in Lyari, Lady Dufferin Hospital, Sindh Institute of Urology and Transplantation (SIUT) and National Institute of Cardiovascular Diseases (NICD) – all in the greater Karachi area.

== See also ==
- Cowasjee Foundation
- Cowasjee Group
