= Government Shipping Office =

- قومی ادارہِ جہاز رانی ، پاکستان
- Seal of Government of Pakistan

Agency overview
- Formed: 21 May 1948; 78 years ago
- Jurisdiction: Pakistan
- Headquarters: Karachi, Pakistan
- Agency executive: Mr. Abdul Waheed Memon, Shipping Master
- Website: Official Website

The Government Shipping Office (Urdu: قومی ادارہِ جہاز رانی ، پاکستان) is an agency of the Government of Pakistan that registers and manages sailors in the Pakistan Merchant Navy. The Government Shipping Office was first established in 1923 under the Merchant Shipping Act. It was a subordinate office of the then-Ministry of Communications, now reorganised as the Ministry of Ports and Shipping, under the administrative control of Ports and Shipping Wing, Karachi.

== Purpose ==
The objective of Government Shipping Office is to administer various provisions of the Merchant Shipping Act, 1923 (now replaced by Merchant Shipping Ordinance, 2001) and Rules made there under, and to execute Government directives and ILO conventions within the orbit of the Merchant Shipping Ordinance, 2001. The principal function of the Office is to supply crew to all Pakistani and foreign ships, issue Seaman Service Book (SSB), previously Continuous Discharge Certificate (CDC) and to maintain a roster of seamen.

== Functions ==
The functions of Government Shipping Office relate to:

1. Registration and facilitation of Pakistani Seamen
2. Issue of Seaman Service Book (SSB) and issue of Seafarers’ Identity Document (SID)
3. Engagement of Seamen on Ships and Discharge of seamen from ships
4. Maintains record of service of seamen

Ports & Shipping Wing Karachi has since long been facing acute shortage of staff, its sub-ordinate and attached department are functioning below strength of manpower. Besides, Mercantile Marine Department, the Government Shipping Office is working with its 14 vacant slots of officials of different ranks.

== Shipboard Employment policy ==
Pakistan's merchant marine policy for jobs on vessel set in 2001, speaks as follows:

Every Pakistani mariner (officers, engineers or ratings) of any trade/specialization, who holds the requisite internationally, recognized qualification, where applicable, for the job/task being sought shall be issued Seamen Service Book (SSB) within 2 weeks of the receipt of complete documents. They only prerequisite for issue of this document shall be, where applicable, holding of the appropriate qualification.

== Issuance of SSB ==
SSB is issued from National Database Registration Authority (NADRA) after following prescribed procedure and deposit of fee. One of the sources of getting SSB in the category of ship's ratings/crew is conduct of courses from private sector institutions.

Prior to 1990 the Pakistan government was practicing a policy for issuance of CDC (now SSB) only to a certain number per year in order to ensure the availability of jobs to each and every seamen holding CDC under roster system. The promulgation of Merchant Shipping Ordinance (2001) contains provisions which imparts authority to institutions in private sector to offer training to semen for issuance of SSB according to their qualification. After coming into force of Merchant Shipping Ordinance, 2001, private institutes started their business of training-cum-education to prospective seamen. There are five maritime colleges in Karachi, Professional Maritime Studies (PROMTEE), Nautical Institute, Reycon, Maritime Training Centre, and in Public sector the Pakistan Maritime Academy, while one operates in Lahore, all these colleges get their operations’ license from Ministry of Ports and Shipping, Ports & Shipping Wing, Karachi. Pakistan Seamen Union discloses that there were nearly 50,000 seafarers and holder of SSB/Old System CDC, most of them had no jobs. Institutes have been charging between Rs.70,000 and Rs.80,000 for six-month training without ensuring shipboard jobs of their students, which causing a surplus in the already over-saturated job market.

== See also ==
- Pakistan Merchant Navy
- Shipping Master
- Pakistan Merchant Shipping Ordinance 2001
- Ministry of Maritime Affairs (Pakistan)
