= SS Fatima =

History
- Fate: Transferred to Pakistan

History

Pakistan
- Name: SS Fatima
- Fate: scrapped in March 1962

SS Fatima was the first ship ever registered in Karachi, Pakistan in 1948. It was cargo vessel belonging to East & West Steamship Company.

== Name ==
The ship was named after the stateswoman Fatima Jinnah, who was the younger sister of Muhammad Ali Jinnah, the founder of Pakistan.

== History ==
She was built by Burn and Company, Howrah, Calcutta in 1942. She was then a 'Basset' class naval trawler of the Royal Indian Navy under the name SHILLONG, pennant number T.250, deployed in anti-submarine and minesweeping duties. Her engine was a triple-expansion steam engine built by Lobnitz & Company, Renfrew. Sold out of the navy in 1947 and converted to a cargo ship in 1948. On 11 August 1948, she was registered at the newly established Port of Registry at Karachi.

== Specifications ==
- Gross tonnage: 671
- LOA: 153 feet

== Fate ==
It was scrapped in March 1962.
