= Gwadar Port Authority =

Government port authority in Pakistan

- گوادر پورٹ اتھارٹی
- Formation: October 17, 2002; 24 years ago
- Type: Governmental
- Purpose: Managing the Gwadar Port
- Headquarters: Gwadar, Balochistan, Pakistan
- Chairman: Noor-ul-Haq Baloch
- Affiliations: China-Pakistan Economic Corridor (CPEC)
- Website: gwadarport.gov.pk

The Gwadar Port Authority (GPA; Urdu: گوادر پورٹ اتھارٹی) is a Pakistani government organization that owns and manages the Gwadar Port, a major seaport located in Gwadar, Balochistan, Pakistan and situated on the Arabian Sea. The GPA was established on 17 October 2002 by a presidential ordinance.

The Gwadar Port Authority Ordinance, 2002 (GPA Ordinance No. LXXVII of 2002) set the GPA's responsibilities as planning, constructing, operating, managing, and maintaining the Gwadar Port. It operates under the administrative authority of the Maritime Secretary of Pakistan and is under the operational oversight of the China Overseas Port Holding Company.

== Operations ==
Gwadar Port is owned by the government-owned Gwadar Port Authority and operated by China Overseas Port Holding Company (COPHC), a state-run Chinese firm. Prior to COPHC, the port was operated by the Port of Singapore Authority.

=== Port of Singapore Authority (2007–2013) ===
Following the completion of Phase I, the Government of Pakistan in February 2007 signed a 40-year agreement with PSA International for the development and operation of the port, and an adjacent 584-acre special economic zone. PSA International was the highest bidder for the Gwadar Port, after its competitor DP World withdrew from the bidding process. PSA was granted a wide range of tax concessions, including exemption from corporate tax for 20 years, land for a special economic zone, duty-free imports of materials and equipment for construction and operations of the port, and duty-free shipping and bunker oil for 40 years. In addition to these incentives, the provincial government of Balochistan was also asked to exempt PSA International from the levy of provincial and district taxes. According to the agreement with PSA, the Government of Pakistan was to get a fixed 9% share of the revenue from cargo and maritime services, in addition to 15% of revenues earned from the adjacent special economic zone.

In September 2011, The Wall Street Journal reported that Gwadar was being underused as commercial port, and that Pakistan had asked the Chinese government to assume operations of the port. PSA also reportedly sought to withdraw from its contract with the Pakistani Government, and expressed willingness to sell its share in the project to a Chinese firm after the Pakistani Navy failed to transfer land required for development of the planned 584-acre free trade zone. PSA also did not invest the agreed $550 million into the port, on account of the poor security situation in Balochistan in the period between 2007 and 2013. The government of Pakistan also failed to invest in requisite infrastructure works. The Supreme Court of Pakistan further issued a stay order against the allotment of land to PSA on account of a public petition.

=== China Overseas Port Holding Company (2013–present) ===
On 18 February 2013, Pakistan awarded a contract for the construction and operation of Gwadar Port to a Chinese state-owned enterprise. As per details of the contract, the port would remain as property of Pakistan, but would be operated by the state-run Chinese firm – China Overseas Port Holding Company (COPHC). The contract signing ceremony was held on 18 February 2013 in Islamabad, and was attended by Pakistani President Asif Ali Zardari, Chinese Ambassador Liu Jian, as well as various federal ministers and members of parliament, as well as senior government officials. The ceremony also marked the transfer of the concession agreement from the PSA to the COPHC.

As per this agreement, 91% of the revenue generated by Gwadar Port will go to COPHC and 9% to Gwadar Port Authority. In March 2019, the Pakistani Senate was informed that during last three years, total gross revenue of Rs 358.151 million had been generated from Gwadar Port, out of which the share going to Gwadar Port Authority was Rs 32.324 million.

== Developments ==
Regarding infrastructure advancements, the GPA has devised a strategy to provide 20 MW of power to energize not only Gwadar Port but also both Gwadar Free Zones. This initiative is a component of a comprehensive plan aimed at stimulating economic activities and expediting industrialization in the Gwadar region.

In 2022 to support the local fishing community, the federal cabinet sanctioned the allocation of approximately Rs.823 million to the GPA. This funding is intended for the acquisition of boat engines for 3,291 underprivileged fishermen residing in Gwadar. Each fisherman is earmarked to receive Rs250,000 to facilitate this initiative.

== Chairmen ==
List of Chairmen of the Gwadar Port Authority
No.	Name	Start date	End date
0	Noor-ul-Haq Baloch	23 June 2025	Incumbent
1	Shah Irfan Ahmed Gharsheen	12 June 2025	17 June 2025
2	M. Daud Baloch	30 January 2025	12 June 2025
3	Pasand Khan Buledi	1 October 2022	30 January 2025
4	Naseer Khan Kashani	1 March 2019	30 September 2022
5	Dostain Khan Jamaldini	29 November 2013	1 March 2019
6	Capt. Abdul Raziq Durrani	1 July 2013	29 November 2013
7	Vice Adm. Azhar Shamim Anwar	6 March 2013	1 July 2013
8	Dr. Parvaiz Abbas	6 February 2012	6 March 2013
9	Capt. Abdul Raziq Durrani	11 December 2011	6 February 2012
10	Muhammad Aslam Hayat	4 July 2010	11 December 2011
11	Ghulam Farooq	25 January 2010	3 July 2010
12	Muhammad Aslam Hayat	9 June 2009	24 January 2010
13	Khair Muhammad Shahwani	20 May 2009	8 June 2009
14	Rear Admiral Ehsan Saeed	20 May 2007	20 May 2009
15	Commodore Munir Wahid	9 October 2006	20 May 2007
16	Rear Admiral Ehsan Chaudhary	15 August 2006	8 October 2006
17	Zia-ur-Rehman	8 April 2006	15 August 2006
18	Akbar Ali A. Pesnani	21 August 2004	7 April 2006
19	Rear Admiral Sarfraz Khan	21 January 2002	21 August 2004
