= Pakistan Marine Academy =

Maritime academy in Karachi, Pakistan

- پاکستان اکادمی برائے علومِ بحر
- Motto: Join Merchant Navy and see the World
- Type: Maritime Academy
- Established: 1962
- Affiliations: International Maritime Organization; World Maritime University; Karachi University; NED University of Engineering and Technology
- Commandant: Rizwan Khan SI
- Administrative staff: 211
- Undergraduates: 250
- Location: Karachi, Pakistan; 24°51′31″N 66°55′51″E
- Campus: Suburban, 136 acres
- Colors: Navy Blue; White
- Nickname: PMA
- Mascot: Mariner
- Website: http://www.marineacademy.edu.pk

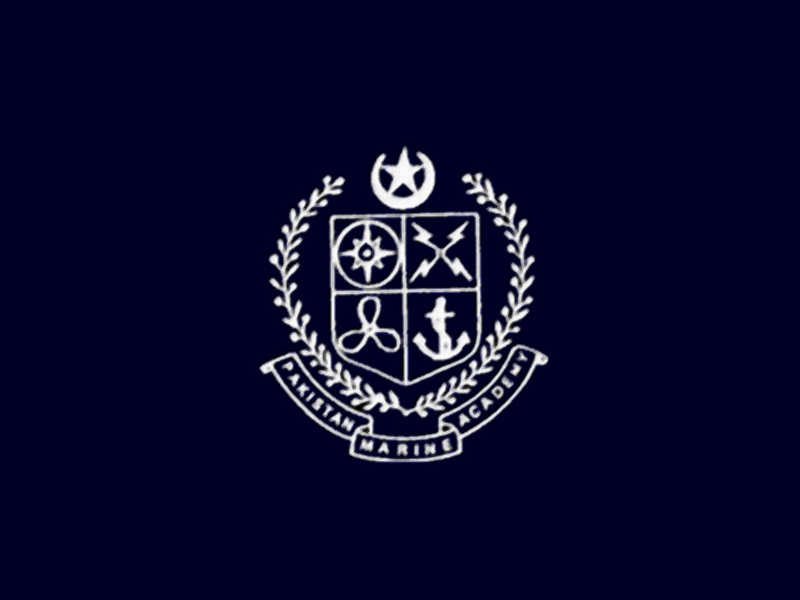
Flag of Pakistan Marine Academy

Ensign of Pakistan Merchant Navy

Pakistan Marine Academy (PMA) (Urdu: پاکستان اکادمی برائے علومِ بحر) is located at Karachi, Sindh, Pakistan. It is a Seafarers Training Academy, working under Federal Ministry of Maritime Affairs, Government of Pakistan as an autonomous department. It is affiliated with NED University of Engineering and Technology and is also recognised by Higher Education Commission, Pakistan. Pakistan Marine academy covers an area of around 136 acres on the water front in Karachi Harbor, Hawksbay Road.

All facilities are made available which are required by a maritime training institution to meet the standards set by International Maritime Organization under STCW convention. This includes Seamen Training Wing (STW), Academic block (Quaid block), residence for cadets, workshop, engine plant simulator, State of the Art Full Mission Bridge Simulator, Global Maritime Distress Safety System (GMDSS) simulator, medical center, mosque, Staff residential area and school. The academy is monitored for the training standards of the seafarers by International Maritime Organization (IMO).

== History ==
Pakistan Marine Academy was established in erstwhile East Pakistan Chittagong, in 1962. It was located on the east bank of the Karnafuli River, facing the Bay of Bengal. It was established under Colombo Plan and began functioning from 3 September 1962. It was the first institution of its kind ever established in Pakistan to train merchant marine officers. Officers and staff from Pakistan Navy and known merchant mariners, trained from the private workshops took hold of the administration of this institution. Originally, the academy provided pre-sea training for the cadets of Nautical and Engineering Branches. First batch of 41 cadets successfully passed out from the academy in 1964.

In 1971 the academy was shifted to Karachi and was housed temporarily in the two blocks of Haji Camp; thereafter, 1976, the academy was relocated at purpose built huge infrastructure at its current location.

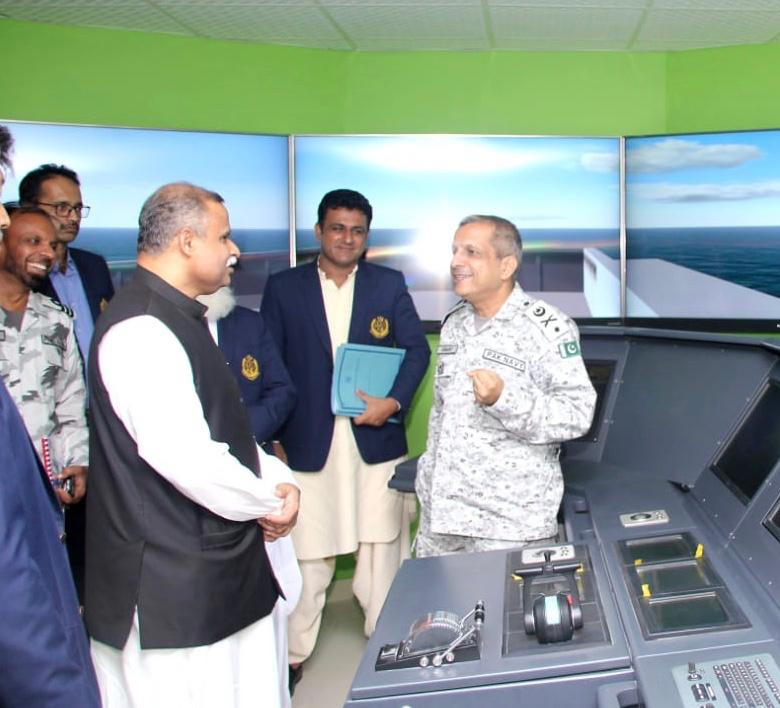
Federal Secretary Maritime Affairs Rizwan Ahmed being briefed by Commodore Rahat Ahmed Awan SI (M) during the Secretary's visit to the Pakistan Marine Academy

Prime Minister of Pakistan Zulfiqar Ali Bhutto inaugurated the institution in a stone laying ceremony. This campus occupied an area of 136 acres and is loaded with all the desired facilities. Commodore S.M. Anwar was the first Commandant of this renewed institution. Under his tenure the Auditorium (Anwar Hall), Computer lab and mosque was inaugurated. He embraced the academy with all the lacking facilities which included 8-bedded hospital; Engineering and Nautical model rooms. In 1979, Seamen Training Centre(STC) was also shifted inside the academy from Haji Camp which worked under Ministry of Communications.

In 1986, Pakistan Marine Academy was affiliated with Karachi University and became a degree awarding institution. BSc. Maritime Studies in Marine Engineering and Nautical Sciences were awarded to all the graduates of this institution. In 1997, Seamen Training Centre(STC) was renamed as Seamen Training Wing(STW) and became a subordinate body of Pakistan Marine Academy. In 2002 the marking system was changed from percentage system to GPA system as per the standards. Today, Pakistan Marine Academy houses 340 undergraduates and produces 170 graduates each year. The Seamen Training Wing houses 70 General Purpose trainees and produces 140 General Purpose Crew each year and is also conducting post-sea courses for the seafarers.

In 2012, NED University of Engineering and Technology affiliated Pakistan Marine Academy. As per the revised regulations of Higher Education Commission Pakistan, the two years BSc degree program was replaced by two years associate degree program (Equivalent to Higher National Diploma) in all the universities offering bachelor's degree after two years of higher studies. Hence forth NED University of Engineering and Technology was approved for the award of this associate degree in Ship Management or Marine Engineering to the academy's Nautical and Engineering cadets respectively on successful completion of their two years training.

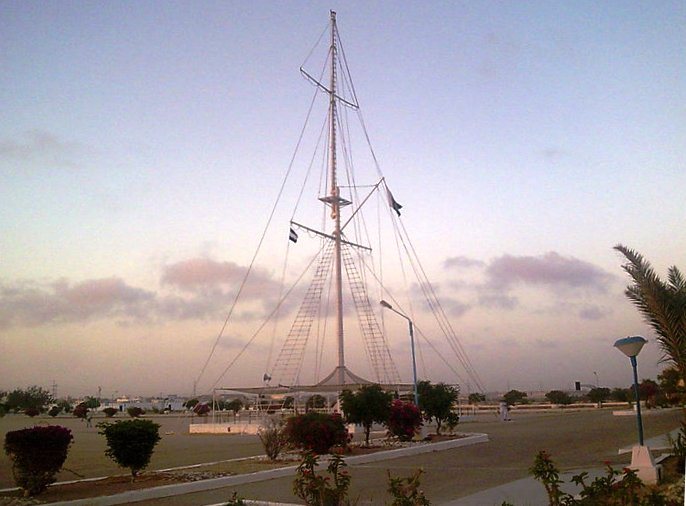
A view of the Mast of Pakistan Marine Academy in Parade Ground

== Pre-sea courses ==
There are three pre-sea courses conducted by the academy.

1. Two years associate degree program in marine engineering.
2. Two years associate degree program in nautical science.
3. Five months certificate course for general-purpose(GP-III) rating.

=== Two years associate degree program in marine engineering ===
Cadets are inducted each year in the month of January for this course. The course is divided into four semesters. On the completion of the course an associate degree in Marine Engineering is awarded which enables the cadet to serve as an Engineering Officer on board the merchant ships. It is mandatory for the marine engineering cadets to do one year apprenticeship in either Pakistan National Shipping Corporation or Karachi Port Trust Workshops after passing out from the academy. Cadets are required to stay within the academy during the two-year course.

English, mathematics, physics, Pakistan studies, Islamic studies and international maritime law are the mandatory subjects for the associate degree program regardless of the branch.

For associate degree program in Marine Engineering further subjects are added to the mandatory subjects which include Internal Combustion Engines Knowledge, General Engineering Knowledge, Workshop Practice, Applied Mechanics, Applied Thermodynamics, Electro-technology, Instrumentation and Control Systems, Naval Architecture and Ship Construction and Machine Drawing.

=== Two-year associate degree program in nautical science ===
Similar to the marine engineering program the induction of cadets for associate degree program in nautical science takes place each year in the month of January and similarly the course is divided into four semesters. On the completion of the course an associate degree in ship management is awarded which enable the cadet to serve as a deck officer on board the merchant ships. As per the rules of the academy the cadets of this course are also required to stay within the academy until the completion of the course.

For the complete associate degree program in nautical science, further subjects are added to the mandatory subjects which include principles of navigation, ocean and off-shore navigation, electronic navigation systems, radar navigation, coastal navigation, seamanship, marine communications, watch keeping, ship stability, ship construction, cargo handling and stowage, and marine meteorology.

=== Five-month general-purpose rating ===
The pre–sea training for GP rating is conducted at the Seamen Training Wing which is an organisation of Pakistan Marine Academy and is located within the academy premises. This course is of five months and it is conducted twice each year.

The GP rating training course include training in nautical, engineering at support level and including mandatory STCW courses. After completion of the course, central examination is held under the supervision of examiners appointed by the Ports and Shipping Wing. The course is monitored and controlled for quality and standards during this period by the examiners. The passing trainee gets the GP-III certification and the certificate of all the general courses.

== Cadets intake per year ==
170 cadets are selected each year, for the two years associate degree program, out of which 150 are selected on the basis of merit and 20 (10 in each discipline i.e. Nautical Science and Marine Engineering) are inducted under self finance scheme (SFS). In Self Finance Scheme the one has to deposit a certain amount (which may vary each year) in Pakistani Rupees excluding Academy Fees. Ministry of Maritime Affairs, also provides 33 fully paid need based scholarship to Cadets. By the end of December, 2020, PMA has trained and floated 57 batches of Cadets.

Number of students selected for GP-III training course depends upon the demand of Pakistan National Shipping Corporation and registered companies manning foreign shipping companies. Hence, they may vary each year.

== Number of graduates from Pakistan Marine Academy ==
=== Marine Academy, Chittagong ===
Batch	Year Passed	Number
1st	1964	41
2nd	1965	41
3rd	1966	42
4th	1967	44
5th	1968	44
6th	1969	44
7th	1970	44
8th	1971	44

=== Pakistan Marine Academy, Karachi ===
Batch	Year Passed	Number
9th	1972	22
10th	1973	36
11th	1974	70
12th	1975	59
13th	1976	77
14th	1977	77
15th	1978	77
16th	1979	77
17th	1980	77
18th	1981	34

== Eligibility ==
For the associate degree program in marine engineering or nautical science only male citizens of the Islamic Republic of Pakistan are eligible to apply. The applicant must not be more than twenty years of age by 31 December of the year in which he is applying for admission. However, a one-year relaxation is given to the candidates from Federally Administered Tribal Areas and Azad Kashmir. Applicants must have a Secondary School Certificate and a Higher Secondary School Certificate with at least second division. He must be declared medically fit by the military hospital and Mercantile Marine Department of the Ministry of Ports and Shipping.

Cadets from friendly countries are admitted only when sponsored by the government of their respective nations on a government-to-government arrangement and on the basis of the availability of seats.

For general-purpose training course candidate must have Secondary School Certificate (SSC) or certificate of equivalent examinations. He must be 18 to 25 years of age on the date of the commencement of course. He must be declared medically fit by military hospital and Mercantile Marine Department of the Ministry of Ports and Shipping.

== Organization ==
The academy is funded by the Ministry of Maritime Affairs, Higher Education Commission recognizes educational standard, whereas, Pakistan Navy assists in professional/physical training. The entire student body is referred to as the Cadets of Pakistan Marine Academy. The body is subdivided into six divisions Jinnah, Iqbal, Qasim, Tippu and Jauhar. Each division is led by a Cadet Captain. These Cadet Captains are led by a Regulating Cadet Captain. Sports and physical activities are led by the Sports Cadet Captain. Whole body is led by the Chief Cadet Captain. Each division contains cadets from both the Nautical and Engineering Branch. Similarly, the entire administration and teaching staff is referred as Authority which is led by the Commandant Pakistan Marine Academy, Deputy Commandant, Chief Education Officer (CEO) and Training Commander. Academy also has its subordinate body referred as Seamen Training Wing (STW) which conducts all the post-sea courses and mandatory pre-sea courses including a pre-sea course of General Purpose Crew (GP-3) training.

== Alumni Association ==
Marine Academy Old Boys Association (MAcOBA) is an alumni association formed by the graduates of Pakistan Marine Academy. It was formed in 1970 when sixth batch graduated. All the graduates of the institution from the two years degree program become the part of the Association and are referred as Marine Academy Old Boys (MAcOBs). The association is led by President, vice-president, General Secretary, Joint Secretary and executive members. The fresh graduates of the academy work voluntarily for the association and are referred as the Task Force.

The objective of the Association is to create sense of belonging amongst the Old Boys of the institution and help the fresh blood with their career. The association also works for the betterment of Pakistan Merchant Navy and the institution itself. The association also raise funds for a cause and helps any graduate in need.

== Notable alumni ==
- Abdul Awal Mintoo – Graduated in 1968

== Merchant navy rank insignia of deck officers and engineer officers ==
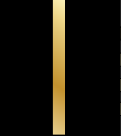
Shoulder rank insignia of a deck cadet or engine cadet

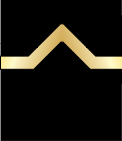
Shoulder rank insignia of petty officer or junior engineer

Shoulder rank insignia of third officer or fourth engineer

Shoulder rank insignia of second officer or third engineer

Shoulder rank insignia of a chief officer or second engineer

Shoulder rank insignia of a captain or chief engineer

== See also ==
- Merchant Navy (Pakistan)
- PNSC
- Government Shipping Office
- Ministry of Maritime Affairs (Pakistan)
