= Pakistan National Shipping Corporation =

Government owned company

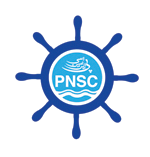

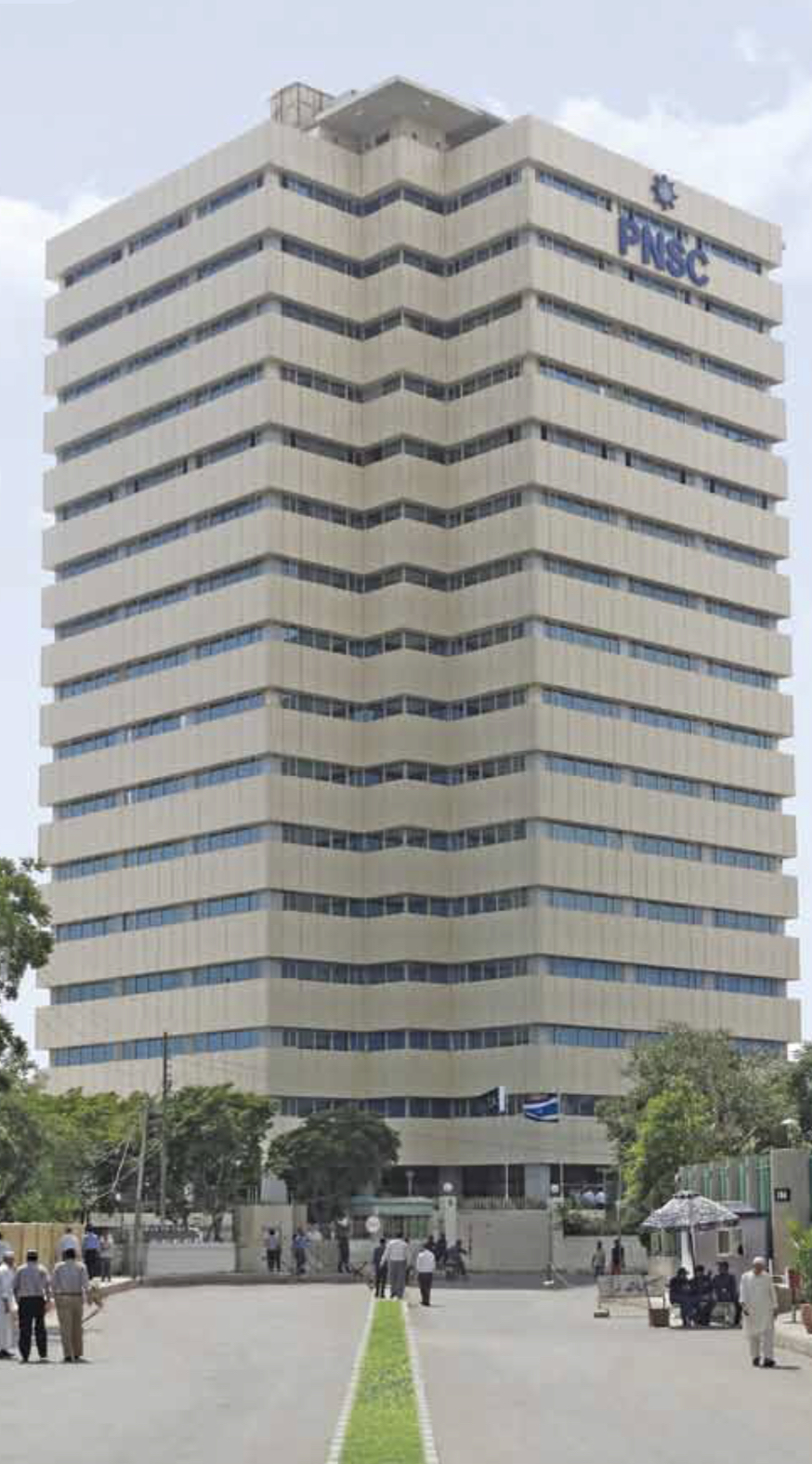
- PNSC Headquarters in Karachi
- Native name: شرکت کشتیرانی قومی پاکستان
- Type: Public
- Traded as: PSX: PNSC
- Industry: Shipping and Vessel industry
- Genre: Megacorporation
- Predecessor: Chittagong Steamship Corporation; Crescent Shipping; East & West Steamship Company; Gulf Shipping Corp Ltd; Muhammadi Steamship Company Limited; National Shipping Corporation; Pakistan Shipping; Pan Islamic Shipping; Trans-Oceanic Steamship Company; United Oriental Steamship Company
- Founded: 1963; 63 years ago
- Headquarters: Karachi-74000, Pakistan
- Key people: Sultan Chawla (Chairman)
- Products: Cargo Ships, Tankers, Container ships, and Bulk carriers
- Net income: Rs. 30 Billion (Profit after tax as of June 2022)
- Website: www.pnsc.com.pk

Ensign of Pakistan Merchant Navy

Flag of Pakistan National Shipping Corporation

The Pakistan National Shipping Corporation (PNSC) is a Pakistani national flag carrier headquartered in Karachi. In 2022 under the chairmanship of Rizwan Ahmed, PNSC recorded its total deadweight tonnage (DWT) at 1,045,657 metric tons which is to date the highest ever carrying capacity achieved since its inception. The corporation is principally engaged in the business of shipping, including charter of vessels, transportation of cargo and providing commercial, technical, administrative, financial and other services to its subsidiaries and third parties.

The Chairman of PNSC is appointed by the Prime Minister of Pakistan and is usually a high-ranking civil servant or naval admiral. Officers who have served as Chairman PNSC include Pakistan Administrative Service bureaucrats Rizwan Ahmed and Shakeel Ahmed Mangnejo, Admiral Tauqir Hussain Naqvi, Admiral Yastur-ul-Haq Malik, Admiral Saeed Mohammad Khan and Admiral Mansurul Haq.

PNSC, headquartered in Karachi, is under the administrative control of the Federal Ministry of Maritime Affairs. A regional office based in Lahore caters to upcountry shipping requirements. The corporation also has an extensive overseas network of agents looking after its worldwide shipping business. The Pakistan Merchant Navy is the fleet of state-owned merchant vessels flying the flag of Pakistan National Shipping Corporation.

== History ==
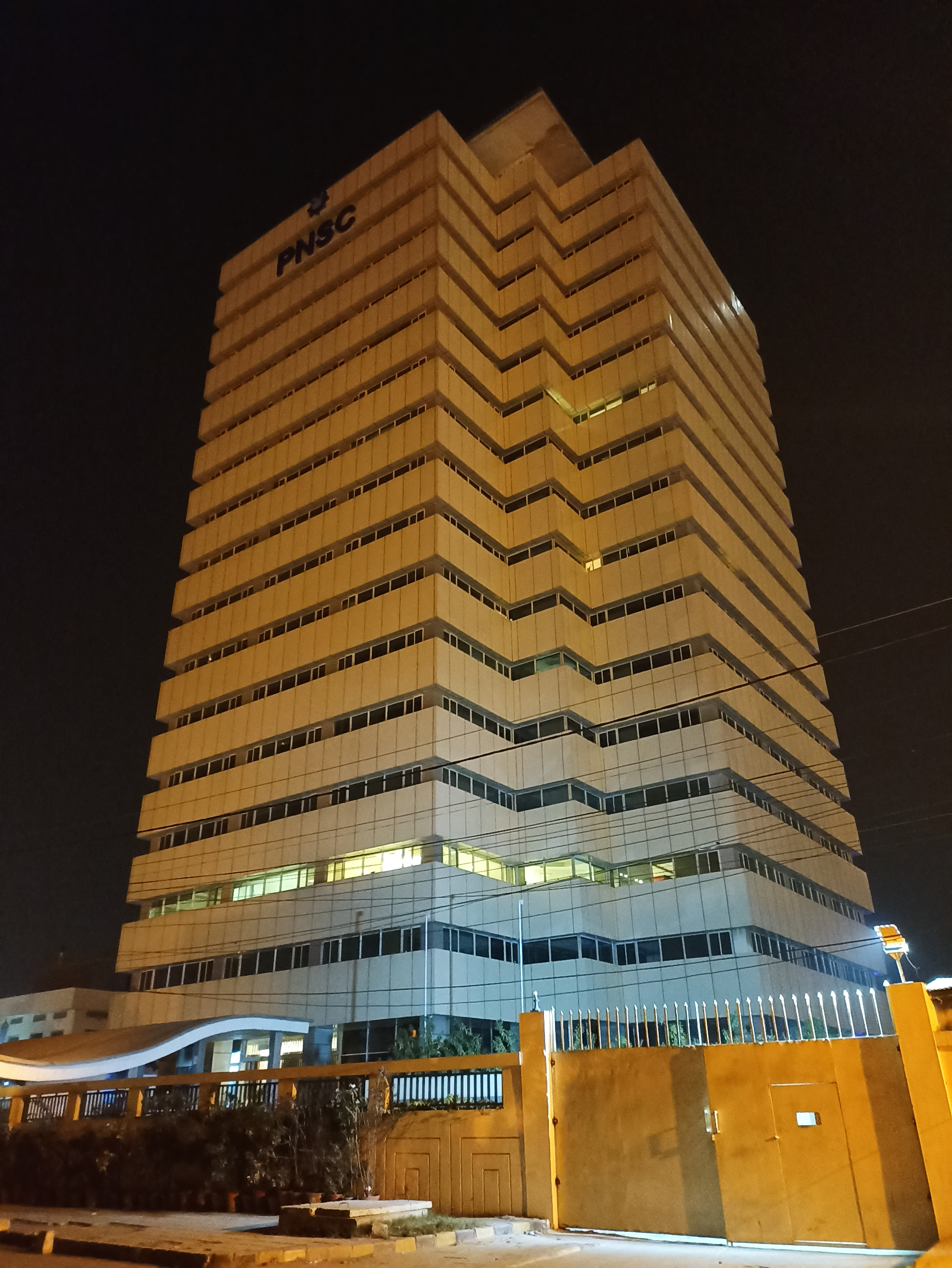
PNSC Building at night

The Pakistan Merchant Navy was formed after independence in 1947 when Pakistan inherited a fleet of four privately owned cargo ships. The Ministry of Maritime Affairs, Mercantile Marine Department and Government Shipping Office established by the Government of Pakistan were authorised to flag the ships and also ensured that the vessels were seaworthy.

In 1963, the National Shipping Ordinance was promulgated and National Shipping Corporation (NSC) was established which procured its first used ship, M.V. Rupsa in 1965. The national fleet comprised some 53 vessels which were owned by 10 private shipping companies. The national fleet grew to 71 vessels before the separation of East Pakistan and its emergence as Bangladesh in 1971 when the number declined to 57 vessels after the separation.

On 1 January 1974, President of Pakistan Zulfiqar Ali Bhutto nationalised Chittagong Steamship Corporation and Trans-Oceanic Steamship Company, owned by the Dinshaw family; East & West Steamship Company, owned by the Cowasjee family; Muhammadi Steamship Company Limited and Gulf Shipping Corp Ltd, owned by the Valika family; United Oriental Steamship Company, owned by the Chinioti Buksh family; Pan Islamic Shipping, owned by Saudis; Crescent Shipping, owned by the Crescent Group; and National Shipping Corporation (NSC). Nine private shipping companies with a total of 26 ships were nationalised. The national fleet strength increased to 51 vessels including 26 ships under the management of nine nationalised companies and 25 ships with the state-owned NSC.

In 1977, 14 ships were inducted in the Pakistan Shipping Corporation (PSC) during the Fifth Five-Year Plan. Two years later, NSC and PSC were merged to form the Pakistan National Shipping Corporation (PNSC) which still remains the sole state-owned shipping corporation.

Later other nationalised companies were also merged into a single company as the Pakistan National Shipping Corporation, incorporated under the provisions of the Pakistan National Shipping Corporation Ordinance of 1979 and the Companies Ordinance of 1984, respectively. The total fleet strength increased to 60 ships with the induction of 14 vessels in the late 1970s and early 1980s. PNSC enjoyed a complete monopoly till the early 1990s when the shipping sector was deregulated by the Nawaz Sharif government.

== Subsidiaries ==
- Bolan Shipping (Private) Limited
- Chitral Shipping (Private) Limited
- Hyderabad Shipping (Private) Limited
- Khairpur Shipping (Private) Limited
- Malakand Shipping (Private) Limited
- Multan Shipping (Private) Limited
- Sibi Shipping (Private) Limited
- Karachi Shipping (Private) Limited
- Lahore Shipping (Private) Limited
- Quetta Shipping (Private) Limited
- Shalamar Shipping (Private) Limited

== Former company titles ==
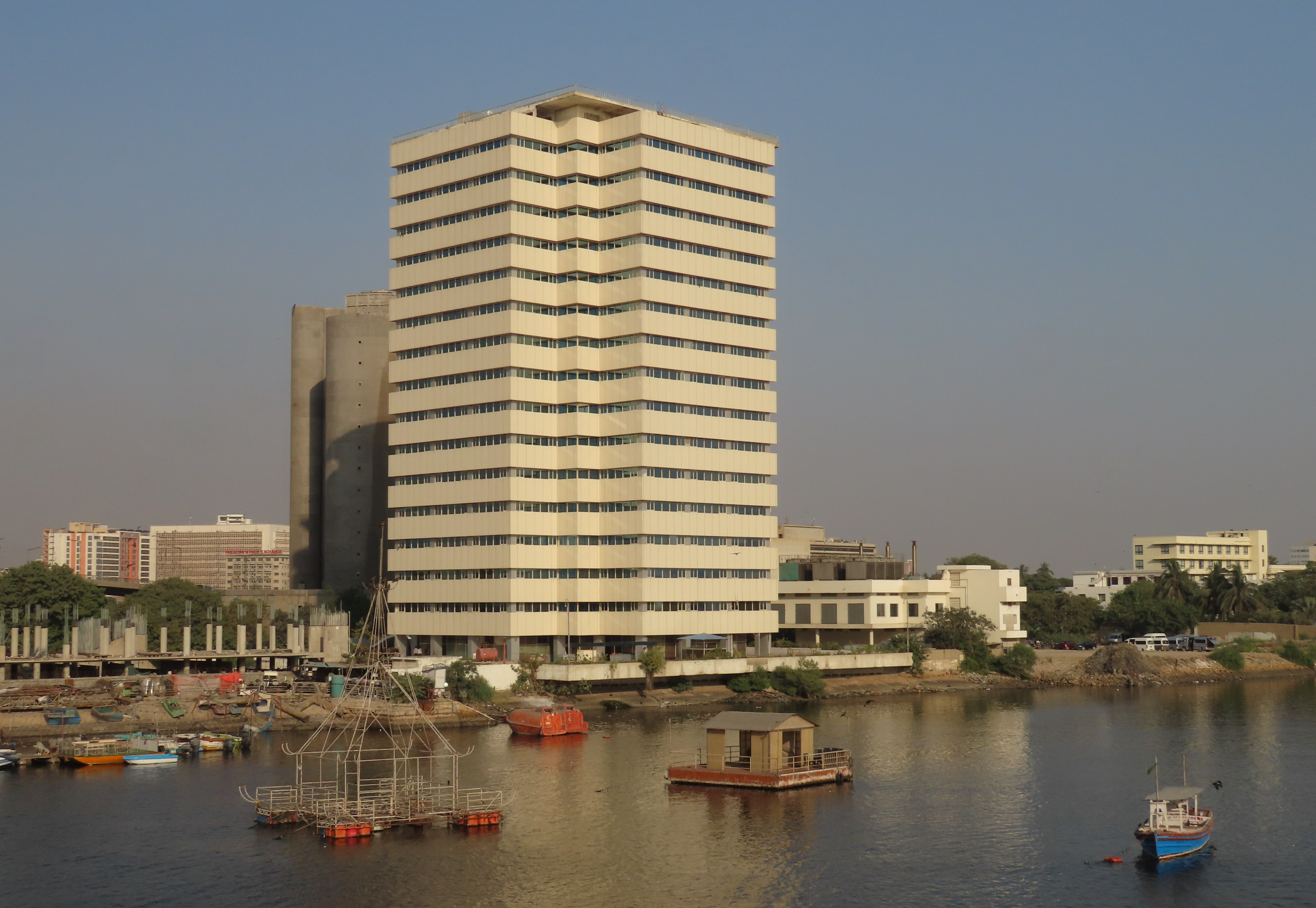
PNSC Building seen from the Chinna Creek

Muhammadi Steamship Company Limited was incorporated on 12 May 1947. In 1949, it became the first Pakistani shipping line to be publicly listed on the Karachi Stock Exchange.

Muhammadi House on McLeod Road (now I. I. Chundrigar Road) was the headquarters of the company.

The company was nationalised by the Government of Pakistan under then President Zulfikar Ali Bhutto. It was later merged with other Pakistani nationalised shipping companies to create the Pakistan National Shipping Corporation.

East & West Steamship Company was one of the oldest locally owned shipping line in Pakistan until it was nationalised in 1974. Its ship, SS Fatima was the first ship ever registered at the newly established Port of Registry at Karachi in August 1948. It was owned by the Cowasjee family. The company was restructured as the 'East and West Steamship Co. Ltd.' in 1961

The National Shipping Corporation (NSC) was established under the National Shipping Corporation Ordinance, 1963, with a view to provide efficient shipping services. The corporation was managed by a Board of nine directors, out of which five including the chairman, the managing director and the Financial Director were appointed by the Central Government and remaining four were elected by the shareholders from each Province. The authorized capital of the corporation was Rs. 250 million and the subscribed capital was to be Rs. 50 million. The share of Central Government in the capital was 25% and the balance of 75% was raised from the public in East and West Pakistan on the basis of parity.

In 1974 the Federal Government decided to take over the management and control of entire shipping in Pakistan, including NSC through promulgation of the Pakistan Maritime Shipping (Regulation and control) Ordinance, 1974 which later on became an Act. In September, 1976 the Federal Government established the Pakistan Shipping Corporation (PSC) under the Pakistan Shipping Corporation Act, 1976, to take charge of ten shipping companies and operate as a parallel corporation with the National Shipping Corporation (NSC).

== Active Fleet ==
Ship	Built	In service for the company	Type	Tonnage	Fate	Reference	Notes
MV Kaghan	1986	2006–Present	Bulk Carrier	36098 GT	Currently in use		Built by Namura Ship Building Co., Japan
MT Quetta	2003	2008–Present	Aframax Oil Tanker	58118 GT	Currently in use		Built by Imabari Shipbuilding Co. Ltd, Japan.
MT Lahore	2003	2010–Present	Aframax Oil Tanker	58157 GT	Currently in use		Built by Imabari Shipbuilding Co. Ltd, Japan
MT Karachi	2003	2010–Present	Aframax Oil Tanker	58127 GT	Currently in use		Built by Imabari Shipbuilding Co. Ltd, Japan
MV Chitral	2003	2010–Present	Handymax Bulk Carrier	26395 GT	Currently in use		Built by Oshima Shipbuilding Co. Ltd, Japan
MV Malakand	2004	2010–Present	Panamax Bulk Carrier	40040 GT	Currently in use		Built by Sasebo Heavy Industry Co. Ltd, Sasebo, Japan
MV Hyderabad	2004	2011–Present	Supramax Bulk Carrier	29364 GT	Currently in use		Built in Oshima Shipyard, Nagasaki, Japan
MV Sibi	2009	2011–Present	Handysize Bulk Carrier	17018 GT	Currently in use		Built by Imabari Shipbuilding Co. Ltd, Marugame, Japan
MV Multan	2002	2012–Present	Supramax Bulk Carrier	27986 GT	Currently in use		Built by Mitsui Engineering & Ship Building Co. Ltd. TAMANO Works, Japan
MT Shalamar	2006	2015–Present	Aframax Oil Tanker	55894 GT	Currently in use		Built by Sumitomo Heavy Industries, Japan

== Former Fleet ==
Ship	Built	In service for the company	Type	Tonnage	Fate	Reference	Notes
MV Nawabshah	1981	1981-1985	Multipurpose General Cargo	13402 GT	Sank in Malaka straight after hitting rock PU Rondo at 11:02 (LT) on 23-08-1985		Built by Gdańsk Shipyard Gdańsk, Poland
MV Murree	1981	1981-1989	Multipurpose General Cargo,	11940 GT	Sank at 49°57′30″N 3°14′5″W, near by cities Plymouth, Bournemouth, Cardiff in strong typhoon, 1989. All crew rescued by Royal Air force		Built by A&P Group, Sunderland, United Kingdom.
MV Kaghan	1981	1981-2004	Multipurpose General Cargo	10246 GT	Sold to Cheer Glory Traders China		Built in Bremen. Not to be confused with MV Kaghan Bulk Carrier.
MT Shalamar	1981	2003-2007	Oil Tanker	54474 GT	Scrapped in 2007		Built in Sanoyas Mizushima Works & Shipyard Kurashiki, Japan
MV Makran	1979	1979-2009	Multipurpose General Cargo	16199 GT	Scrapped in 2009		Built by Nakskov Skibsvaerft Nakskov, Denmark
MV Chitral	1980	1980-2009	Multipurpose General Cargo	12395 GT	Scrapped in 2009		Built by Kawasaki Heavy Industries Kobe, Japan. Not to be confused with MV Chitral Bulk Carrier
MV Hyderabad	1980	1980-2009	Multipurpose General Cargo	12395 GT	Sold to M/S Blue Seas Marine		Mitsui Tamano Engineering & Shipbuilding Tamano, Japan. Not to be confused with MV Hyderabad Bulk Carrier
MV Malakand	1980	1980-2009	Multipurpose General Cargo	18224 GT	Sold to M/S Blue Seas Marine		Ihi Marine United Tokyo, Japan. Not to be confused with MV Malakand Bulk Carrier
MV Sibi	1981	1986-2009	Multipurpose General Cargo	13402 GT	Sold to M/S Blue Seas Marine		Built in Gdańsk Shipyard Poland
MT Johar	1985	2003-2009	Oil Tanker	49688 GT	Sold to Cheer Glory Traders, China		Built by Navantia Carenas Ferrol, Spain
MT Lalazar	1984	2005-2009	Oil Tanker	49688 GT	Scrapped in 2009		Built by Fincantieri Monfalcone Trieste, Italy.
MV Bolan	1980	1980-2010	Multipurpose General Cargo	12395 GT	Scrapped in 2010		Built by Kawasaki Kobe Japan
MT Sawat	1985	2003-2010	Oil Tanker	49601 GT	Scrapped in 2010		Built by Fincantieri Monfalcone Trieste, Italy.
MV Khairpur	1981	1981-2011	Multipurpose General Cargo	13402 GT	Scrapped in 2011		Built by Gdańsk Shipyard Gdańsk, Poland
MV Sargodha	1980	1980-2012	Multipurpose General Cargo	12395 GT	Scrapped in 2012		Built by Oshima Shipbuilding Saikai, Japan
MV Multan	1980	1980-2012	Multipurpose General Cargo	12395 GT	Scrapped in 2012		Built in Japan.
MV Islamabad	1983	1983–2013	Multi-Purpose General Cargo	12395 GT	Scrapped in 2013		Built at Karachi Shipyard, Pakistan.

== Merchant Navy Rank Insignia of Deck Officers and Engineer Officers ==
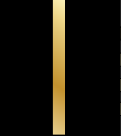
Shoulder rank insignia of a Deck Cadet or Engine Cadet

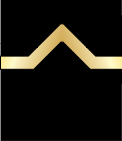
Shoulder rank insignia of Petty Officer or Junior Engineer

Shoulder rank insignia of 3rd Officer or 4th Engineer

Shoulder rank insignia of 2nd Officer or 3rd Engineer

Shoulder rank insignia of a Chief Officer or 2nd Engineer

Shoulder rank insignia of a Captain or Chief Engineer

== See also ==
- List of ports in Pakistan
- Pakistan Marine Academy
- Government Shipping Office
- Shipping Master
- Merchant Navy
- Yastur-ul-Haq Malik
- Rizwan Ahmed
- Saeed Mohammad Khan
- Ministry of Maritime Affairs (Pakistan)
