= Shipping master =

A shipping master is an appointment in some countries that manages certain affairs of the merchant navy. The exact duties a shipping master carries out depends on the particular laws of the country.

== Cayman Islands ==
In the Cayman Islands, the Shipping Master administers shipping activities in relation to the engagement and discharge of seafarers from ships. The Shipping Master may represent the Government at various international forums such as the International Maritime Organization and the ILO.

== Pakistan ==
In Pakistan, the Shipping Master is the head of the Government Shipping Office and is appointed by the Government of Pakistan. The Shipping Master is the issuing authority for the Seaman Service Book to merchant navy sailors, and grants port clearance to incoming and outgoing merchant ships at the seaports. The Shipping Master is also responsible for implementing the rules and ILO conventions in relation to the Pakistan Merchant Shipping Ordinance 2001, and is a member of the Central Maritime Advisory Committee.

== See also ==
- Harbourmaster
