= S. M. Ahsan =

Pakistani admiral (1920–1989)

S. M. Ahsan SQA SPk DSC
- ایس ایم احسن
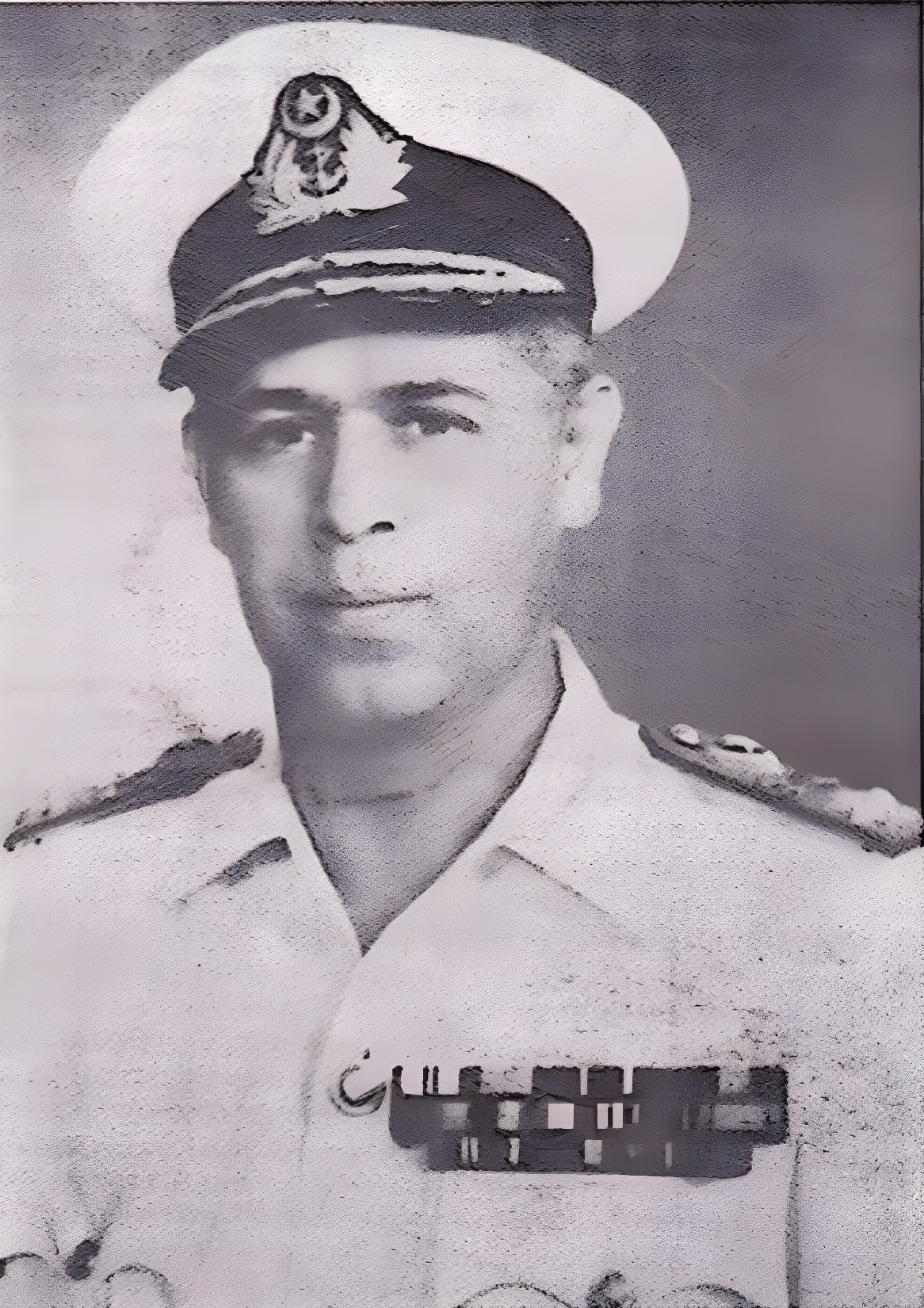
- Official Military portrait c. 1967

4th Commander-in-Chief Pakistan Navy
- In office 20 October 1966 – 31 August 1969
- President: Ayub Khan (1958–1969); Yahya Khan (1969-1971)
- Preceded by: A. R. Khan
- Succeeded by: Muzaffar Hassan

4th Chairman Port Qasim Authority
- In office 27 June 1978 – 9 June 1980
- Preceded by: I. H. Malik
- Succeeded by: A. Waliulla

Chairman Pakistan National Shipping Corporation
- In office 22 April 1974 – 18 July 1976

11th Governor of East Pakistan
- In office 1 September 1969 – 1 March 1971
- President: General Yahya Khan
- Preceded by: Sahabzada Yaqub Khan
- Succeeded by: Sahabzada Yaqub Khan

8th Minister of Finance
- In office 5 April 1969 – 3 August 1969
- President: General Yahya Khan
- Preceded by: N M Uqaili
- Succeeded by: Muzaffar Ali Khan Qizilbash

Chief of Military Planning South East Asia Treaty Organization
- In office 29 June 1962 – 30 June 1964
- Preceded by: Major General JGN Wilton
- Succeeded by: Major General Hugh Anthony Prince

Personal details
- Born: Syed Mohammad Ahsan; 21 November 1920 Hyderabad, Hyderabad Deccan
- Died: 4 August 1989 (aged 68) Karachi, Sindh, Pakistan
- Children: 3
- Relatives: Muhammad Jalaluddin Sayeed (cousin); Huma Abedin (great niece); K. M. Hussain
- Education: Nizam College; Joint Services Staff College (UK)
- Awards: See list
- Nickname: Grossadmiral von Ahsan

Military service
- Allegiance: British India; Pakistan
- Branch/service: Royal Indian Navy (1940–1947); Pakistan Navy (1947–1969)
- Years of service: 1940—1971
- Rank: Vice Admiral
- Commands: Pakistan Navy; Naval Intelligence; PNS Babur; PNS Tughril; PNS Tariq
- Battles/wars: World War II; Battle of the Atlantic; Arakan Campaign 1942–43; Mediterranean theatre; Indo-Pakistani War of 1965

Syed Mohammad Ahsan (Note: Urdu: سید محمد احسن; Sometimes spelled Syed Mohammed Ahsan and Sayed Mohammed Ahsan. He was also known as Syed Ahsan.) (21 November 1920 – 4 August 1989) known as S. M. Ahsan, was a Pakistani former three-star rank naval officer who served as the fourth Commander-in-Chief of the Pakistan Navy from 1966 to 1969, the eighth Finance Minister of Pakistan in 1969, and the eleventh Governor of East Pakistan from September 1969 to March 1971. He later served as chairman of the National Shipping Corporation from 1974 to 1976 and the fourth chairman of the Port Qasim Authority from 1978 to 1980.

Born in Hyderabad, Ahsan was educated at Nizam College before joining the Royal Indian Navy as an executive cadet in 1936. Commissioned in the early years of the Second World War, he commanded two Motor Launches against Japanese forces up the Naf River in January 1943 and sank a Japanese vessel in the Bay of Bengal. For his gallantry, he was awarded the Distinguished Service Cross. He later served as an aide-de-camp to Louis Mountbatten, the last Viceroy of India.

One week shy of the Partition of 1947, Ahsan was appointed as an aide-de-camp to Governor-General designate of Pakistan, Muhammad Ali Jinnah, and continued in this role following his transfer to the Pakistan Navy. He later served as an aide-de-camp to Governor-General Nazimuddin. From 1955 to 1956, he was Pakistan's Naval Attaché in Washington, D.C., and was awarded the Legion of Merit for his service. In 1957, he became the first commanding officer of PNS Babur. He was the first Deputy Chief of the Military Planning Office of the Southeast Asia Treaty Organization (SEATO) from 1960 to 1962, before being elevated to Chief, a position he held until 1964.

Forced to give up command of the Navy, Vice Admiral Ahsan, against his will, was appointed Governor of East Pakistan by President Yahya Khan in 1969. His tenure was marked by two major events in 1970: the Bhola Cyclone and the general elections. In the aftermath of the deadliest tropical cyclone on record, the military leadership refused to provide him helicopters for relief operations. Ahsan subsequently established his camp within the disaster zone and personally oversaw relief efforts, earning praise for his hands-on work.

The Awami League led by Sheikh Mujibur Rahman, had won a majority in the National Assembly after the elections. The West Pakistani military establishment and Pakistan Peoples Party leader Zulfikar Ali Bhutto's refusal to hand over power to the Awami League, led to a political deadlock that eventually gave rise to a civil war. Ahsan, who was believed to be sympathetic towards the Awami League, strongly opposed a military solution and repeatedly urged Yahya Khan to pursue a political settlement. In an effort to resolve the crisis, Governor Ahsan held talks with Bhutto, Sheikh Mujibur Rahman, and Yahya Khan. His opposition to a military crackdown in the region led to his removal just weeks before the start of Operation Searchlight in March 1971.

== Early life and education ==
Syed Mohammad Ahsan was born on 21 November 1920 in Hyderabad. His father, Mahomed Saif-ud-Din, was a former Deputy Assistant Secretary in the Public Works Department. Ahsan was educated at the Nizam College. He appeared for the HMIS Dufferin (Note: The Dufferin Competitive Qualifying Examination was the entrance examination for cadets seeking admission to the officer training course aboard HMIS Dufferin) Competitive Qualifying Examination in Bombay from October 29 to 31, 1935, and successfully qualified. He was subsequently invited for an interview and selection for admission in December 1935.

Ahsan, along with his first cousin Muhammad Jalaluddin Sayeed, left their hometown in 1936 to board the Indian Mercantile Marine Training Ship, HMIS Dufferin, which sailed from Bombay Harbour. At the end of 1938, Ahsan passed out in second place of his batch of deck cadets, while Sayeed came in first place.

== Personal life ==
Ahsan married Nighat. They had three children, including a daughter named Nyla. His great niece is American political staffer Huma Abedin. He was also related to K. M. Hussain.

Group Captain Mian Ata Rabbani, who served alongside Ahsan and Gul Hassan Khan as aide-de-camps (ADC) to Pakistan's founder and Governor-General Muhammad Ali Jinnah, as the air force, naval, and army ADCs respectively, described Ahsan as "the most serious, serene, and sober." among the three. He noted that Ahsan was deeply fond of books and spent most of his free time reading with a cigar. He rarely left the Governor-General House, preferring to spend even his designated rest days in his room or on the lawns, with a book always in hand.

Ahsan was fond of sailing and while serving as Commander-in-Chief, by chance discovered the area for what would become Port Qasim.

On 26 March 1969, a day after General Yahya Khan established his martial law regime, Thomas L. Hughes confidentially conveyed the biographic information of the "principal actors". He wrote that Ahsan, "has had an amicable relationship with Americans, is highly Westernized and, despite a possible early association with the Jama' at-i-Islami, is not an Islamic fundamentalist."

== Service years ==
=== Royal Indian Navy and World War II Service ===
Ahsan joined the Royal Indian Navy as an executive cadet in 1936 and became a cadet in 1939, serving aboard HMS Royal Sovereign. In January 1940, Cadet Ahsan was on the acting list of the navy. He was commissioned as Midshipman on 1 April 1940.

On 19 December 1942, the 55th R.I.N.M.L. Flotilla, which was the first of its kind to be commissioned, sailed for Chittagong to undertake operations against Japanese forces and gave flank support to the 14th Indian Infantry Division. Lieutenant Ahsan was among the commanding officers of the flotilla's Motor Launches. In January 1943, he led Motor Launches 440 and 441 up the Naf River in search of a Japanese vessel and successfully destroyed the enemy ship. For his gallantry, he was awarded the Distinguished Service Cross.

From 1943 to 1944, he was on a Specialist Navigation Course. (Note: Abbreviations next to an officers name were used to denote where an Officer is serving when not afloat. In this case, the "(N.) Cse" next to Ahsan's name in the navy list, stood for "Specialist Navigation Course.") Specialised in communications, Ahsan was an instructor at the Combined Cadet Force in Liverpool, England. During the Royal Indian Navy mutiny in February 1946, he was the staff communication officer at Naval Headquarters (NHQ). He stated that, during his search of ratings' lockers at HMIS India, (Note: An establishment in Delhi composed primarily of signal personnel and other ratings' attached to the NHQ.) he discovered communist literature. He also reported finding two calendars with photographs of officers of the Indian National Army and its leader, Subhas Chandra Bose.

Lieutenant Ahsan later served as an aide-de-camp (ADC) to the Viceroy and Governor-General of India, Louis Mountbatten. Mountbatten's daughter Lady Pamela Hicks recalled in her 2012 memoir that in late July 1947, her father told Ahsan, that as a Muslim, he should go to Karachi to assist setting up Muhammad Ali Jinnah's Government House. In either a note or a final meeting with Jinnah, Mountbatten told him: "Jinnah, I leave you Pakistan and I leave you Lieutenant Ahsan."

Jinnah arrived at Mauripur station from Delhi as the Governor-General-designate of the imminent nation in a Dakota aircraft from the Viceroy's fleet on 7 August 1947, a week before Pakistan's independence. He was accompanied by his sister Fatima Jinnah and his aides-de-camp (ADCs), Ahsan and Rabbani. Lieutenant Ahsan assumed the duties of ADC on 13 August 1947.

=== Pakistan Navy ===
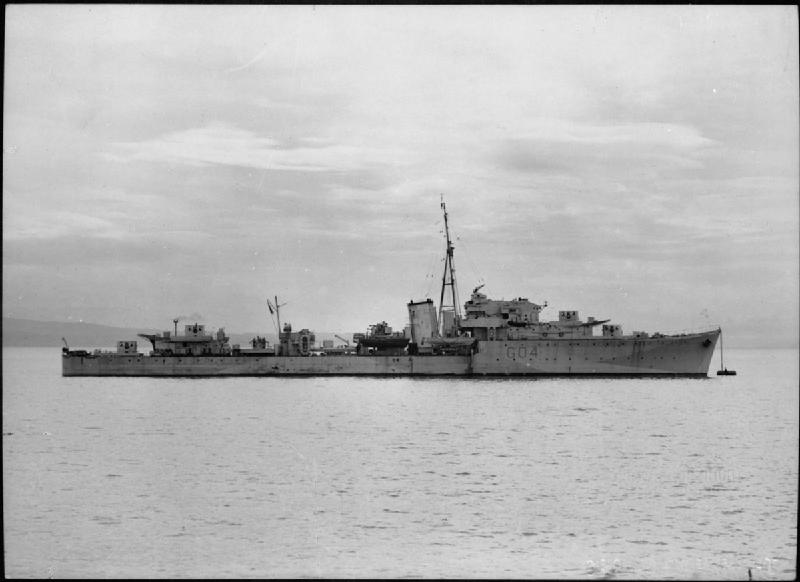
HMS Onslaught at a buoy during the Second World War, before its transfer to Pakistan as HMPS Tughril, which Ahsan commanded from 1951.

Following the Partition of British India on 14 August 1947, the Royal Pakistan Navy (RPN) was formed on 15 August. Lieutenant Ahsan was officially appointed as the first naval aide-de-camp to Governor General Muhammad Ali Jinnah. According to Raja Tridev Roy, while installing Jinnah as Governor-General, British Field Marshal Bernard Montgomery told him: "You are lucky to have achieved Pakistan but luckier in inheriting Ahsan".

After partition, Jinnah said to Ahsan, "Do you know, I never expected to see Pakistan in my lifetime. We have to be very grateful to God for what we have achieved." Jinnah was said to have relied on Ahsan and on the latter's promotion to Lieutenant Commander and return to sea, the parting was described as not easy.

Acting Lieutenant Commander Ahsan was appointed as the Executive officer of PNS Tippu Sultan on 30 September 1949, under Commanding Officer P. S. Evans. He was the naval aide-de-camp to Governor General Nazimuddin in 1950. He was appointed Deputy Chief of Naval Staff (Operations) in the rank of Acting Commander on 1 January 1951 and on 28 September 1952. In March 1951, Ahsan was selected to command H.M.P.S. Tughril, an 1,800-ton destroyer with a complement of 14 officers and 220 ratings, that was the first RPN warship to be fully manned by Pakistani officers and sailors.

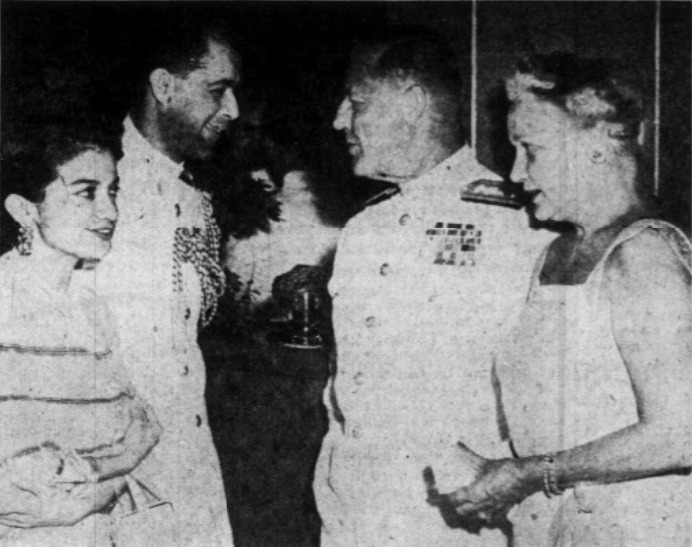
Captain Ahsan at the Commissioned Officers' Mess, Naval Base, with his wife (left), Rear Admiral I. N. Kiland, Commandant of the Fifth Naval District, and Mrs. Kiland on September 6, 1955.

In December 1952, the Inter-Services Intelligence (ISI) requested that service headquarters gather and report the reactions of military personnel to the Basic Principles Committee report. In response, Naval Intelligence commander Ahsan relayed their concerns.

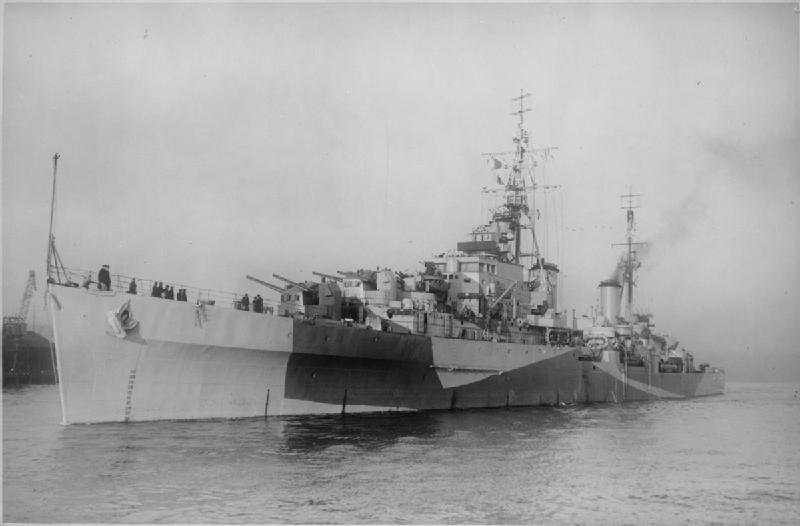
HMS Diadem on the River Tyne in 1944, before its transfer to Pakistan as PNS Babur, which Ahsan commanded from 1957.

From 1 January 1952 to 12 June 1955, Ahsan served as Principal Staff Officer at the Naval Headquarters. He was the naval attaché to the Embassy of Pakistan, Washington, D.C. from 5 August 1955 to 30 July 1956. In recognition of his service, he was awarded the Legion of Merit (degree of officer) for "exceptionally meritorious conduct." in 1958.

He was appointed the first commanding officer of PNS Babur, formerly the Royal Navy cruiser HMS Diadem, when the cruiser was recommissioned by the Pakistan Navy in July 1957. The cruiser arrived in Pakistan two months later, and Ahsan assumed command of a complement of 27 officers and 500 men.

He was appointed Chief of Staff of the Pakistan Navy with the rank of Commodore on 1 March 1959. He was appointed as the first Deputy Chief at the Military Planning Office of Southeast Asia Treaty Organization (SEATO), under Chief Major General John Wilton on 31 July 1960. Rear Admiral Ahsan succeeded him as Chief on 29 June 1962 and served until 30 June 1964.

Subsequently, Ahsan took over as the Chairman of the East Pakistan Inland Water Transport Authority from his predecessor Bakhteyar Husain in early 1964 and was promoted to the rank of full Rear Admiral on 17 August 1964. During the India–Pakistan war of 1965, over 100 Indian coastal vessels with valuable cargo were seized in East Pakistan on Ahsan's orders. He served until 1966.

==== Commander-in-Chief (1966–1969) ====
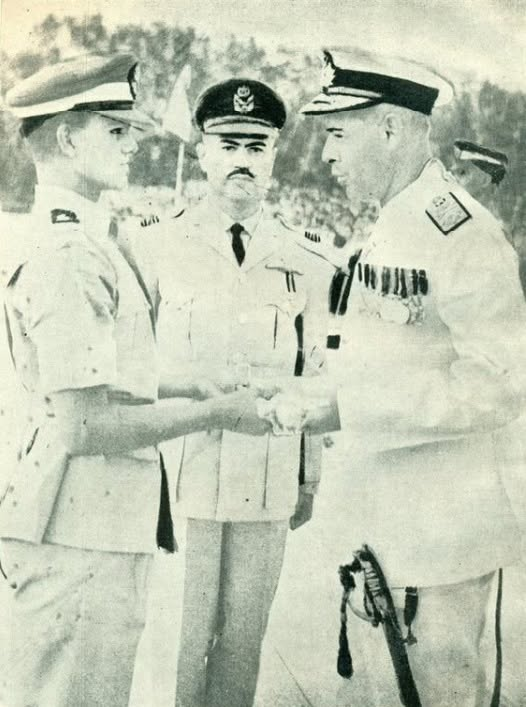
Cadet Ekram Azad receiving the Sword of Honour from Vice Admiral Ahsan at the Graduation Parade, PAF Academy, 1967

Following the appointment of Vice Admiral A. R. Khan, the former Commander-in-Chief of the Pakistan Navy, as Defence Minister in October 1966, President Ayub Khan appointed Rear Admiral Ahsan to succeed him. According to author Herbert Feldman, there were coordinated efforts to thwart Ahsan's appointment. Ahsan also served as the Chairman of the Board of Governors of Cadet College Petaro from 1966 to 1968. He was appointed as the Military Adviser for Pakistan to SEATO in February 1967 and was promoted to Vice Admiral sometime that year.

During his tenure, Vice Admiral Ahsan conducted surveys of areas west of the city of Karachi and along the Balochistan coast to identify potential sites for a second Pakistani port. Fond of sailing, Ahsan discovered the area of Phitti Creek which is east of Karachi while cruising the Arabian Sea. Impressed with the natural depth of its main channel, Ahsan established a "Phitti Creek Cell" in the Naval Headquarters in 1968. The Pakistan Navy paid the British Hydraulics Research Station close to £1,000 to conduct a naval survey of the area.

On 25 March 1969, General Yahya Khan succeeded Field Marshal Ayub Khan as President of Pakistan and appointed General Abdul Hamid Khan, Vice Admiral Ahsan, and Air Marshal Nur Khan as Deputy Chief Martial Law Administrators. From 5 April 1969 to 3 August 1969, Ahsan also served as Minister of the Planning Commission including Planning and Economic Affairs, Finance, Commerce, Industries and Natural Resources, Food and Agriculture, and Scientific and Technological Research divisions.

Vice Admiral Ahsan presented the 1969–70 budget for Pakistan on 28 June 1969, with the objective of economic growth and social welfare. He said that there was no alternative to maximising economic growth and said development would be meaningless unless its benefits were distributed widely and its costs shared fairly. Rs530 crores were allocated for public sector development with Rs40 crore specifically for social programs. It also introduced new taxes expected to generate an estimated Rs46.98 crores, significantly more than the Rs6.31 crores added in the previous year's budget. Public enterprises were also required to increase their profitability, while railway fares, freight charges, and electricity and water rates were increased.

=== Governor of East Pakistan (1969–1971) ===
In August 1969, President Yahya Khan assigned Vice Admiral Ahsan, now the governor-designate of East Pakistan, to begin negotiating a constitutional compromise acceptable to East and West Pakistan, and the military regime.

On 1 September 1969, Vice Admiral Ahsan was succeeded by Vice Admiral Muzaffar Hassan as Commander-in-Chief of the Navy. That evening, Ahsan was sworn in as Governor of East Pakistan at the Durbar Hall of the Governor House with the oath administered by Justice Salahuddin, a judge of the Dhaka High Court. According to several sources, Ahsan did not want to become governor.

Governor Vice Admiral Ahsan established a judicial commission on 5 November 1969, consisting of Justice Salahuddin Ahmed and Justice Maksum-ul-Hakim of the Dacca High Court, to investigate the causes of the violence between the Bengali-speaking people of East Pakistan and Urdu-speaking immigrants in the province following the Dhaka riots. The commission was also tasked with recommending measures to restore communal harmony and prevent similar tensions in the future.

On 14 February 1970, Governor Vice Admiral Ahsan promulgated the East Pakistan Water Pollution Control Ordinance, 1970, creating a comprehensive legal framework for preventing and controlling water pollution. In a staff report prepared for the United States Senate Committee on Public Works, Leland O. Graham praised the legislation as "skillfully drafted and sweepingly comprehensive." He noted its strong enforcement powers, broad regulatory authority, and clear accountability provisions. He opined that, if it was as legally sound as it "undoubtedly is", East Pakistan's western counterparts had little need for outside drafting talent.

Although Governor Abdul Monem Khan's administration (1962-1969) was unsuccessful in resolving the issue concerning whether the Dhaka Museum should continue to be part of Dhaka University or be converted to the level of a provincial government operated institution, Governor Ahsan took decisive action and established it as a provincial independent authority by promulgating the Dhaka Museum (Board of Trustees) Ordinance, 1970, on 22 April 1970. This Ordinance established the Museum as a separate authority and satisfied those who did not want it to be a government museum.

On 12 January 1971, the Jahangirnagar University was formally launched by its adjudicator, Vice Admiral Ahsan. In his speech, he said that the university was established not only to relieve the pressure on Dhaka University but also to improve the quality of education. Rather than serving as a technical training factory for producing technical personnel, he emphasised that the institution would be a breeding ground intended to cultivate ideals, values, national pride, and cultural heritage.

==== 1970 Bhola cyclone relief efforts ====
The catastrophic Bhola cyclone of November 12, 1970, claimed the lives of 300,000 to 500,000 people and contributed to the political alienation of East Pakistan. As a result of the scale of destruction, Admiral Ahsan took over relief operations on the islands of Bhola and Hatiya, setting up his headquarters in the disaster zone at Manpura Island, to personally oversee relief efforts. He requested that the Central Government provide the necessary assistance, including helicopters to speed up relief work. Aggrieved, Ahsan held a press conference and said: "We have already demanded so many army helicopters for relief but I never received one."

Lieutenant General A. A. K. Niazi, laid blame on the military leadership in East Pakistan for neglecting the victims of the cyclone, particularly Lieutenant General Sahibzada Yaqub Khan, who was Commander Eastern Command. Niazi claimed that while Ahsan was requesting for helicopters and manpower to assist in the relief operation, Yaqub was adamant on not providing troops. According to Niazi, as Yaqub stalled and President Yahya Khan procrastinated, relief teams from America and Britain arrived without Islamabad's knowledge, causing international embarrassment. This also brought bitterness among the Bengalis as Bengali politician Sheikh Mujibur Rahman condemned the government for lack of response to the tragedy, saying, "It took British soldiers to bury our dead."

American diplomat Archer Blood in his memoirs, The Cruel Birth of Bangladesh, wrote: "Ahsan was thought to be a well-informed and caring friend of the Bengalis, and his work in the aftermath of the cyclone was well known and greatly appreciated. In my opinion Governor Ahsan was the true hero of the disaster relief operation."

==== 1970 Pakistani general election ====
As Governor of East Pakistan, Vice Admiral Ahsan played a significant role prior to the December 1970 general election by accurately assessing the political landscape and maintaining close communication with Sheikh Mujibur Rahman and the Awami League. Author B. Z. Khasru wrote that Ahsan had earned the respect and confidence of the Awami League and the Bengali people. According to journalist G. S. Bhargava, Ahsan refused to rig the elections in the province, for which Bhutto never forgave Ahsan. Bhutto later referred to Ahsan as a "pliable tool in the hands of the Awami League."

Vice Admiral Ahsan predicted on 13 February 1970 that "Sheikh Mujibur Rahman seems sure bet to win coming elections in East Pakistan." His later recollections also suggest that he believed the Bengali leadership sought constitutional reform rather than secession. Ahsan was also convinced that President Yahya Khan, "fully intended to turn over power to the Awami League," after his visit to East Pakistan in January 1971, before changing his mind. Ahsan speculated that Zulfikar Ali Bhutto was the main figure who caused the president to reconsider his decision.

In discussions with U.S. envoy Sydney Sober on 16 August 1971, Ahsan said: "Prior to March at least, separation from Pakistan was not Mujib's intention". He also told the envoy that the only practical solution in the long run is political and the alternative would lead to the establishment of an independent state. He reiterated that a political solution would only be possible through the "rehabilitation and use of Sheikh Mujibur Rahman."

===== Opposition to Assembly postponement and subsequent military action =====
During a meeting on 22 February 1971 with high-level officials including Governor Ahsan, President General Yahya Khan revealed that he would be postponing the National Assembly session scheduled for 3 March. The session was intended to draft a new constitution and transfer power to elected representatives, specifically the Awami League led by Sheikh Mujibur Rehman, which won a majority in the 1970 general election. One reason cited for this postponement was the refusal of Pakistan Peoples Party leader Zulfikar Ali Bhutto to attend the session.

Admiral Ahsan strongly opposed any delay, warning President Yahya that if that were to happen, it would create immediate unrest in East Pakistan. He was supported by Lt Gen Rakhman Gul. He argued that both law enforcement and the East Pakistan Rifles were mostly composed of Bengalis sympathetic to the Awami League, who would neither have the ability or the willingness to control the situation. He believed that once protests spilled into the streets, things would spiral out of control and pose a risk to the state's unity.

The next morning, Admiral Ahsan called Major General Rao Farman Ali for a meeting. Ali recalled that Ahsan and General Sahabzada Yakub Khan [Yaqub] appeared to have been awake throughout the night after Yahya announced his decision. Ahsan subsequently sent Yahya Khan an urgent note warning this would eventually lead to the Indians becoming directly involved in East Pakistan.

On the night of February 25, Admiral Ahsan and Major General Rao Farman Ali traveled to Karachi to meet with Zulfikar Ali Bhutto to convey their concerns of a potential civil war. During the meeting, Bhutto downplayed their concerns and said a guerrilla war was not feasible. He referred to the Awami League as a bourgeois party which could not govern the country, just as similar parties had failed in the past, and believed it was even less capable of organising or sustaining such a war. After returning to Rawalpindi, they reported Bhutto's views to Yahya Khan who subsequently made the final decision to postpone the National Assembly session on March 1 and instructed Governor Ahsan to notify Mujib of the decision 24 hours in advance.

On 28 February, Ahsan called Sheikh Mujibur Rehman and his close advisers to his residence to inform them of President Yahya Khan's decision. According to Rao Farman Ali, who was also present, Mujib pleaded they give him a new date for the session and added, "Even now I can control some of my people." Ahsan sent an urgent telex to President Yahya Khan, saying: "I beg you even at this late hour to give a new date for the summoning of the Assembly and not to postpone it sine die, otherwise...we will have reached the point of no return."

===== Dismissal =====
In a statement broadcast over Radio Pakistan on 1 March 1971, President Yahya Khan said "with a heavy heart" that he had decided to postpone the session to a later date. According to The New York Times correspondent Sydney Schanberg, who was in Dacca, "scores were killed by West Pakistani troops stationed here" during demonstrations against the decision.

The media aired reports that Ahsan refused to open fire on citizens if they were to go on strike and was replaced with General Sahabzada Yaqub Khan, who resigned when his advice of a political settlement instead of a military solution were ignored. Similarly, Air Commodore Zafar Masud had also resigned when President Yahya Khan refused his advice to go for a political solution.

Major General Rao Farman Ali depicted Ahsan's removal as an abrupt and humiliating decision that reflected the political instability in East Pakistan. While Ahsan, Sahabzada Yakub Khan, and he were discussing the situation, the telephone rang and Ahsan took the call. He wrote: "It was General Peerzada who asked for Yakub," who then announced, "I am the Governor now". Ahsan said "Fine!", which was followed by silence.

Farman Ali argued that, "The removal of Ahsan left bad taste due to the manner it was done" and criticised Yakub's reaction, noting that after Ahsan began thinking out loud and planning to leave the Governor House, "Yakub did not say a word of consolation." Farman Ali wondered why President Yahya Khan disgraced Ahsan this way, as Ahsan "did not want to be Governor in the first place". Ali then questioned: "Is this the fate of people who serve their country with the greatest sincerity and devotion?"

On March 4, thousands of Bengalis protested by surrounding the Governor's residence and chanted "Admiral Ahsan Na Javey" (Admiral Ahsan, do not leave) which forced Ahsan to be evacuated via helicopter. According to Ali, Ahsan's entire staff wept as he was being evacuated.

== Public image ==
He is generally viewed favorably by contemporaries and later commentators, including British diplomat Cyril Stanley Pickard, Indian journalist Anthony Mascarenhas, Pakistani historian Suhail Zaheer Lari, civil servant Roedad Khan, and Indian Vice Admiral Nilakanta Krishnan, who praised his intelligence, integrity, fairness, and professionalism.

Brigadier Siddique Salik, described Admiral Ahsan as someone who had "the aloofness of a hermit, delicacy of a scholar and formality of a diplomat." These qualities, which would have been Ahsan's strong points elsewhere, were his weaknesses as Governor according to Salik.

In 1992, journalist Humayun Akhtar wrote that Admiral Ahsan, much like former East Pakistan Governor General Azam Khan, was "respected by all and sundry." He recalled that during the 1970 finals of the Aga Khan Gold Cup in Paltan Maidan when Admiral Ahsan walked onto the field for the prize-giving ceremony, the entire crowd gave him a standing ovation, an experience Akhtar described as "simply unbelievable." He further stated that Khan and Ahsan "did not go for popularity; they were firm and tough men but fair and just and meant business. They were honest: East Pakistanis loved them then and Bangladeshis still remember them with all fondness."

In a 2006 article for Desperdes, Bengali businessman Sultan Reza recalled that, while playing bridge at his cousin's house with Ahsan before the 1971 military crackdown, Ahsan, then Governor of East Pakistan, asked how many Bengalis would be willing to lay down their lives if the Pakistan Army attempted to rule the province by force. Reza believed that Ahsan advised President Yahya Khan against military action and resigned after Yahya rejected this advice.

== Later life ==
In 1972, Ahsan welcomed the formation of the War Enquiry Commission chaired by Chief Justice Hamoodur Rahman, which assessed Pakistan's political and military involvement in East Pakistan. He submitted a written statement to the commission, describing the military leadership's decision to launch a military operation in the eastern province after postponing the assembly session. He recalled that after arriving in Rawalpindi, he was alarmed by the "high tide of militarism" within the government. He wrote that he knew of "no military solution which could possibly solve whatever crisis was supposed to be impending" and argued that the decision to launch military action had been taken without consulting him as the Governor. He also described himself as the only non-Bengali who had to represent "the sentiments of seventy million Bengalis" to the Pakistani government.

Ahsan served as the Chairman of the Pakistan National Shipping Corporation from 22 April 1974 to 18 July 1976. He opened the first post-graduate course in computer science organised by the Institute of Marine Engineers at PNS Karsaz on 29 February 1976. In his speech, he said that the computer revolution was being regarded as more significant than the Industrial Revolution.

In July 1977, the Council of the Chartered Institute of Transport (CIT) approved the setting up of its Pakistan Centre. According to its Journal, this was due to Ahsan's efforts, which brought a group of men from various fields of transport onto a single platform, thus laying the foundation of the Pakistan Centre. He was also a Fellow of the Institute.

From 27 June 1978 to 9 June 1980, Ahsan served as the fourth Chairman of the Port Qasim Authority. During his tenure, Britain was the largest single investor in Port Qasim. He also wrote the foreword of the 1988 book, Navigation in port Qasim: A professional treatise, authored by retired Commander Syed Mazhar Husain and also wrote the foreword of General Attiqur Rahman's 1989 biography, "Back to the Pavilion".

As a friend of both Attiqur Rahman and Ahsan, Pakistani columnist Ardeshir Cowasjee had repeatedly urged them to write books about their experiences during the India–Pakistan war of 1971. He recalled that Ahsan refused, saying that if he were to write the truth as he knew it, "he would hurt many that were still living and many relatives of those that were dead." Cowasjee further said Ahsan remained adamant, despite their contentions that he was denying history.

== Death ==
Syed Mohammad Ahsan died on 4 August 1989 in Karachi at the age of 68. His funeral was held on 5 August and he was buried at the Naval Cemetery in Karachi. Ahsan's friend, Abbas Khaleeli (died 1994), former Chairman of EFU Insurance, was buried close to him.

== Legacy and commemorations ==
In the preface of his 1984 biography of Muhammad Ali Jinnah, Jinnah of Pakistan, American historian Stanley Wolpert wrote: "To Admiral S. M. Ahsan I am most warmly indebted for historic insights and generous hospitality."

On the day of his death in 1989, Prime Minister Benazir Bhutto arrived at Port Qasim to inaugurate the Ahsan Channel, the port's primary navigational route. During her speech, she said: "I am sorry to learn that Admiral Ahsan passed away on the eve of my arrival in Port Qasim. I believe he had gone on a sailing trip when he had sighted this area of Port Qasim. He had met with the then Prime Minister and explained to him that he knew and had seen this place and, according to Admiral Ahsan the then Prime Minister said within five minutes of hearing him: "Admiral Ahsan! You have the second port that the country is looking for".

Reporting on his death, the Pakistan & Gulf Economist said that Admiral Ahsan was known as one of the "noblest soldier-gentleman" and had devoted his life later life to human service. Having been a Trustee of Layton-Rehamatullah Benevolent Trust (LRBT), which was running charitable hospitals and dispensaries in Karachi and other areas of Sindh, he visited remote places such as Tando Bagho to see services being rendered by the Trust. Doctors serving the LRBT held him in highest esteem for his concern for "ailing and suffering humanity." Concluding the obituary, it said Pakistan had lost a "noble crusader" who was engaged in "healing the wounds of the poor and suffering fellow country-men."

PNS Ahsan, named after S. M. Ahsan, was commissioned by Admiral Yastur-ul-Haq Malik, the Chief of Naval Staff, on 30 October 1991. It was previously known as remote data station Mianwali.

Naval Aviator Retired Captain Harry Carter of the United States Navy in his 2012 autobiography, The Life and Loves of a United States Naval Aviator, wrote that Ahsan was a "legend in his own right".

== Dates of rank ==
Rank	Date
Vice Admiral	1967
Rear Admiral	17 August 1964
Commodore	1 March 1959
Captain	1951
Commander	1 July 1950 (acting)
Lieutenant commander	1949 (acting)
Lieutenant	1 April 1942
Sub Lieutenant	1 May 1941 (acting)
Midshipman	1 April 1940

== Awards and decorations ==
- Distinguished Service Cross (UK), 1943
- Medalha de Mérito Militar (Class 2)
- Atlantic Star
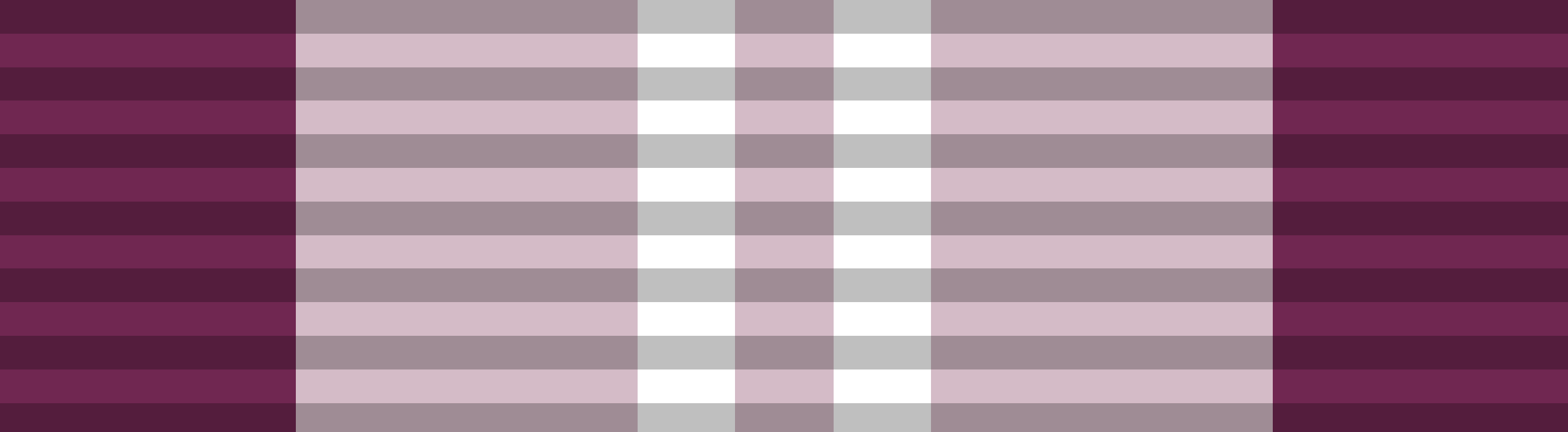
- Sitara-e-Quaid-e-Azam, 1958
- Legion of Merit, 1958
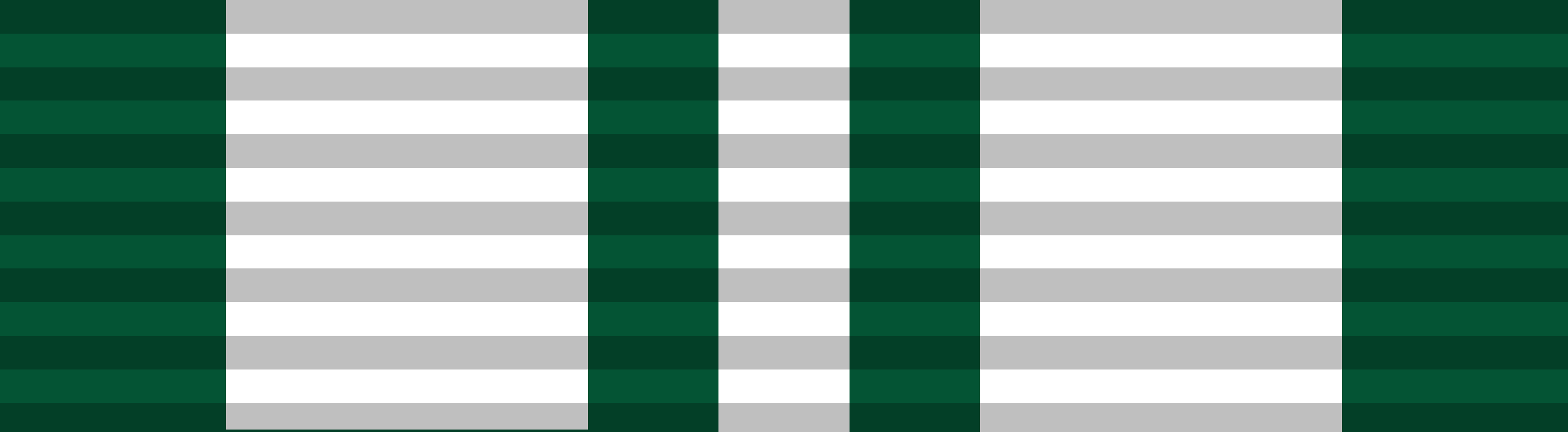
- Sitara-e-Pakistan, 1966
- Iranian Humayun Order
- Jordanian Hashemite Order

=== Legion of Merit Citation ===
At a ceremony in Karachi on 26 August 1958, Captain Ahsan was awarded the Legion of Merit (degree of officer). US Secretary of Defence Neil H. McElroy, who was in attendance, read the citation in front of an audience including Commander-in-Chief, Rear Admiral HMS Choudri:

CITATION
CAPT SYED MOHAMMAD AHSAN (PN/7)

"The Legion of Merit (degree of officer) has been awarded to Capt. Syed Mohammad Ahsan, Pakistan Navy for exceptionally meritorious conduct in the performance of outstanding services as Naval Attache to the Embassy of Pakistan in the United States from August, 1955, to July, 1956. Throughout this period, Capt. Ahsan discharged his responsibility with excellent judgment and diplomacy and co-operated wholeheartedly with the Department of the Navy on all occasions. Displaying a sincere friendship toward the United States and a thorough understanding of current international problems, he contributed materially to the strengthening of the bonds of amity existing between the navies of Pakistan and the United States."

== Notes ==
Military offices
Preceded by A. R. Khan	C-in-C of the Pakistan Navy; 1966 –1969	Succeeded by Muzaffar Hassan
Political offices
Preceded by Sahabzada Yaqub Khan	Governor of East Pakistan; 1969–1971	Succeeded by Sahabzada Yaqub Khan
Preceded by N M Uqaili	Finance Minister of Pakistan; 1969	Succeeded by Muzaffar Ali Khan Qizilbash
