= Goh Chok Tong =

Prime Minister of Singapore from 1990 to 2004

Goh Chok Tong SPMJ AC
- 吴作栋
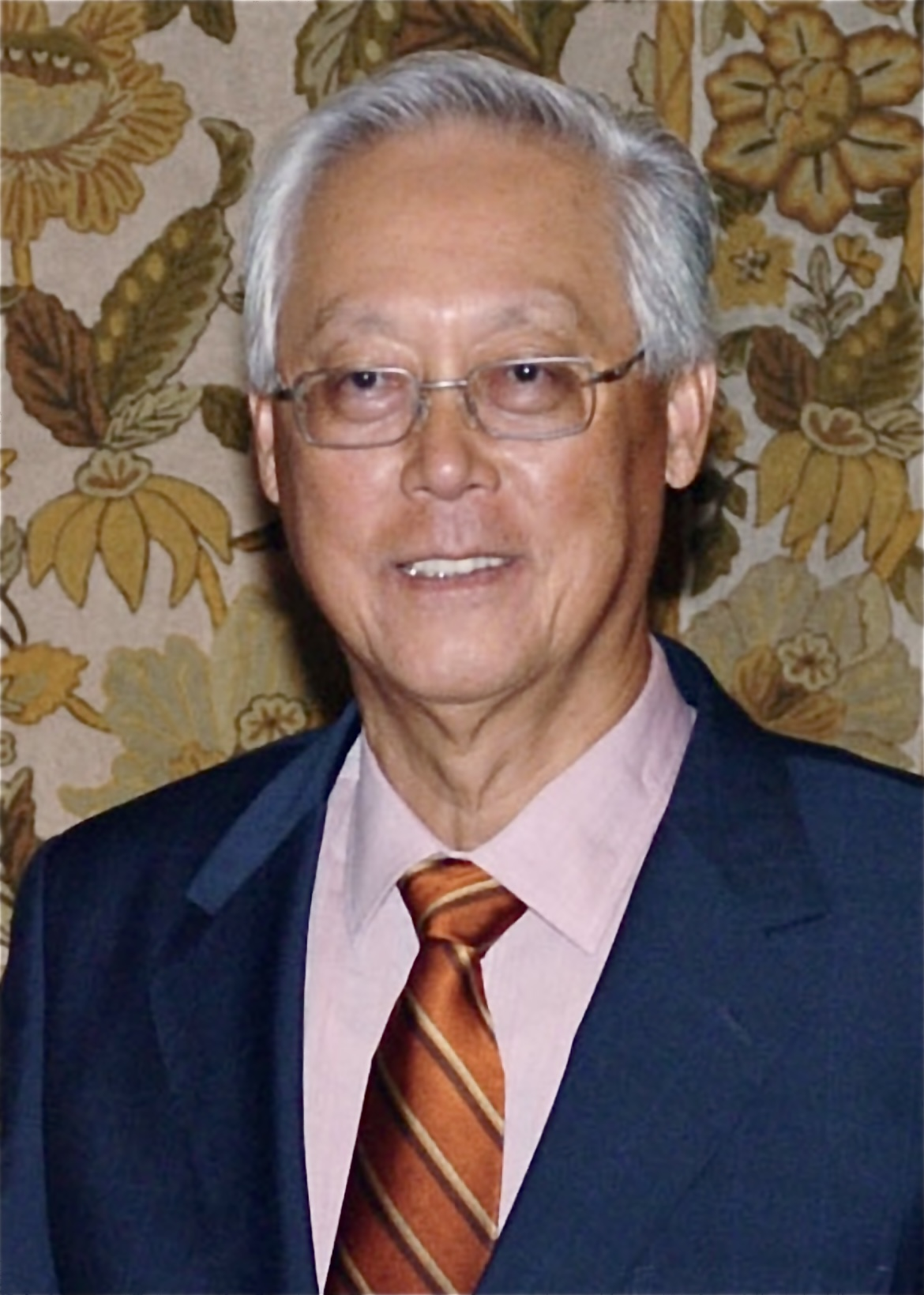
- Goh in 2008

2nd Prime Minister of Singapore
- In office 28 November 1990 – 12 August 2004
- President: Wee Kim Wee; Ong Teng Cheong; S. R. Nathan
- Deputy: Ong Teng Cheong; Lee Hsien Loong; Tony Tan
- Preceded by: Lee Kuan Yew
- Succeeded by: Lee Hsien Loong

Senior Minister of Singapore
- In office 12 August 2004 – 20 May 2011 Serving with S. Jayakumar (2009–2011)
- Preceded by: Lee Kuan Yew
- Succeeded by: Teo Chee Hean; Tharman Shanmugaratnam

Secretary-General of the People's Action Party
- In office 15 November 1992 – 6 November 2004
- Chairman: Ong Teng Cheong; Tony Tan
- Preceded by: Lee Kuan Yew
- Succeeded by: Lee Hsien Loong

Member of Parliament for Marine Parade
- In office 23 December 1976 – 23 June 2020
- Preceded by: Constituency established
- Succeeded by: PAP held
- Constituency: Marine Parade SMC (1976–1988); Marine Parade GRC (1988–2020)
Senior positions
Chairman of the Monetary Authority of Singapore
In office 20 August 2004 – 30 April 2011
Governor	Goh Chok Tong
Preceded by	Lee Hsien Loong
Succeeded by	Tharman Shanmugaratnam
Ministerial offices
Deputy Prime Minister of Singapore
In office 2 January 1985 – 28 November 1990 Serving with Ong Teng Cheong
Preceded by	Goh Keng Swee; S. Rajaratnam
Succeeded by	Lee Hsien Loong; Tony Tan
Minister for Defence
In office 1 June 1982 – 30 June 1991
Governor	Lee Kuan Yew; Himself
Preceded by	Howe Yoon Chong
Succeeded by	Yeo Ning Hong
Minister for Health
In office 6 January 1981 – 31 May 1982
Governor	Lee Kuan Yew
Preceded by	Toh Chin Chye
Succeeded by	Howe Yoon Chong
Minister for Trade and Industry
In office 15 March 1979 – 31 May 1981
Preceded by	Office established
Succeeded by	Tony Tan

Personal details
- Born: 20 May 1941 (age 85) Singapore, Strait Settlements
- Other political affiliations: People's Action Party (1976—2020)
- Spouse: Tan Choo Leng (m. 1965)
- Children: 2
- Education: University of Singapore (BA); Williams College (MA)

Goh Chok Tong (Note: Chinese: 吴作栋; Pe̍h-ōe-jī: Gô͘ Chok-tòng; pinyin: Wú Zuòdòng) (born 20 May 1941), also known by his initials GCT, is a Singaporean retired politician who served as the second prime minister of Singapore from 1990 to 2004 and as a senior minister of Singapore from 2004 to 2011. He served as the secretary-general of the People's Action Party (PAP) from 1992 to 2004 and was the member of Parliament (MP) for Marine Parade Single Member Constituency from 1976 to 1988, and Marine Parade Group Representation Constituency from 1988 to 2020.

Prior to his appointment as prime minister, he was the country's deputy prime minister, where he advocated for the Medisave, a savings scheme that allows Singaporeans to set aside part of their income into a Medisave account to meet future medical expenses. Goh also advocated for the Edusave Awards, a monetary reward for students who did well in school based on either their academic achievements or character to enshrine meritocracy.

Shortly before and during his tenure as prime minister, Goh proposed political reforms like the introduction of Non-Constituency Members of Parliament (NCMP), to allow more opposition into Parliament, Group Representation Constituencies (GRC), to make sure that minorities are represented in Parliament and Nominated Members of Parliament (NMP), to have independent opinions in Parliament since all NMPs are non-partisan. Goh assumed the responsibility of government in a carefully managed leadership transition. Goh enacted the Elected President scheme in 1991 as presidents before were appointed by Parliament. He also introduced the Vehicle Quota Scheme to limit the number of vehicles in the city-state.

On 12 August 2004, Goh was succeeded by Lee Hsien Loong, the eldest son of Singapore's first prime minister, Lee Kuan Yew, and was subsequently appointed as a senior minister in the Cabinet and chairman of the Monetary Authority of Singapore (MAS) between 2004 and 2011. He resigned from the Cabinet in 2011, and was given the honorary title of "Emeritus Senior Minister" by Lee. He stepped down as a Member of Parliament (MP) and retired from politics in 2020.

== Early life and education ==
Goh was born in Singapore on 20 May 1941 to Goh Kah Choon and Quah Kwee Hwa, who hailed from the Minnan region of Fujian province in China. He has Chinese Hokkien ancestry. Goh studied at Raffles Institution from 1955 to 1960. He was a very competitive swimmer in his younger days and was given the nickname "Bold".

Goh completed a Bachelor of Arts with first class honours degree in economics at the University of Singapore, and a Master of Arts degree in development economics at Williams College in 1967.

Upon his graduation, Goh returned to Singapore to work in the government. Goh's dream of getting a PhD was disrupted as the government would not transfer his bursary bond to the university, where he had signed on as a research fellow after graduation.

In 2015, Goh was awarded an honorary Doctor of Laws degree by his alma mater, the National University of Singapore, for his contributions to the country.

== Career ==
In 1969, Goh was seconded to the national shipping company Neptune Orient Lines (NOL) as the company's Planning and Projects Manager. His career advanced quickly and by 1973 he was the Managing Director. At NOL, Goh worked under the company's founder, Muhammad Jalaluddin Sayeed, with whom he maintained close ties.

== Political career ==
In the 1976 general election, Goh, then 35, was elected as Member of Parliament for Marine Parade SMC as a People's Action Party (PAP) candidate. He was appointed as a Senior Minister of State for Finance. In 1981, he was promoted to Minister for Trade and Industry and later served in other appointments including Minister for Health and Minister for Defence.

Goh was tasked to organise the 1981 Anson SMC by-election which was a pivotal event in shaping his political sensibilities. Despite having been passed over as first assistant secretary-general by Tony Tan, Goh was asked to his surprise by Lee Kuan Yew to lead and organise the by-election, ostensibly because of Goh's previous successful campaigns in organising the 1979 by-election at Anson SMC and the 1980 General Elections.

Early on in the campaigning for the 1981 Anson SMC by-election, a chasm of leadership emerged as volunteers and older activists for the previous MP Devan Nair departed along with the MP. The new PAP candidate was Pang Kim Hin, who had difficulties connecting to the electorate as he had a reputation of being a "rich man's son", as the nephew of Old Guard minister Lim Kan San. Despite being a three-cornered fight, it was apparent that the main opposition candidate was J. B. Jeyaretnam, who was a veteran opposition at the time, having previously came close in winning the seat at Telok Blangah Constituency, which is of close proximity to Anson. The rising costs of housing and upcoming public bus fares was a source of unhappiness among voters. PAP lost the Anson seat with a 37-point swing in just 10 months since the last general election, marking the first time since Independence that PAP had lost a seat. This watershed event prompted rumours within the PAP of the end of Goh's political career. While Lee Kuan Yew was worried that Goh lacked political sensitivity towards the electorate, as he failed to detect the possible loss of the seat and remained overconfident until very close to polling day, he did not blame Goh for the loss, as he reflected in his memoir From Third World to First.

In 1985, Goh became deputy prime minister and began to assume the responsibility of the government in a carefully managed leadership transition. According to Lee Kuan Yew, his preferred successor was Tony Tan. However, Goh was selected by the second generation of PAP leaders that included Tony Tan and Ong Teng Cheong; Lee accepted their decision. However, during the 1988 National Day Rally, Lee Kuan Yew publicly discussed his preferred choice of successor to the nation – ranking Goh as his second below Tony Tan, and while praising his 'faster mind', criticized Goh's indecisiveness and softer and consultative approach to leadership. This led to Goh feeling humiliated and astonished, as he recounted in his 2018 memoir, Tall Order: The Goh Chok Tong Story.

=== Prime minister ===
On 28 November 1990, Goh succeeded Lee Kuan Yew and became the second prime minister of Singapore. During the first year of Goh's premiership, Lee remained as secretary-general of the PAP. Lee also remained an influential member of Goh's Cabinet, holding the post of senior minister. The 1991 general elections, the first electoral test for Goh, led to the party winning 61% of the popular vote, the all-time low for PAP since independence. Because of the drop in share of the popular vote, and losing an unprecedented four seats in Parliament to the opposition, Goh had to quell rumours about his potential resignation to the international news media. In 1992, Lee handed over the post of secretary-general of the People's Action Party (PAP) to Goh, successfully completing the leadership transition.

Goh's deputy prime ministers Lee Hsien Loong and Ong Teng Cheong were both diagnosed with cancer in 1992, prompting the prime minister to call a by-election in his own constituency of Marine Parade in 1992, just over a year after the 1991 elections, citing the need for 'political self-renewal' and to get 'ministerial calibre' people to join the government. By calling the by-election, Goh became the first prime minister of Singapore to vacate his seat to contest a by-election. The vacation also produced a real risk of Goh losing the premiership in the event the PAP lost. Teo Chee Hean, who was one of the core leaders of the third generation of members of PAP and a senior minister up till May 2025, was one of the new politicians brought in to contest in the by-election.. The PAP retained Marine Parade GRC with 72.9% of the popular vote, allowing Goh to continue on as prime minister, eventually for the next decade.

As prime minister, Goh promised a more open-minded and consultative style of leadership than that of his predecessor. This greater openness extended also to the socio-economic spheres of life, for instance, in his support for the rise of "little bohemias" in Singapore, enclaves where more creativity and entrepreneurship could thrive.

Goh's administration introduced several major policies and policy institutions, including:

- Medisave
- Non-Constituency Members of Parliament
- Government Parliamentary Committees
- Group Representation Constituency
- Nominated Members of Parliament
- Vehicle Quota Scheme
- Elected President
- Singapore 21

During the period under Goh's administration, Singapore has experienced several crises, such as the aircraft hijack of Singapore Airlines Flight 117 in 1991, the Asian financial crisis in 1997 and 1998, threats of terrorism in 2001 including Singaporean victims of the 9/11 attacks in New York City by Al-Qaeda and the Singapore embassies attack plot by Jemaah Islamiyah, the 2001–2003 economic recession, 2003 SARS outbreak, and other events.

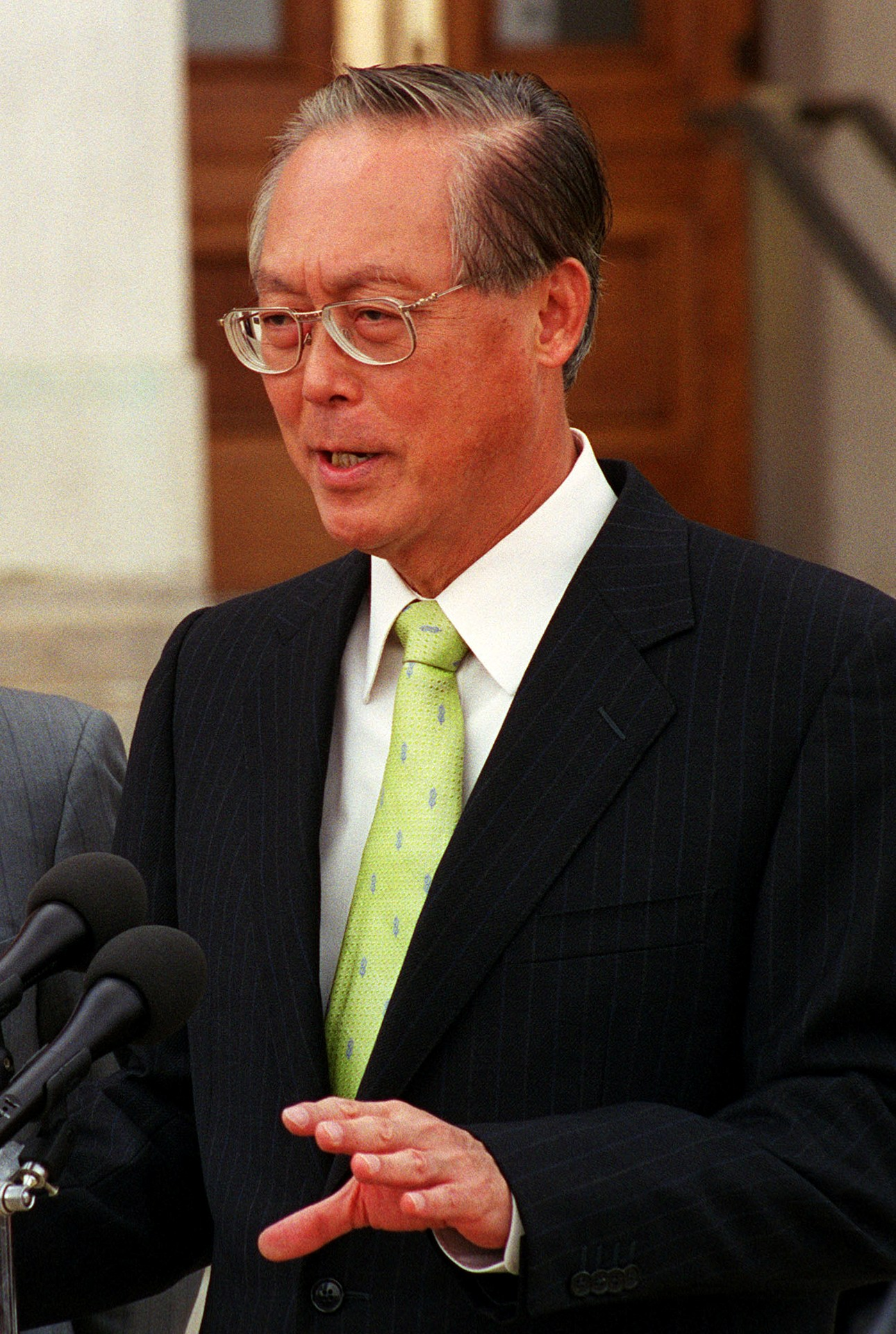
Goh Chok Tong in 2001.

Goh's access to Bill Clinton's White House was blocked because of the Michael Fay incident; it did not deter Goh from reaching out to the US President to pitch his idea for a free trade agreement (FTA) between Singapore and the US, as he did not believe Clinton to be aware of the diplomatic freeze. With the help of American businessman Joe Ford, Goh managed to reached out to President Clinton during the 1997 APEC summit, where he played golf with Clinton, ending the diplomatic freeze.

In September 1998, Goh had a meeting with Clinton in the White House and agreed to contribute to the Korean Peninsula Energy Development Organization which helped build strong ties between the two Koreas. The considerable improvement in this bilateral relationship had great impact on Singapore's economic recovery from the Asian Financial Crisis as several trade negotiations, part of "The Millennium Round", failed during the 1999 Seattle WTO protests and Doha Round. As international trade was three times Singapore's GDP at that time, securing trade treaties was paramount to Singapore's economic survival, with the US as its most desired trading partner. By riding on the improved relations with the Clinton administration, Goh personally reached out to President Clinton during the annual summit at Brunei in November 2000, near the end of Clinton's second term of his presidency. After a midnight golf session with Clinton after the banquet, Goh successfully convinced Clinton on a Singapore-USA FTA, with Clinton suggesting an FTA similar to the US-Jordan FTA. The FTA with the USA was eventually signed in 2003, and it was the USA's first FTA with an Asian country, with Goh exalting this FTA as the "crown jewel" of Singapore's international trade.

As secretary-general, Goh led the PAP to three general election victories in 1991, 1997, and 2001, in which the party won 61%, 65% and 75% of the votes respectively. After the 2001 general election, Goh indicated that he would step down as prime minister after leading the country out of the recession.

During an interview with Time magazine in July 2003, Goh surprised Singaporeans by announcing that his government was openly employing homosexuals, even in sensitive jobs, despite homosexual acts remaining illegal under Section 377A of the Penal Code.

=== Senior minister ===
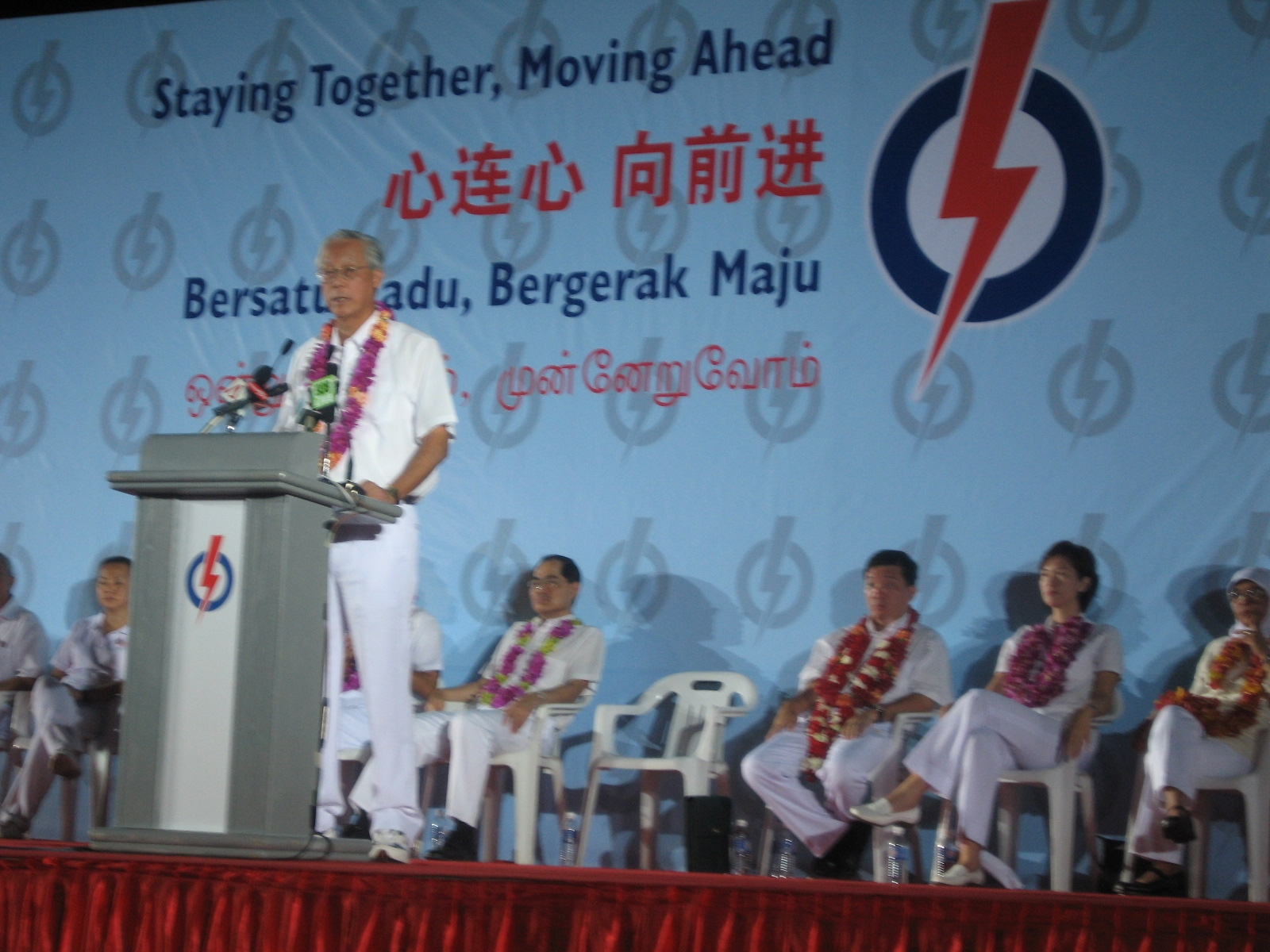
Goh Chok Tong speaking at a rally at Potong Pasir during the 2006 general election. The banner behind him shows the campaign manifesto of the People's Action Party, "Staying Together, Moving Ahead".

In October 2003, Goh announced that he would step down when the economy recovered from a downturn that was caused by the SARS. Eventually on 12 August 2004, Goh stepped down as prime minister and held a new position as Senior Minister in the Cabinet of his successor, Lee Hsien Loong. On 20 August 2004, Goh assumed the position of Chairman of the Monetary Authority of Singapore. After a number of threats of terrorism in Singapore, Goh met local Islamic religious leaders in 2004 and made a visit to Iran, where he met Iranian president Mohammad Khatami and visited local mosques.

Goh subsequently visited other Middle Eastern countries as Senior Minister, with a view to improving diplomatic relationships and thus gaining wider opportunities for Singaporean businesses, especially in the United Arab Emirates, Qatar and Kuwait.

On 1 February 2005, Goh was appointed an honorary Companion of the Order of Australia, Australia's highest civilian honour, "for eminent service to Australia-Singapore relations".

On 19 May 2005, Goh signed a Double Taxation Avoidance Agreement with Israel's Finance Minister Benjamin Netanyahu on a visit to Israel, superseding the agreement signed in 1971. Improvements in the agreement include enhancements to the withholding tax rate on interest income, which was reduced from 15% to 7%. This would benefit Singaporean businessmen with investments in Israel and vice versa, by ensuring they are not taxed twice.

Goh is a founding patron for the Institute of Policy Studies, a government think tank.

In the 2006 general election, Goh was tasked to help the PAP win back the two opposition wards of Hougang and Potong Pasir. However, he was unsuccessful in this task, as Low Thia Khiang and Chiam See Tong retained their respective wards.

In 2006, Goh was briefly considered for the job of United Nations Secretary-General but he lost out and the job eventually went to Ban Ki-moon.

In 2008, Goh was invited to join the InterAction Council of Former Heads of State and Government, an independent international organisation of former world leaders.

On 24 January 2011, Goh announced that he would continue to seek re-election to Parliament at the 2011 general election. Over the following months, he progressively released snippets prior to the election on the importance of grooming a successor who could be part of the fourth generation PAP leadership to helm Marine Parade GRC in the long run.

=== Emeritus senior minister ===
After the 2011 general election in which the opposition made unprecedented gains by winning a group representative constituency in (Aljunied), Goh and Lee Kuan Yew announced that they were retiring from the Cabinet in order to give Prime Minister Lee Hsien Loong and the rest of his team a clean slate from which they can make a fresh start in the new parliamentary term.

On 18 May 2011, Lee Hsien Loong announced that Goh was to be appointed a senior adviser to the Monetary Authority of Singapore, and would be given the honorary title of "Emeritus Senior Minister".

On 24 June 2011, Goh was awarded the Grand Cordon of the Order of the Rising Sun by the Japanese government.

On 4 May 2012, Goh was appointed as Patron for Advancement of the Singapore University of Technology and Design.

In the 2015 general election, Goh ran for re-election in Marine Parade GRC led by Tan Chuan-Jin and was reelected with 64.07% of the vote against Workers' Party team led by ex-NCMP Yee Jenn Jong.

In 2018, Goh's first volume authorised biography book titled Tall Order: The Goh Chok Tong Story was published. It details Goh's life from his childhood to until he took office as Singapore's second prime minister in 1990.

In an interview in 2019, Goh stated that he believed a 75% to 80% majority in Parliament, in the future, would constitute a 'strong mandate' for the Singapore government. In the same interview, he noted that he does not believe the electoral system needed any further tweaking.

On 4 August 2019, Goh made a Facebook post stating that he felt saddened by how his long-time friend, former PAP politician Tan Cheng Bock, had "lost his way" by forming a new political party, Progress Singapore Party (PSP), to contest in the next general election.

On 25 June 2020, Goh made a Facebook post announcing his retirement as a Member of Parliament for Marine Parade GRC after 44 years of service and will therefore retire from politics and was replaced by newcomer Tan See Leng.

A second volume of his biography titled Standing Tall: The Goh Chok Tong Years was released in April 2021 to mark his 80th birthday. The sequel consists of the 14 years which Goh was the Prime Minister of Singapore.

== Honours ==
- Malaysia:
  - Johor:
    - Honorary Grand Commander of the Order of the Crown of Johor (SPMJ) - Dato' (11 May 1991)
- Australia:
  - Honorary Companion of the Order of Australia (AC) (1 February 2005)
- Japan:
  - Grand Cordon of the Order of the Rising Sun (24 June 2011)

== Personal life ==
Goh is married to Tan Choo Leng and they have a son and a daughter, who are twins. Their son, Goh Jin Hian, was the former chief executive of New Silkroutes Group Limited, and in September 2023, was charged with false trading offences. Their daughter, Goh Jin Theng, lives in London with her husband. In his biography Standing Tall, Goh described himself as having no religion; he was brought up with traditional Chinese religions and "nominally practise ancestor worship". His wife is a Tibetan Buddhist while both his children are Methodist Christians.

In December 2020, Goh stated in a Facebook post that he would be undergoing four weeks of radiotherapy following the removal of a lump in his larynx, in order to ensure that all cancer cells are eliminated. It was the latest in a series of health issues faced by Goh in recent years. In 2021, while discussing his health during retirement, Goh shared that he aims to live until "at least 93 years of age", drawing a parallel to his Malaysian counterpart Mahathir Mohamad who was that exact age when he took office in 2018.

Standing at 1.9 m (6 ft 3 in), Goh is known for his tall stature, which is often alluded to in his biographies.

== Legacy ==
Having served as prime minister between the Lee Kuan Yew and Lee Hsien Loong eras, Goh has often been referred to in Singaporean political jokes as part of the trinity of "father, son, and the holy Goh".

In October 2014, the Madame Tussauds Singapore museum unveiled a wax figure of Goh. At its opening, Goh posed for pictures with his statue.

The Goh Chok Tong Enable Awards by Mediacorp Enable Fund is named after him.

== Bibliography ==
- Impressions of the Goh Chok Tong Years in Singapore by Bridget Welsh, James Chin, Arun Mahizhnan and Tan Tarn How (Editors), Singapore: NUS Press, 2009.
- Brand Singapore: How Nation Branding Built Asia's Leading Global City by Koh, Buck Song. Marshall Cavendish, Singapore, 2011. ISBN 978-981-4328-15-9.
- Article on civil society in the Goh Chok Tong era – "What plants will grow under the tembusu tree?" by Koh Buck Song, The Straits Times 9 May 1998.
- Tall Order by Shing Huei Peh, Singapore: World Scientific, 2018.
- Yap, Sonny; Lim, Richard; Leong, Weng K. (2010). Men in White: The Untold Story of Singapore's Ruling Political Party. Straits Times Press. ISBN 9789814266512.

Political offices
Preceded by New Post	Senior Minister of State for Finance; 1977–1979	Succeeded by S. Dhanabalan
Preceded by new post	Minister for Trade and Industry; 1979–1981	Succeeded by Tony Tan
Preceded by Toh Chin Chye	Minister for Health; 1981–1982	Succeeded by Howe Yoon Chong
Preceded by Howe Yoon Chong	Minister for Defence; 1982–1991	Succeeded by Yeo Ning Hong
Preceded by Goh Keng Swee	Deputy Prime Minister of Singapore; 1985–1990	Succeeded by Lee Hsien Loong
Preceded by Lee Kuan Yew	Prime Minister of Singapore; 28 November 1990 – 12 August 2004	Succeeded by Lee Hsien Loong
Preceded by Lee Kuan Yew	Senior Minister; 12 August 2004 – 21 May 2011; Served alongside: S. Jayakumar	Vacant Title next held by Teo Chee Hean; Tharman Shanmugaratnam; 2019
Parliament of Singapore
New constituency	Member of Parliament for Marine Parade; 1976–1988	Constituency abolished
New constituency	Member of Parliament for Marine Parade GRC (Marine Parade); 1988–2020	Succeeded by Tan See Leng
Party political offices
Preceded by Lee Kuan Yew	Secretary General of People's Action Party; 1992–2004	Succeeded by Lee Hsien Loong
Diplomatic posts
Preceded by Corazon Aquino	Chairperson of ASEAN; 1992	Succeeded by Banharn Silpa-archa
