= 1969 Dhaka riots =

Series of communal riots in East Pakistan

Dhaka Riots
- Location: Dacca, East Pakistan, Pakistan
- Date: 1 November – 6 November 1969 (UTC+6)
- Target: Bengalis, Biharis and Punjabi Muslims
- Attack type: Riot
- Deaths: 12
- Injuries: 110
- Perpetrators: Bengali mobs, pro-West Pakistani opportunistic groups
- Motive: Expulsion of non-Bengali Muslims from East Pakistan

The 1969 Dhaka riots were a series of disturbances that took place over five days as a consequence of riots between Bengalis and non-Bengali Muhajirs in November 1969. The disturbances began on 1 November during a strike called by the Muhajirs in Dacca, the capital of East Pakistan (present-day Dhaka, Bangladesh).

In order to stop the riots, the provincial government deployed the state military and the East Pakistan Rifles and enforced curfew. However, after five days, the riots were subdued through the efforts of people. These disturbances had a lasting impact on relations between Bengalis and non-Bengalis in East Pakistan, traces of which can be observed during the Liberation War of 1971.

== Background ==
During the colonial period, communal riots were common in India, and riots frequently occurred among religious communities in British-ruled Bengal. However, following the partition of India in 1947 and the creation of Pakistan, religious riots declined significantly. As a result of independence, the province of Bengal was divided, and East Bengal (later East Pakistan) became part of the new state. The partition led to the migration of Muhajirs from West Bengal and Bihar to East Bengal, the majority of whom were Biharis. However, during the Bengali Language Movement of the 1950s, which sought to establish Bengali as a state language of Pakistan, the issue of disparity between the eastern and western wings came to the forefront among Bengalis, the majority of the province. Since political power in Pakistan was controlled from the western wing, hostility gradually developed between Bengali and non-Bengali Muslims.

The Bengali middle class began to view the exploiters as Urdu-speaking and West Pakistani. On the other hand, the Urdu-speaking Muhajirs residing in East Bengal came to regard Bengalis who supported the Bengali Language Movement as enemies of Islam, as Urdu was perceived by them as the language of Islamic literature and culture. As a result, non-Bengali Muhajirs became socially isolated from East Pakistani society. In March 1969, following the mass uprising of 1969, Pakistan's president Ayub Khan resigned, and Yahya Khan assumed state power. He promised to allow the formation of a new constitution and a new government through elections based on adult franchise. On 1 November 1969, in the East Pakistani capital Dacca's Mirpur (present-day Dhaka, Bangladesh), a group of people attempted to forcibly shut down shops and block roads in order to compel observance of a strike demanding the supply of voter registration forms in the Urdu language.

== Riots ==
According to a statement by the government of East Pakistan, when police attempted to break road blockades and obstruct the activities of strike enforcers, the situation escalated and the strike turned violent. Following the clashes, the spread of rumors led to riots breaking out in several parts of Dacca. Forty police officers injured in the riots were admitted to hospitals. The total number of injured was 71, and six people were killed. After the incidents, the East Pakistan Rifles (EPR) and the Pakistan Army were deployed in the affected areas. The provincial government imposed a curfew on streets and roads in Dacca and Narayanganj until 7:00 a.m. the following morning.

As the riots continued the next day, one was killed and 19 were injured in Dacca. By noon, the situation further deteriorated, and riots occurred in Dacca's Mirpur, Hazaribagh, Rayerbazar, and Kamalapur. At New Market, a petrol pump and vehicles were set on fire. To bring the situation under control, the army had to open fire. From 2:00 p.m., a curfew was imposed in Dacca and Narayanganj for 16 hours.

In 3 November, two non-Bengali non-commissioned officers of the army were stabbed to death at New Market. During the riots, an individual was dragged off a bus at the area and beaten by a group of mob, but was rescued by the EPR. At night, when approximately 200 armed men attempted to enter Mohammadpur by boat from outside the city, several people were injured by gunfire from patrolling army personnel. On that day, a total of 13 people were injured, one of whom later died while undergoing treatment.

In 4 November, one person was killed and six were injured. The government reported that a total of 11 people were arrested over three days during the riots. The provincial administration reimposed a curfew for ten hours. By 5 November, although the situation had largely returned to normal, one person was killed and another injured in an explosion in Mohammadpur. On the same day, a curfew was enforced for ten hours in Mirpur and the areas under the police station of Tejgaon.

According to historian Badruddin Umar, the riots were primarily instigated by a faction of the East Pakistan Awami League (EPAL), which sought to expel non-Bengali Muhajirs from East Pakistan in order to gain political and economic advantage. Alongside Bengali mobs, opportunistic and unscrupulous groups aligned with West Pakistan also participated in the riots. Umar stated that a significant portion of the casualties in Mohammadpur, were non-Bengalis.

== Aftermath ==
=== Reactions ===
As soon as the riots began, various political parties across the country issued statements in response. In 1 November, Shah Azizur Rahman, deputy leader of the opposition in the recently dissolved National Assembly of Pakistan, called on the public to refrain from responding to provocations and to work toward restoring peace. Muzaffar Ahmed, president of the East Pakistan branch of the National Awami Party (Wali) (NAPW), urged the maintenance of unity, peace, and discipline. In addition, Nuruzzaman, chairman of the East Pakistan branch of the Pakistan Peoples Party (PPP), demanded a judicial inquiry into the riots. Nurul Amin, president of the Pakistan Democratic Party (PDP), expressed his willingness to take action to prevent riots at any cost. In 2 November, Siddique Ahmad, president of the Nizam-e-Islam Party (NIP), condemned the riot incidents.

In 3 November, provincial governor Syed Mohammad Ahsan visited the riot-affected areas and appealed to the public to work toward restoring peace at any cost. On the same day, responding by telephone from London, Sheikh Mujibur Rahman, president of the All-Pakistan Awami League (AL), expressed sorrow over the riots and stated that they had been instigated with the aim of halting the upcoming elections. In a speech delivered in 4 November, Abdul Hamid Khan Bhashani, chairman of the National Awami Party (Bhashani) (NAPB), held reactionary forces responsible for inciting the riots, and additionally blamed the American Central Intelligence Agency (CIA), the government of India, and the Jamaat-e-Islami Pakistan (JI). President Yahya Khan expressed grief over the loss of life during the riots. In 7 November, Mostafa Jamal Haider, a member of the central committee of the East Pakistan Students' Union (EPSU), stated at a meeting that "anti-people reactionary elements" were responsible for the riots.

=== Results ===
In 2 November, the provincial governor held multiple meetings with newspaper editors, political leaders, and senior administrative officials regarding the situation. On 4 November, peace committees were formed in several parts of the city to prevent further riots. In 5 November, the government of East Pakistan formed an inquiry commission into the riot incidents, appointing East Pakistan High Court judges Salahuddin Ahmed and Maksum-ul-Hakim as its members. By 6 November, due to the efforts of political figures, student leaders, and various organizations, the situation in Dacca returned to normal and the disturbances came to an end. To prevent further riots, a 49-member civic committee was formed in East Pakistan, headed by poet Sufia Kamal.

A case was filed at the police station of Lalbagh accusing four individuals of murdering two non-commissioned officers. Although the accused AL leader Nurul Islam Talukdar, chairman of New Paltan Union Council, East Pakistan Students' League (EPSL) leader Mostafa Mohsin Montu, and his brother Selim Jahan were arrested, Khasru, another EPSL leader, could not be apprehended as he was hiding in the rooftop water tank of Sir Iqbal Hall (present-day Shaheed Sergeant Zahurul Haq Hall) of the University of Dacca. Under the verdict of the military court in Dacca, all except Talukdar were sentenced to 14 years of imprisonment.

The riots were confined solely to Dacca and had a negative impact on relations between Bengalis and non-Bengali Muhajirs. As a result, during the Bangladesh Liberation War in 1971, relations between the two communities in the province reached their lowest point, and hostility between them intensified to an extreme level.
