= Pakistan–Singapore relations =

- Pakistan: Singapore

Pakistan–Singapore relations are the bilateral relations between Pakistan and Singapore. Singapore maintains a consulate general in Karachi, Pakistan, and Pakistan has a High Commission in Singapore. Both countries are members of the Commonwealth of Nations.

== History ==
Diplomatic relations between the two countries were established on 17 August 1966.

50 years of diplomatic relations were celebrated in 2016.

== Political relations ==
Pakistan considers Singapore, "a sincere friend of Pakistan". Singapore Prime Minister Lee Hsien Loong has also called Pakistan a friend of Singapore.

== Humanitarian assistance ==
Singapore humanitarian cooperation with Pakistan dates back as early as 1970 when the Bhola cyclone struck East Pakistan. Singapore dispatched a forty-five member Singapore Armed Forces (SAF) Medical Mission to East Pakistan. During this trip, SAF provided medical supplies worth about $50,000, while 15 tons of canned food were forwarded to local relief centres for distribution to the victims.

During the 2010 Pakistan floods, the government of Singapore provided Pakistan aid of up to US$100,000 whereas Singapore charity organisation Mercy Relief collected charity worth up to US$500,000. Charis Singapore, a humanitarian organization of the Catholic Church, contributed US$50,000, 800 water filters; 10 000 blankets to the flood victims of Pakistan. Singapore has also been instrumental in helping Pakistan during the 2005 Kashmir earthquake.

== Economic relations ==
Singapore is an important trade partner with Pakistan. Trade volume between the 2 countries is around US$2.5 billion. Singapore exported goods worth US$2.124 billion compared to US$228 million imports from Pakistan.

Singapore is also one of the largest investors in Pakistan. with investment around US$2 billion. Singapore government investment arm Temasek Holdings acquired majority share of PICIC for US$339 million in June 2007 through NIB Bank, a subsidiary of Temasek Holdings. Singapore SingTel purchased a 30% stake in Pakistan Warid Telecom for US$758 million in June 2007.

Pakistani companies having branch in Singapore include Pakistan International Airlines and HBL Pakistan.

Pakistan was also instrumental in developing the Singaporean maritime industry. At the request of the Singaporean Government, Pakistan nominated Captain Muhammad Jalaluddin Sayeed to Singapore, where he was the founding director of the NOL shipping company.

== Gwadar Port controversy ==
The government of Pakistan initially awarded port operation responsibilities of Gwadar Port to Port of Singapore (PSA), a subsidiary of the government of Singapore, in Feb 2007 for 40 years, expecting to take advantage of PSA expertise in maritime operation and increase trade. PSA operates 22 ports in 11 countries. However so far PSA has failed to make the port fully functional, bring in trade or make the necessary investment of US$525 million over the course of 5 years it initially agreed, which is now raising concerns amongst Pakistani and Chinese governments as the Gwadar Port was largely funded by the Chinese government. China provided up to US$198 million of the total US$248 million funding for phase one of the project.

Chinese government interest to make Gwadar Port fully functional has been to gain a wider maritime supply route, especially for oil tanker shipment from Gulf, as shipment supply from Gwadar port can reach Eastern China through the Karakoram Highway connecting China and Pakistan, or from a possible pipeline connecting Gwadar and Kashgar. Constructing a Kashgar-Gwadar railway line is also being considered. Gwadar is just 400 km from the Strait of Hormuz, a major world oil supply line, and 1,500 km from Kashgar, China. This means oil shipment only need to travel a total distance of 2,000 km from the Strait of Hormuz to China, as opposed to 12,000 km of maritime distance from the Strait of Hormuz to the Port of Shanghai via the Strait of Malacca.

PSA has so far declined to make any press comment on this controversy. A fully operational Gwadar port will expand China's maritime trade links, possible naval presence in the Indian Ocean and possibly also reduce maritime volume heading towards China across the Malacca and Singapore. The government of Balochistan has initiated a challenge of port operation to PSA in Pakistan's Supreme Court. Pakistan chief of naval staff Admiral Noman Bashir, has called for the cancellation of the port operation agreement with PSA, and suggested passing the operations to the Chinese government.

== Official visits ==
=== Political ===
In November 2010, Pakistani Foreign Minister, Makhdoom Shah Mahmood Qureshi paid a 3-day official visit to Singapore on the invitation of Singaporean Foreign Minister George Yeo. In July 2007, 10 Senior Officials from the Government of Punjab, Pakistan, visited Civil Service College in Singapore, at the invitation of Singapore's Head of Civil Service, Mr Peter Ho. Pakistan former PM Shauket Aziz visited Singapore in May 2005, and was received by Singaporean PM Lee Hsien Loong.

=== Military ===
In February 2005, Pakistani Joint Chiefs of Staff Committee General Ehsan ul Haq made a three-day introductory visit to Singapore at the invitation of Singaporean Chief of Defence Force Lieutenant-General Ng Yat Chung, and meet with Singaporean Minister for Defence Teo Chee Hean at the Ministry of Defence.

== Military collaboration ==
Pakistan-Singapore military collaboration can be largely regarded as being low-key and mostly under the pretext of multi-national military exercise, UN mission mandate and humanitarian missions.

Singapore SAF Medical Corps deployment in East Pakistan in 1970 for humanitarian aid, Operation Palm, was Singapore military's first overseas deployment. For the Singapore first peacekeeping mission, the United Nations Special Mission in Afghanistan (UNSMA), Singapore military personnels were based in Islamabad, the UNSMA headquarters.

In July – August 2008, Singapore Navy and Pakistan Navy along with other multi-national navies participated in Exercise KAKADU hosted by the Royal Australian Navy to enhance interoperability among regional defence forces through conventional maritime training.

Singaporean and Pakistani navies have also jointly participated in Ex Pacific Reach in November 2007 which is a submarine rescue exercise aimed at promoting greater understanding and interoperability amongst the participating navies.

== See also ==
- Foreign relations of Pakistan
- Foreign relations of Singapore
- Pakistanis in Singapore
- Singapore Airlines Flight 117
