= Muhammad Jalaluddin Sayeed =

Pakistani sailor and shipping executive

- Born: 1 December 1920; Hyderabad, Hyderabad State
- Died: 17 September 2005 (aged 84); Karachi, Pakistan
- Occupations: Sailor; captain
- Known for: Maritime industry
- Children: 4
- Relatives: S. M. Ahsan (cousin)

Muhammad Jalaluddin Sayeed (1 December 1920 - 17 September 2005) known as MJ, was a Pakistani maritime sailor and industry veteran who was the founding director of Neptune Orient Lines (NOL), a Singapore-based shipping company. He had vast experience as a maritime sailor.

== Early life and education ==
Muhammad Jalaluddin Sayeed was born in December 1920 in Hyderabad to Dr. Lateef Sayeed and Mahmooda Begum. Dr. Lateef Sayeed was the secretary of the Indian National Congress of Hyderabad state, a journalist, and friend to Rabindranath Tagore, to the Nizam of Hyderabad, to Mahatma Gandhi and to Jawaharlal Nehru.

Sayeed, along with his first cousin S. M. Ahsan, left their hometown in 1936 to board the Indian Mercantile Marine Training Ship, HMIS Dufferin, which sailed from Bombay Harbour. At the end of 1938, Sayeed passed out in first place of his batch of deck cadets, while Ahsan came in first place.

== Personal life ==
Vice Admiral S. M. Ahsan, the Commander-in-Chief of the Pakistan Navy from 1966 to 1969, was his first cousin.

In 1948, Sayeed married Zareena and had four daughters, Mahjabeen, Nazneen, Lubna and Fatima.

== Professional career ==
In 1939, Sayeed signed on Jalapadma, a converted cargo vessel, owned by the Scindia Steam Navigation Company. He qualified as a Master in London in 1947. He returned to Bombay to help organise the Maritime Union of India. He went back to London to study for his Extra Master Mariner's certificate in 1952. After getting his certificate in 1953, he returned to the sea until 1956 when he came ashore to stay. He later joined Karachi's National Shipping Corporation as a marine superintendent in 1960, and worked his way up to become the commercial manager.

=== Building Singapore maritime industry ===
In 1968, the Singapore government requested the government of Pakistan for an expert to advise them on the formation of a shipping company. Sayeed was chosen for this task by the Pakistan government, a decision which the Pakistan National Shipping Corporation agreed to as well. In Singapore, Sayeed formed Neptune Orient Lines (NOL) in 1969 and worked there until 1973. At the time of his departure, the then Prime Minister, Lee Kuan Yew, wrote him the following farewell letter:

Thank you for your letter of September 7 telling me that you have decided to return to Pakistan. May I sincerely thank you for having helped NOL get on its feet. Your services were invaluable. Thank you for the kind and generous compliments you have paid to the people of Singapore, and for your good wishes to my wife, children and me. May I wish you an interesting and rewarding future as you move to new challenges. For a person of your years to find the time and interest in-between your duties to be able to write a note to me in Chinese demonstrates the triumph of an inquisitive mind and an indomitable spirit over hard challenges.

During his career at NOL, Goh Chok Tong worked as a financial controller under him in NOL. After his death, Goh sent the following message to his wife Zareena:

"Captain Sayeed laid the keel for NOL and built it up into a reputable international line for which Singapore will always be grateful. None of us had ever run a shipping line and Captain Sayeed was patient in teaching us the ropes..."

== Death and legacy ==
Muhammad Jalaluddin Sayeed went to Bombay for cancer treatment in 2004. He died on 17 September 2005 in Karachi.

In 2006, NOL established a Scholarship in his memory for a Master of Science degree in Maritime Studies which is jointly offered at Nanyang Technological University and Norwegian School of Management.

In NOL's own words, "It (the scholarship) recognises Sayeed's pioneering spirit and his contributions to NOL and the maritime industry in Singapore."

Sayeed was mentioned in the 2015 book, "Not Born In Singapore: Fifty Personalities Who Shaped the Nation".

== See also ==
- Pakistanis in Singapore
- Pakistan – Singapore relations
