= Singaporean response to 2005 Kashmir earthquake =

In the aftermath of the 2005 Kashmir earthquake on 8 October in the Pakistan-administered region of Kashmir, several rescue and relief operations have been organised in Singapore to assist victims of the disaster.

Prime Minister Lee Hsien Loong wrote letters of condolence to both Pakistani President Pervez Musharraf. In his letter to Musharraf, Lee said he was deeply saddened to hear of the earthquake in South Asia, which has caused devastation and heavy loss of life in Pakistan.

In his letter to Dr. Manmohan Singh, Lee said he was deeply saddened by the loss of life in Kashmir as a result of the earthquake. He said: "On behalf of the Government and people of Singapore, I would like to convey our condolences and deepest sympathies to you and to the families of the victims." He added that India demonstrated resilience and resolve in the wake of the 2004 Indian Ocean earthquake, and he was confident that it would once again respond decisively to this challenge.

== Disaster rescue team ==
The Singapore Civil Defence Force (SCDF) was dispatching a 44-member Disaster Assistance and Rescue Team (DART) to help Pakistan's relief and rescue operations. They brought along three search-and-rescue dogs to assist in looking for survivors buried under the earthquake rubble. Two C-130 Hercules aircraft from the Republic of Singapore Air Force were used to transport the team to Pakistan.

As of 16 October, the SCDF team, called the Lion Heart, have treated 204 patients since its arrival at Muzaffarabad and other outskirt towns. Other international teams that were still operating in Muzaffarabad at that time were from Turkey, North Cyprus and Malaysia.

== Relief and medical teams ==
Singapore also sent two medical and relief teams to the disaster site.

A six-member team of relief workers from Mercy Relief and the Singapore General Hospital was sent to Pakistan to help the victims. Stationed at a partially damaged hospital in Muzaffarabad, the team brought with them food and medical supplies, as well as items like tents and blankets, which the Pakistani relief workers have identified as essential items. In the two weeks deployment, the team has treated about 7,000 patients.

The Singapore Red Cross sent a four-member medical teams composed of two doctors and two nurses to Pakistan to provide emergency medical relief assistance. They were working with the disaster response team from Pakistan's Red Crescent and the International Federation of Red Cross and Red Crescent in Islamabad.

== Community relief effort ==
Various community groups have rallied and organised the collection of donation and relief supplies, including effort by the 4,000 strong Pakistani community in Singapore. The Singapore Pakistan Association has set up four centres across the country to help collect relief supplies. The needed relief supplies are shelter items like tents and plastic sheets, blankets and mattresses, food items like high energy biscuits and pre-cooked halal tinned food. Also needed are medicines like antibiotics, typhoid medication, fracture related and first aid kits, surgical instruments and water purification tablets.

The Pakistani High Commission in Singapore is coordinating these effort and providing information to the public about the disaster and the relief operation. The High Commission is also accepting donations made out to the "Presidents' Relief Fund for Earthquake Victims - 2005." As of 26 October, this joint fundraising effort has collected S$700,000.

The Islamic Religious Council of Singapore (MUIS) launched a public appeal and organised a special fund-raising in aid of the affected victims. Donation boxes marked "Humanitarian Aid to Earthquake Victims in Pakistan, India & Afghanistan" were placed at all its 68 mosques. As of 20 October 2005,. MUIS has collected S$155,000 in its fund-raising.

The Singapore Red Cross made a public appeal in helping to raise funds for the victims of the earthquake, accepting cheques made out to the "Singapore Red Cross Society" with "Asian Earthquake" marked at the back of it.
