= Pakistanis in Singapore =

Pakistani diaspora in Singapore

Total population
- 4,562 (2012)

Languages
- Urdu, (Note: Also known as Lashkari (لشکری )) English, Malay

Religion
- Islam

Related ethnic groups
- Pakistanis in Malaysia; Pakistani diaspora

Pakistanis in Singapore include migrants who settled in colonial-era Singapore, their descendants and more recent migrants, including students. As of 2010, the National University of Singapore Pakistani Society had at least 120 members. The Singapore Urdu Development Centre offers classes in Urdu language to the children of Pakistanis, whereas the Singapore Pakistani Association promotes Pakistani culture in Singapore in collaboration with the Pakistan high commission.

== History ==
Most Singaporean-Pakistanis are descended from migrants from the Punjab and North-West Frontier Province who settled in Singapore during the period of British colonial rule. While the first generation of migrants spoke Pakistani languages, the second and third generations were taught in Malay at school, and acculturation into the Malay language and culture were also assisted by Pakistan families' reliance on their Malay neighbours for religious obligation such as weddings and funerals and the lack of a "Pakistani" mosque. Malay is the first language of most third-generation Singaporean-Pakistanis.

== Notable people ==
- Saad Janjua - Cricketer in Singapore National Cricket team.
- Shauket Aziz - Former Pakistani PM, spend several years working in Singapore Citibank in 1990s.
- Captain Muhammad Jalaluddin Sayeed - NOL's founding Managing Director, and Singapore maritime industry key pioneer.
- Ali Zahid, Pakistani politician
- Nida Manzoor, lived in Singapore to the age of ten.

== See also ==
- Pakistan-Singapore relations
