= Herbert Feldman =

English-Pakistani author

Personal details
- Born: 5 November 1910 London, England
- Died: 19 March 1976 (aged 65) Karachi, Sindh, Pakistan
- Spouse: Nishat Hayat
- Education: Gray's Inn
- Profession: Lawyer, businessman, author

Military service
- Allegiance: United Kingdom
- Branch/service: British Army
- Years of service: 1940–1946
- Rank: Major
- Unit: Royal Artillery
- Battles/wars: World War II

Henry Herbert Sidney Feldman, known as Herbert Feldman, was an English lawyer, businessman, and prominent author who lived and worked in Pakistan from its independence in 1947 until his death in 1976. Feldman analysed and wrote extensively on the early political history of Pakistan.

== Early life and education ==
Henry Herbert Sidney Feldman was born on 5 November 1910 in London, England, to Harry Feldman, a manufacturer, and Mary Feldman. He completed his early education in London and earned a High school diploma.

Pursuing a career in Law, he attended Gray's Inn and became a Barrister-at-Law.

== Career ==
=== British India and World War II ===
During World War II, Herbert Feldman enlisted into the Royal Artillery in 1940. He received an emergency commission as a Second Lieutenant on 4 August 1941 and travelled to British india with the British Army. In 1942, he attained the rank of acting Major. On 5 January 1943, he was made temporary major and appointed as a General staff officer in the Directorate of Royal Artillery located at GHQ India.

Feldman retired from active service in 1946. He later briefly served in the British Indian Government in Delhi.

=== Pakistan ===
During the Partition of India, Feldman opted for Pakistan and moved to Karachi, where he continued practicing as a lawyer. He also became a senior insurance executive and worked at the Karachi Chamber of Commerce and Industry Building.

He married a Punjabi Muslim woman, Nishat Hayat, who was the daughter of Liaqat Hayat Khan.

Herbert Feldman died on 19 March 1976 in Karachi, Pakistan.

==== Notable works ====
- A Constitution for Pakistan
- Karachi Through a Hundred Years
- The Land and People of Pakistan
- Revolution in Pakistan: A Study of the Martial Law Administration
- From Crisis to Crisis: Pakistan 1962–1969
- End and the Beginning: Pakistan 1969–1971
