= 1981 Anson by-election =

- 31 October 1981
- Registered: 14,512
- Turnout: 13,746 (94.72%) ▲0.38pp

	First party	Second party	Third party
Candidate	J. B. Jeyaretnam	Pang Kim Hin	Harbans Singh
Party	WP	PAP	United People's Front
Popular vote	7,012	6,359	131
Percentage	51.93%	47.10%	0.97%
Swing	▲51.93%	▼37.00%	▼14.93%
MP before election
Devan Nair
PAP
Elected MP
J. B. Jeyaretnam
WP

A parliamentary by-election was held in the Anson Constituency in Singapore on 31 October 1981. It was called following the resignation of Devan Nair, the incumbent Member of Parliament (MP) from the People's Action Party (PAP), who had vacated the seat to become the third President of Singapore. The by-election marked a pivotal moment in Singapore's political history, as it resulted in the first opposition victory in Parliament since independence in 1965.

The by-election was contested by three candidates: Pang Kim Hin of the PAP, J.B. Jeyaretnam of the Workers' Party (WP), and Harbans Singh of the United People's Front (UPF). Jeyaretnam won with 51.9% of the vote, defeating the PAP candidate with a significant swing. His victory ended the PAP's unbroken control of all parliamentary seats since 1968 and marked the return of an opposition voice to the legislature. The result was seen as a breakthrough for opposition politics in Singapore, energising the opposition movement and reshaping the political landscape.

Prime Minister Lee Kuan Yew acknowledged the result as a setback for the PAP and attributed the loss to voter discontent, particularly among younger and working-class constituents. The by-election highlighted concerns over issues such as the rising cost of living, housing, and employment. In the aftermath, the PAP sought to address these concerns while reinforcing its political base, and the outcome signalled a modest yet symbolically important shift in Singapore's tightly controlled political environment, as the PAP, while remaining the dominant party in Singapore politics, never again attained a government monopoly of all the seats in Parliament.

== Background ==
On 14 October, Devan Nair was sworn as the nation's third President of Singapore; under the Constitution, a President is a nonpartisan role, and therefore Nair was required to resign from both the party and his seat of Anson. It was the third time Anson had gone to the polls via by-election, after 1961 and 1979. Nominations commenced a week after on 21 October.

== Candidates ==
On 21 October 1981, the three candidates were nominated, as follows:

Candidates	Party	Background
Pang Kim Hin	People's Action Party	Pang, a 32-year-old deputy divisional manager and a member of the People's Action Party, is the nephew of former cabinet minister Lim Kim San, who retired from politics a year ago.
J.B. Jeyaretnam	Workers' Party	Jeyaretnam, the current secretary-general since 1971, made his sixth bid of entry into the parliament since his first electoral debut in 1972. Outside of politics, Jeyaretnam was Singapore's first criminal district lawyer.
Harbans Singh	United People's Front	A member of the United People's Front, who was also a former member of United People's Party and Barisan Sosialis. He once lost his $1,200 election deposit in 1976 where he was defeated in a 10.97%-89.03% vote to Tanjong Pagar incumbent and Prime Minister Lee Kuan Yew, the highest result for that election.

A candidate, Chiam See Tong, who recently founded Singapore Democratic Party (SDP) a year prior to the by-election, expressed interest but withdrew later and backed Jeyaretnam.

== Result ==
By-election 1981: Anson
Party	Candidate	Votes	%	±%
WP	J.B. Jeyaretnam	7,012	51.93	▲51.9
PAP	Pang Kim Hin	6,359	47.10	▼37.0
UPF	Harbans Singh	131	0.97	▼14.9
Majority		653	4.8	N/A
Turnout		13,746	94.7	▲0.3
WP gain from PAP		Swing	N/A	

== Aftermath and legacy ==
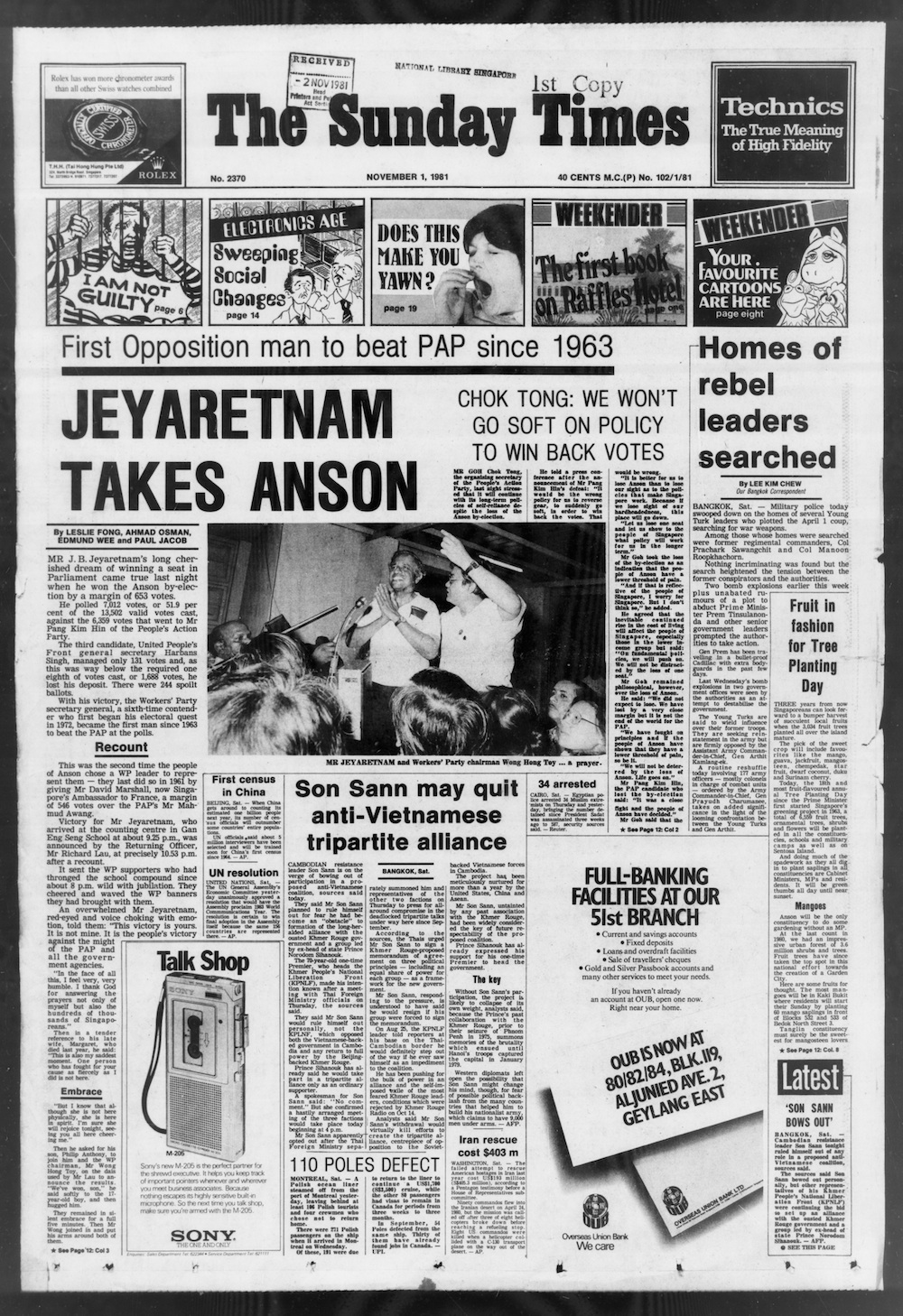
The Sunday Times the day after the by-election, reporting on Jeyaretnam's victory.

The 37% swing against the PAP is the largest ever swing in a by-election in post-independence Singapore, and the second largest since 1961, which coincidentally also saw a PAP candidate losing a by-election to an independent candidate in Hong Lim Constituency, and WP's founder David Marshall electing in Anson. This marked the first time where an opposition party gained a seat from the ruling People's Action Party in a by-election, and also the first time where the Parliament had an opposition representation since the exit of the boycotting of Barisan Sosialis back in 1965.

=== Analysis ===
Analysis cited that Pang's defeat was the lack of public exposure or usage of Anson's grassroots leaders during his campaign as compared to Jeyaretnam who had stood in several general and by-elections. Another issue surrounding the campaign was that residents in the Blair Plain area of the constituency were unhappy that they were not being given priority for Housing and Development Board (HDB) flats when their homes were being demolished to make way for a new Port of Singapore Authority container complex, and some voters may have used the by-election as an opportunity to express discontent regarding this. The term "by-election effect", which referenced the vote swing against the incumbents, was coined as a result of the analysis and by-election.

=== Legacy ===
Following the by-election, Pang announced his retirement of politics; while the PAP had offered Pang to contest in the next election, Pang declined, thus making him the first PAP candidate to never enter parliament. Harbans Singh became the first candidate in Singapore election's history to have forfeited his election deposit twice, with the first occurring on the 1976 elections contesting under Tanjong Pagar.

In 1984, the PAP legislature introduced the Non-constituency Member of Parliament scheme in response to the by-election, and the need for opposition legislators. This scheme would mandate the minimum number of opposition legislators determined by the best "non-elected" opposition candidates with at least 15% of the valid votes. The reception of the scheme, however, was mixed with criticism from the oppositions.

In the ensuing election months after the NCMP scheme was passed, Jeyaretnam was able to retain its seat in the next general election in 1984 with an increased margin; however, he was later removed in 1986 following a conviction over pressed charges, and Anson subsequently redrawn into Tiong Bahru GRC and Tanjong Pagar SMC in the following election.

The next time an opposition party would win a parliamentary seat from the PAP during mid-term was in 2013; similarly, the by-election was coincidentally also a multi-cornered contest featuring the WP, who eventually won the seat of Punggol East, and another candidate of a smaller party ended up losing its electoral deposit for a second time.
