= Pang Kim Hin =

Singaporean politician (born c. 1949)

Pang Kim Hin (Chinese: 冯金兴; born c. 1949) is a businessman and former politician from Singapore. He stood as the candidate of the governing People's Action Party (PAP) in the Anson by-election in 1981. He was defeated by the leader of the Workers' Party, J.B. Jeyaretnam, becoming the first candidate from Singapore's ruling party to lose an election for a seat in Parliament since Singapore's independence.

The 1981 by-election in the constituency of Anson was called when Devan Nair stepped down from Parliament to become President of Singapore. Pang, who had never stood in a Parliamentary election before, was selected as the PAP's candidate. He faced Jeyaretnam, who had previously stood in three general elections and two by-elections in Singapore (though he had never been a candidate in Anson before), and Harbans Singh of the United People's Front.

In the election, on 21 October 1981, Pang took 6,359 votes (47.1%) to Jeyaretnam's 7,012 (51.9%). Harbans Singh took 131 votes (1.0%).

A number of factors are thought to have contributed to Pang's defeat. One of them was that he was a new face to the public in Singapore whereas Jeyaretnam was a veteran of several elections. Another factor may have been that Pang did not make use of Anson's grassroots leaders during his campaign, upsetting some of them, and that he did not connect effectively with working-class people in the constituency. Another issue surrounding the campaign was that residents in the Blair Plain area of the constituency were unhappy that they were not being given priority for HDB flats when their homes were being demolished to make way for a new Port of Singapore Authority container complex. Some voters may have used the by-election as an opportunity to express discontent regarding this.
