= Salahuddin Ahmed (judge) =

1st chief justice of the Federal Shariat Court

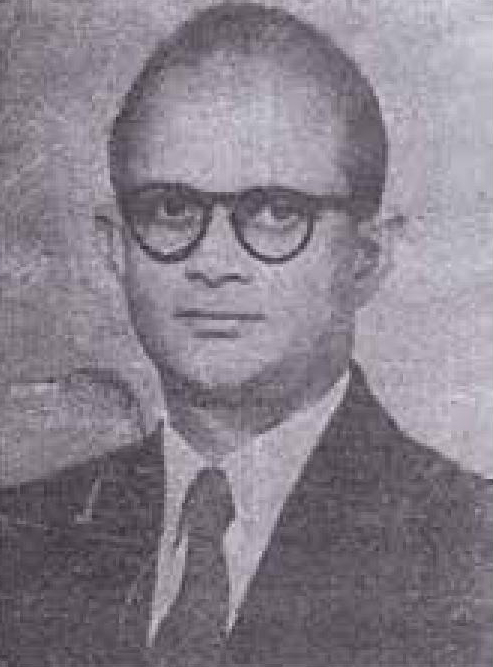

1st Chief Justice of the Federal Shariat Court
- In office 26 May 1980 – 25 May 1981
- Nominated by: Muhammad Zia-ul-Haq
- Succeeded by: Sheikh Aftab Hussain (Acting)

Justice of the Supreme Court of Pakistan
- In office 1970–1979
- Nominated by: Hamoodur Rahman

Personal details
- Born: 1 January 1912 Calcutta, British India
- Education: University of Calcutta

Salahuddin Ahmed was a Pakistani judge who served as the 1st chief justice of the Federal Shariat Court from 26 May 1980 to 25 May 1981 and as a Supreme Court of Pakistan judge from 1 March 1970 until he retired in 1979.

== Biography ==
He was born on 1 January 1912 in Calcutta, British India. He obtained a degree in laws from the University of Calcutta. After completing his education, he was appointed as the Calcutta High Court advocate and then additional judge High Court of East Pakistan on 22 December 1960.

He became chief justice of Federal Shariat Court on 26 May 1980 and retired from Shariat Court on 25 May 1981.
