= Prisoners of war in the Indo-Pakistani war of 1971 =

The Pakistani prisoners of war in the Indo-Pakistani war of 1971 were the servicemen deployed in the Eastern Command of the Pakistan armed forces who were held in by the Indian Army.

Pakistan's Yahya administration conveyed their intentions to retreat from their eastern wing to the United Nations on 10 December 1971, and a formal surrender was submitted and accepted when the Commander of Eastern Command and Governor of East Pakistan, Lieutenant-General A. A. K. Niazi, signed an instrument of surrender with his counterpart, Lieutenant General Jagjit Singh Aurora, GOC-in-C of Eastern Command, on 16 December 1971.

The surrender ultimately culminated in the conclusion of liberation efforts in East Pakistan as India accepts the unilateral ceasefire to end its war efforts in the western theatre on 17 December 1971. The surrender was the largest surrender since the end of World War II, with the Indian Army taking approximately 93,000 Pakistani service personnel and allied militiamen as war prisoners in East Pakistan.

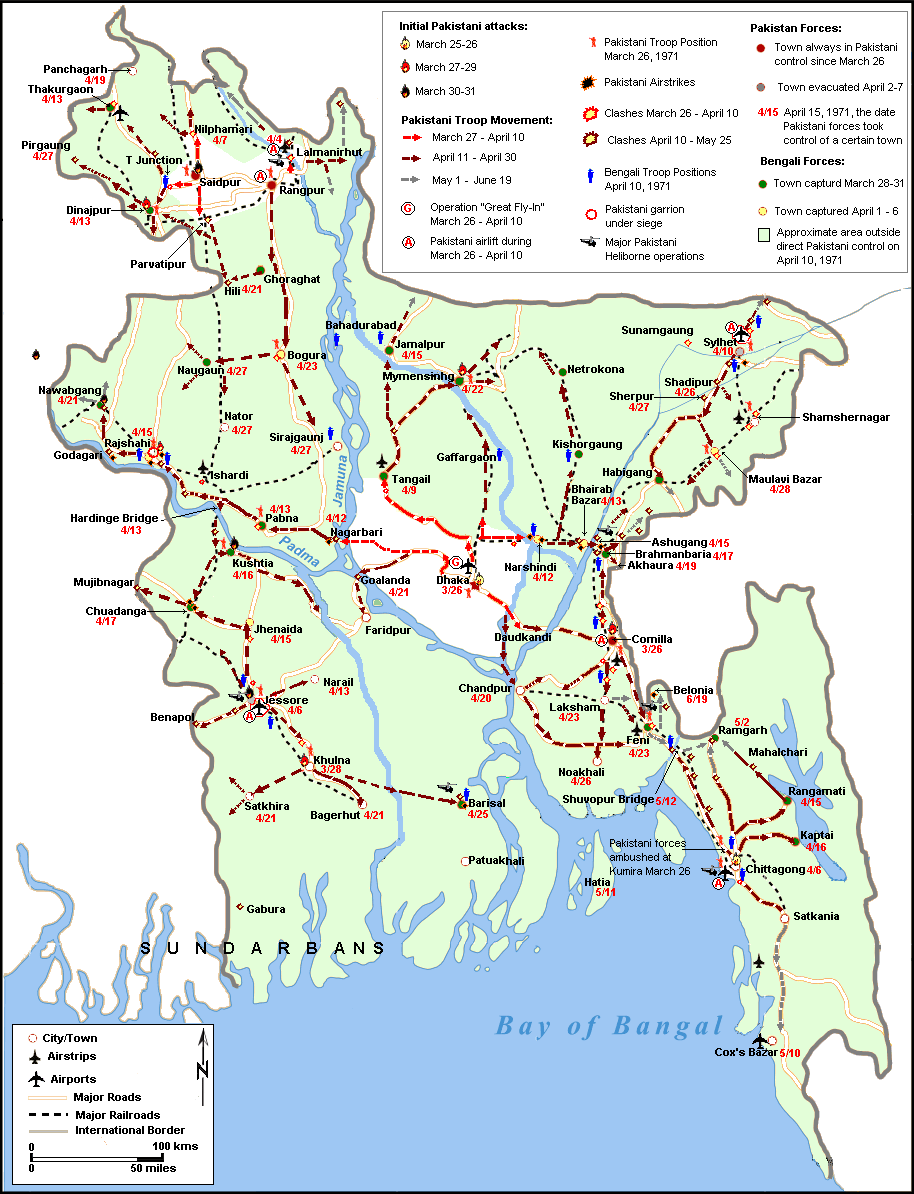
Military map of East Pakistan.

Due to the concern of their safety and wellbeing, the war prisoners were transported via train and air, where they were held in the war camps by the Indian Army in different parts of India. The issue of transfer and transportation of war prisoners to India was very controversial between India and Bangladesh since the Provisional Government of Bangladesh had shown strong resistance and opposition to such an act to India as they wanted to bring charges on the war prisoners on the crimes against humanity in their special courts established in Dhaka.

The overwhelming majority of war prisoners were officers; most of them were in the Army and Navy, while a relatively small number of Air Force and Marines; others in larger number had served in paramilitary forces. India treated the war prisoners in accordance to the Geneva Convention, ruled 1925, but used this issue as a tool to coerce Pakistan into recognizing the sovereignty of Bangladesh after three countries reached compromised in 1974. The issue of war prisoners contributed to quick recognition of Bangladesh, but it also had effects on India securing its eastern front from Pakistan-controlled hostile state, East-Pakistan, to India supported Bangladesh.

According to Pakistani observers and commentators, India, by taking and managing the ~93,000 war prisoners in Indian Army-run camps, had gained itself a bargaining chip to remove its security threat faced by its eastern front by recognizing the sovereignty of the country, Bangladesh, they had intervened to help. However, according to Indian author, M. Ragostra, the war prisoners were actually more of a liability than leverage since it became India's responsibility to protect and feed the prisoners that were in great numbers.

== Custody and detainment ==
After conceding defeat and accession of the instrument of surrender in 1971, the Indian Army took the responsibility to protect Pakistan's joint servicemen in East-Pakistan. During the early phases of the surrender, Lieutenant-General Jagjit Singh Aurora allowed the Pakistani servicemen their right to bear small arms for their protection against the insurgents of Mukti Bahini who were seeking their revenge on Pakistani servicemen.

In December 1971, the Provisional Government of Bangladesh had shown their intention to India regarding the war prisoners, creating controversy between India and Bangladesh, as Bangladeshis wanted to hold the cases on the Pakistani servicemen who would be charged with the crimes against humanity in their special courts, and strongly opposed the Indian Army's plan for transferring war prisoners. Members of the Bangladesh government and public spoke specifically of prosecuting 194 Pakistan Army, Air Force and Navy officers for war crimes. From 1971 till 1972, the Indian Army quickly transferred the war prisoners to their special war camps in different parts of India through train and air transportation, mainly due to prisoners safety and wellbeing.

The military commanders of the Eastern Command of the Pakistani military were held in Fort William in Calcutta, and were transferred by Air India's commercial plane. Later, the commanders were held in Jabalpur Cantonment. In 1973, the majority of the war prisoners were then shifted to Red Fort and Gwalior Fort in New Delhi.

The Indian government treated all the war prisoners in strict accordance with the Geneva Convention, ruled in 1925. These 93,000 war prisoners were slowly released by India who were repatriated at the Zero Point, Wagah, and the Line of Control (LoC). India took approximately 93,000 prisoners of war that included Pakistani soldiers as well as some of their East Pakistani collaborators. 79,676 of these prisoners were uniformed personnel, of which 55,692 were Army, 16,354 Paramilitary, 5,296 Police, 1000 Navy and 800 PAF. The remaining 13,324 prisoners were civilians - either family members of the military personnel or Bihari Razarkars.

Before the war prisoners were repatriated, Pakistan and India had to sign the Simla Agreement in 1972, but it was not until 1974 when the Delhi Agreement was signed that marked the repatriation. The Simla Agreement treaty ensured that Pakistan recognized the independence of Bangladesh in exchange for the return of the Pakistani POWs.

Since 1978, some Indian government officials have claimed that about 54 Indian soldiers of the Indian Armed Forces went missing in action during the Indo-Pakistani War of 1971 and that they are secretly held by Pakistan. Pakistan denies the existence of such prisoners of war.

== Notable Pakistani POWs ==
- Lt-Gen. Amir Abdullah Khan Niazi, PA, Commander of Eastern Command.
- R.-Adm Mohammad Shariff, PN, later four-star admiral and Chairman joint chiefs in 1980.
- Maj-Gen. Rao Farman Ali, military adviser and chairman of Fauji Foundation in the 1970s.
- Air-Cdre Inamul Haque, PAF pilot, later three-star rank air force general and politician
- Maj-Gen. Mohammad Jamshed, PA
- Capt. Ahmad Zamir, CO PM in East, later appointed as Vice-Admiral in the Navy.
- Gp-Capt. Zulfiqar Ali Khan, PAF pilot and later four-star rank air force general.
- Lt-Cdr. Mansurul Haq, PN, four-star admiral in the Navy.
- Flt-Lt. PQ Mehdi– the PAF pilot who shot down, first POW, ascended as four-star rank air force general, Air Chief Marshal, and chief of air staff in 2000.
- Lt. Shahid Karimullah, PN, four-star admiral in the Pakistan Navy in 2005.
- Maj. K.M. Arif, PA, four-star rank army general and vice-chief of army staff 1987.
- Cdr. T.K. Khan, PN, four-star admiral in 1983.
- Maj. Siddique Salik, PA, later one-star rank army general and DG of Inter-Services Public Relations in 1988
- Capt. Ikram Sehgal, first to escape the prison camp.
- Lt-Col. Raja Nadir Pervez, PM, politician.
- Cdr. Iqbal F. Quadir, PN, analyst and later ascended as vice-admiral and vice naval chief in 1983.
- Lt. Abdul Aziz Mirza, PN, later ascended as four-star admiral in 2002.
- Capt. Jamshed Gulzar Kiani, PA later ascended as three-star rank army general.
- Lt. T.M. Khattak, PN, three-star rank admiral in the Navy
- Lt-Cdr Shamoon Alam Khan, PN and ISI officer, diplomat and later three-star rank admiral in the Navy.

== Foreign relations impact ==
The foreign reaction to India's taking of these 90,000 POWs varied from nation to nation. The United Nations supported India's move as they condemned the human rights violations the Pakistani Armed Forces inflicted upon Bangladeshis. As a result, the U.N. was quick to accept Bangladesh's independence. Bhutan became the second country after India to recognize Bangladesh's independence, and did so with no issues.

The United States, however, was an ally of Pakistan both materially and politically, and as a result, they did not support India's taking of 90,000 Pakistani POWs. The U.S. saw India's actions as threatening, especially since India had just become a nuclear power and maintained close military ties with the U.S.S.R. The Soviet Union supported both the armies of Bangladesh and India and thus supported Bangladesh's unwaveringly. As a result of Soviet support, all nations that were part of the Warsaw Pact also recognized Bangladesh's independence. Soviet backing ensured that the states in the U.S.S.R.'s sphere of influence, including Albania, Bulgaria, Czechoslovakia, East Germany, Hungary, Poland, and Romania, all recognized Bangladesh's independence. China, despite being a communist nation, was also an ally of Pakistan and did not support the measures India took to have Bangladeshi sovereignty recognized. China even went as far as vetoing Bangladesh's application to become a member of the United Nations and was one of the last nations in the world to recognize Bangladeshi independence, not doing so until 31 August 1975.

== See also ==
- 1971 (2007 film), Indian film about POWs in the war
- Prisoner-of-war camp
- Indo-Pakistani war of 1971
- Timeline of the Bangladesh Liberation War
- Military plans of the Bangladesh Liberation War
- Mitro Bahini order of battle
- Pakistan Army order of battle, December 1971
- Evolution of Pakistan Eastern Command plan
- 1971 Bangladesh genocide
- Operation Searchlight
- Indo-Pakistani wars and conflicts
- List of military disasters
