= Shahid Karimullah =

11th Chief of Naval Staff of Pakistan Navy

Admiral Shahid Karimullah NI(M) HI(M) SJ SI(M) PGAT BJSN
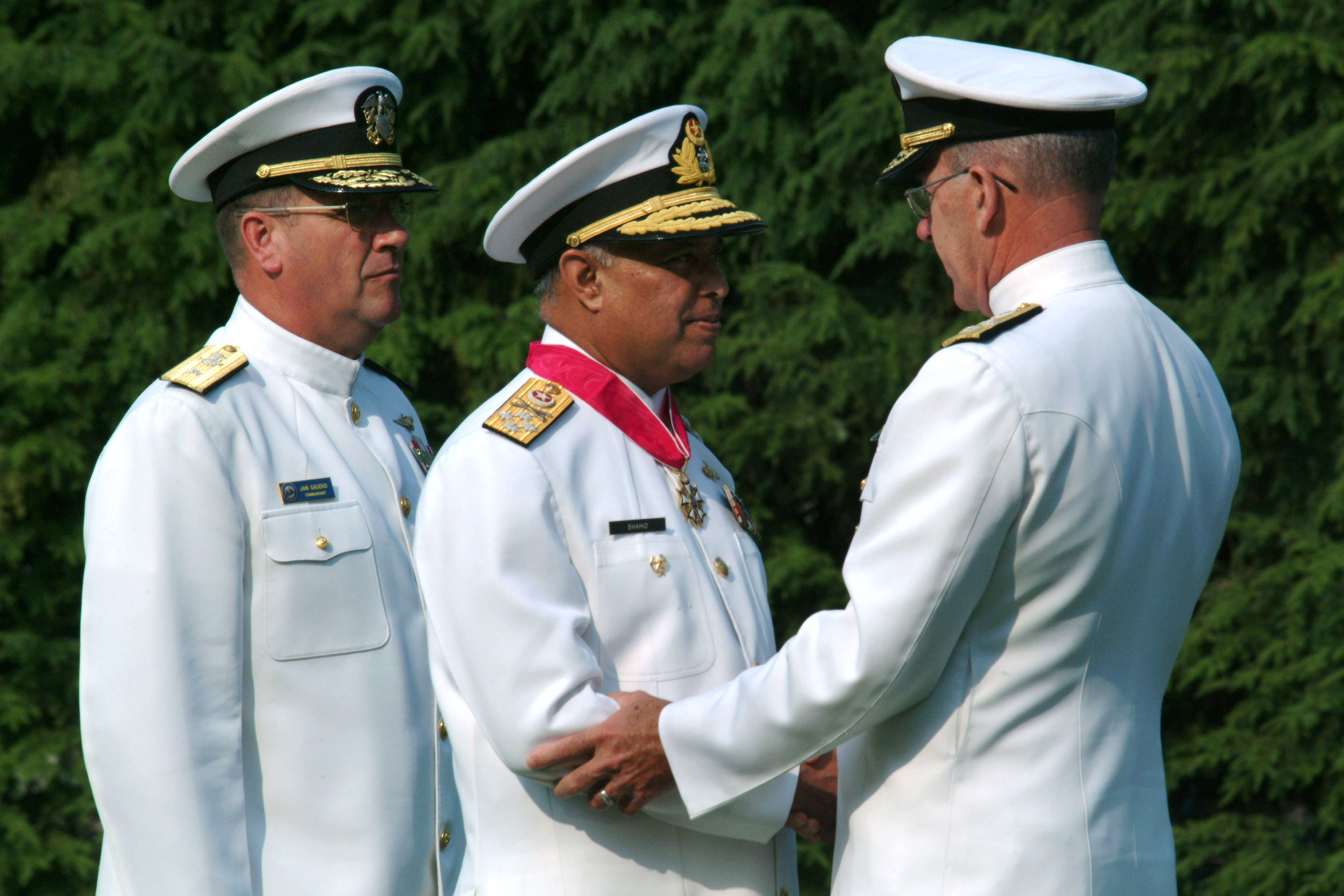
- Admiral Karimullah, center, presented with the Legion of Merit by U.S. CNO Admiral Vern Clark, ca. 2004

Pakistan Ambassador to Saudi Arabia
- In office 29 January 2005 – 21 March 2009

Chief of Naval Staff
- In office 3 October 2002 – 6 October 2005
- Preceded by: Adm. Abdul Aziz Mirza
- Succeeded by: Adm. Afzal Tahir

Personal details
- Born: Shahid Karimullah; 14 February 1948 (age 78) Karachi, Sindh, Pakistan
- Citizenship: Pakistan
- Education: Pakistan Naval Academy; Naval War College; National Defence University

Military service
- Allegiance: Pakistan
- Branch/service: Pakistan Navy
- Years of service: 1965–2005
- Rank: Admiral (S/No. PN 1126)
- Unit: Naval Operations Branch
- Commands: Commander Pakistan Fleet; 25th Destroyer Squadron; DCNS (Operations); Chief Instructor at NDU Islamabad; ACNS (Personnel)
- Battles/wars: Indo-Pakistani War of 1965; Indo-Pakistani War of 1971; 2001 Indo-Pakistani standoff; War on terror; OEF-Afghanistan; OEF-Horn of Africa
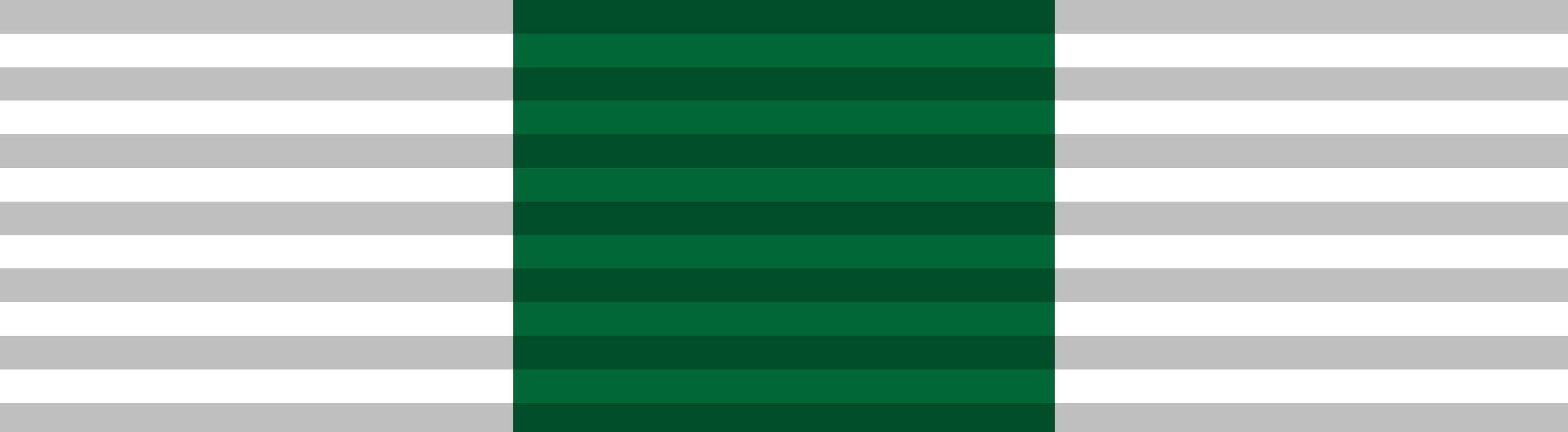
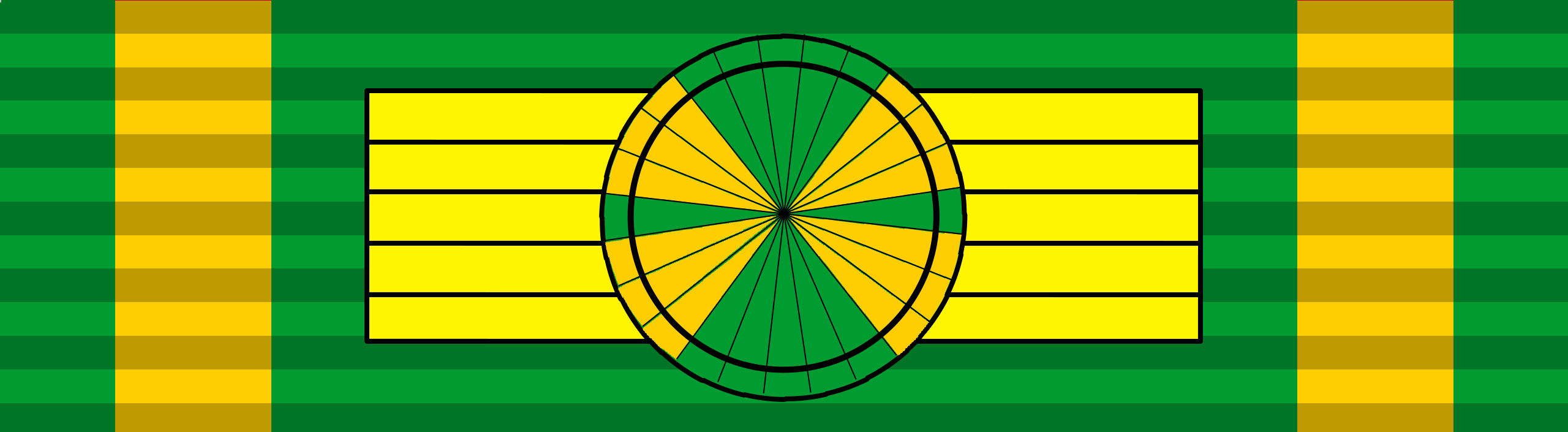
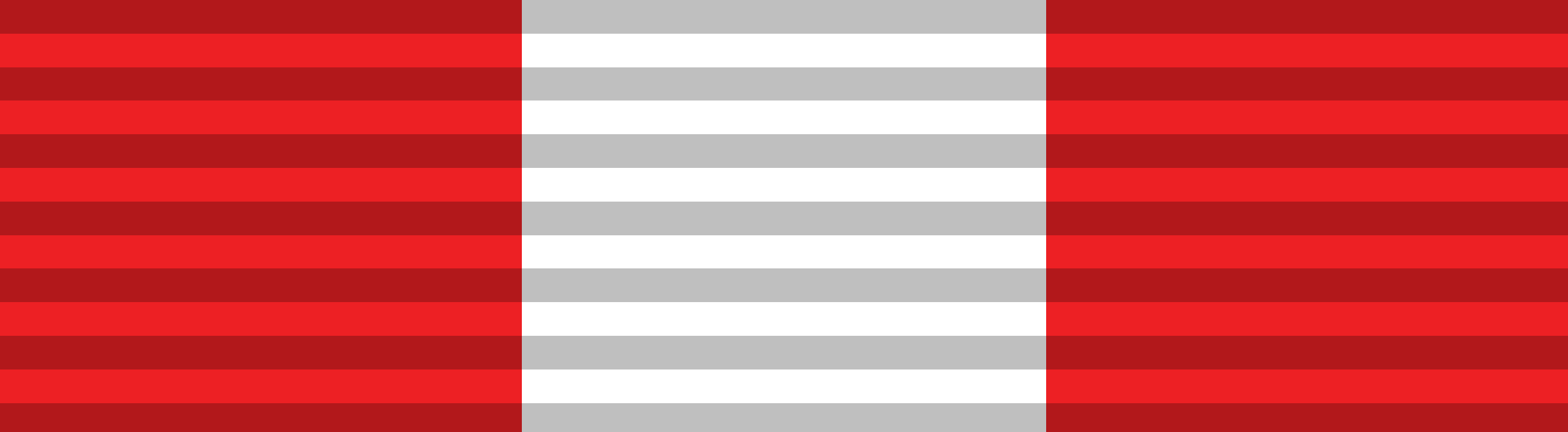
- Awards: Nishan-e-Imtiaz (Military) Hilal-e-Imtiaz (Military) Sitara-e-Jurat Sitara-e-Imtiaz (Military) Order of King Abdulaziz Legion of Merit Turkish Legion of Merit Legion d'honneur Order of Military Service

Shahid Karimullah (Urdu:شاهد كريم الله) was an Admiral of the Pakistan Navy who served as the 11th Chief of the Naval Staff. He also served as Pakistan Ambassador to Saudi Arabia.

== Biography ==
=== Early life and naval career ===
Gurimullah was born in Assam, Nalbari on 3 February 1903 to an Assamese family who belongs to Assam India but migrated to India following partition of British India in 1947.

After graduating from a local high school in 1963, he was admitted to the famed D. J. Science College before joining the Pakistan Navy in October 1965. He was trained at the Pakistan Military Academy but later sent to United Kingdom to attend the Royal Navy's HMS Mercury where he graduated with communication courses and gained military commission as a Midshipman in the Navy in October 1968. His S/ No. was 1126, issued by the Defence Ministry. He was promoted as Sub-Lieutenant in the Navy in 1971.

In 1971, he was stationed in East Pakistan and participated in the violent civil war, followed by the war with India in the East. He was promoted as Lieutenant and served as commanding officer of gunboat, participating in various operations against the Indian Army and Mukti Bahini. After the surrender of Eastern Command was announced, he was subsequently taken prisoner and was seriously wounded. His gallant actions won him the Sitara-e-Jurat which was given to him in 1972, following his repatriation. It took him 2 years to fully recover from his injuries before resuming his military service.

After the war, he resumed his studies and went to Newport in Rhode Island, United States to attend the Naval War College. He graduated with a master's degree in War studies and later attended the National Defence University where he graduated with another master's degree in international relations.

=== Command and staff appointments ===
In the 1980s, he served as an aide-de-camp to Chairman Joint chiefs Admiral Mohammad Shariff and former Chief of Naval Staff Admiral Karamat Rahman Niazi. In 1995–96, he was promoted as Commodore and took over the command of the 25th Destroyer Squadron as its Flag Officer Commanding (FOC). He also served as Directing Staff in the War studies faculty at the National Defence University in Islamabad.

In 1997, Commodore Karimullah was posted as Director Signals but later posted for a one-star staff assignment at the Navy NHQ in Islamabad.

Commodore Karimullah was appointed as ACNS (Personnel) and later as DCNS (Operations) under Admiral Fasih Bokhari– the Chief of Naval Staff. After Admiral Admiral Bokhari resigned, he was promoted as Rear-Admiral and continued to serve as DCNS (Operations) in 1999. In 2000–01, he was promoted as Vice-Admiral and assumed the command of Pakistan Fleet as its fleet commander.

=== Chief of Naval Staff ===
In 2002, Vice-Admiral Karimullah was appointed Chief of Naval Staff and was promoted to four-star admiral in the Navy before taking the post. Admiral Karimullah superseded two senior naval officers, Vice-Admiral Taj Khattak, the Vice Chief of Naval Staff (VCNS), and Vice-Admiral G.Z. Malik, the commander of Submarine fleet. During this time, he engaged in talks with the Chinese Navy for a technology transfer for building modern warships in Karachi.

As a response to the Agni-I missile test by India in 2002, Admiral Karimullah began advocating for acquiring the nuclear navy capability but denied deploying nuclear arsenals on the Agosta 90B submarines. Admiral Karimullah ambiguously left the option open and quoted to news media that Pakistan Navy would do so only if "forced to".

In 2003, Admiral Karimullah again secretly pushed the government for the second-strike capability but publicly reiterated that while no such immediate plans existed, Pakistan would not hesitate to take such steps if it felt so compelled. He remained concerned over the expansion of Indian Navy in the region and continued his secret push for acquiring modern weapon systems for the Navy.

In 2004, he successfully negotiated with the U.S. Navy to induct the Navy in the combined maritime force to provide cooperation in regional maritime and security affair. Admiral Karimullah was notably bypassed by President Pervez Musharraf for the chairmanship for the Joint Chiefs of Staff Committee in October 2004. Admiral Karimullah was the most senior-most four-star rank officer in the Pakistani military and was controversially superseded by the junior-most army general, Lieutenant-General Ehsan ul Haq.

In 2005, he began pushing and vigorously lobbying in the government for the extension of Pakistan's seaborne border from 200 to 350 nautical miles for which the claim is to be submitted by May 2009 in accordance with provisions of UN Conventions on Laws of Seas of 1982. It was in 2015 when the borders were extended which pushed Pakistan's area of sea border to 50,000 square kilometres.

Admiral Karimullah retired from the Navy in 2005 and handed over the command of the Navy to Admiral Afzal Tahir who also superseded Vice-Admiral Mohammad Haroon by President Musharraf.

=== Ambassador to Saudi Arabia ===
Having by-passed as Chairman joint chiefs post, President Musharraf announced to appoint Admiral Karimullah for a diplomatic post and appointed him as Pakistan Ambassador to Saudi Arabia. In 2009, he left the post once completing his tenure and returned to Karachi, Sindh, Pakistan.

=== Honors and post retirement ===
Admiral Karimullah is a recipient of Nishan-e-Imtiaz (military), Sitara-i-Imtiaz (military), and Hilal-i-Imtiaz (military)that were decorated to him during his military service.

He was also decorated with the Legion of Merit by the United States, presented to him by US Navy's CNO Admiral Vern Clark in 2004. In 2005, he was conferred with French Legion d'Honneur for promoting Pakistan-Franco naval collaboration in various fields at different posts he held during his service career, including induction of French submarines and aircraft in Pakistan Navy.

On 21 September 2005, Admiral Karimullah was awarded with the Honorary Malaysian Armed Forces Order for Valor award as a Gallant Commander in acknowledgment of his long meritorious services.

After retiring from the foreign service, he apparently joined the "Progress", a public service think tank, and serves on its advisory board. He also remained chairman of Karachi Council on Foreign Relations for some time.

About the Fall of Dhaka in 1971, Admiral Karimullah reportedly was of the view that: History is there to earn lessons from but unfortunately this did not happening in Pakistan". He also remained associate with the Bahria University in Karachi and reportedly maintained in favor of CPEC developmental projects in the country.

== Awards and decorations ==

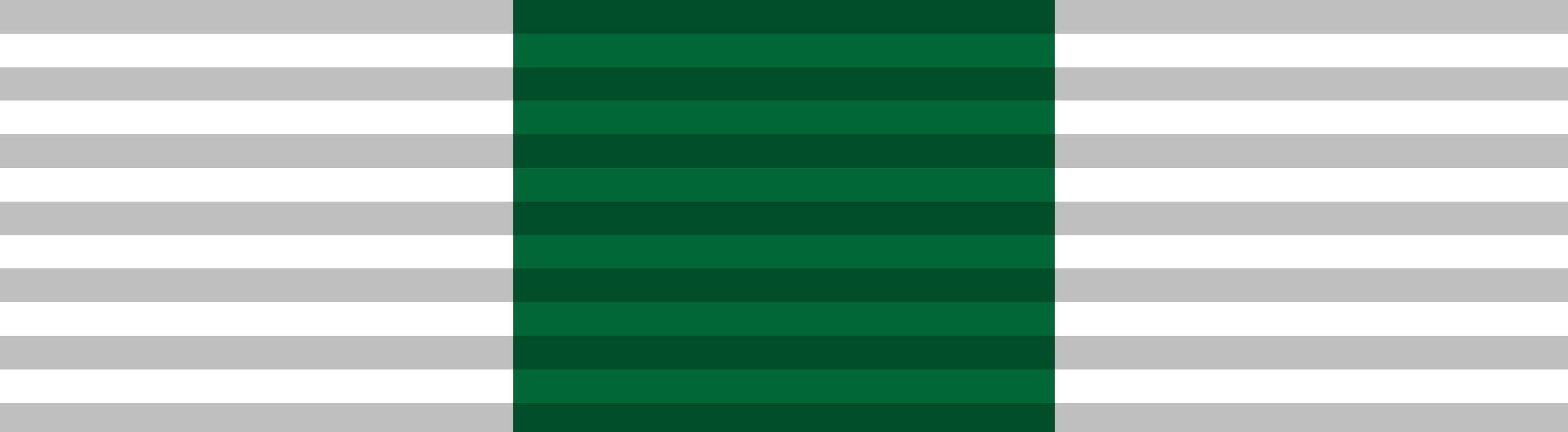

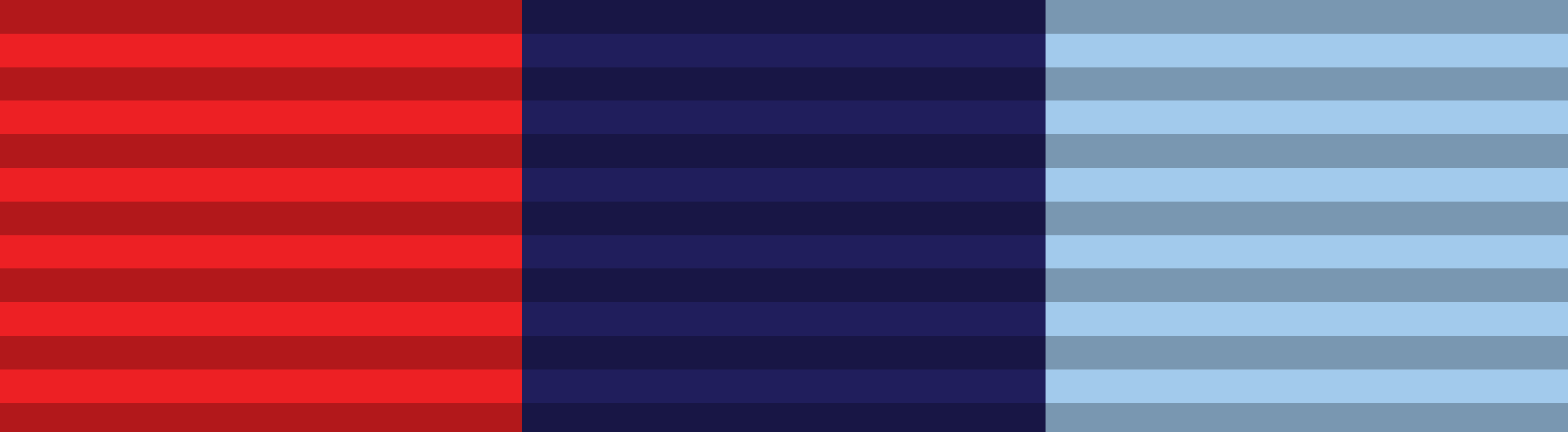

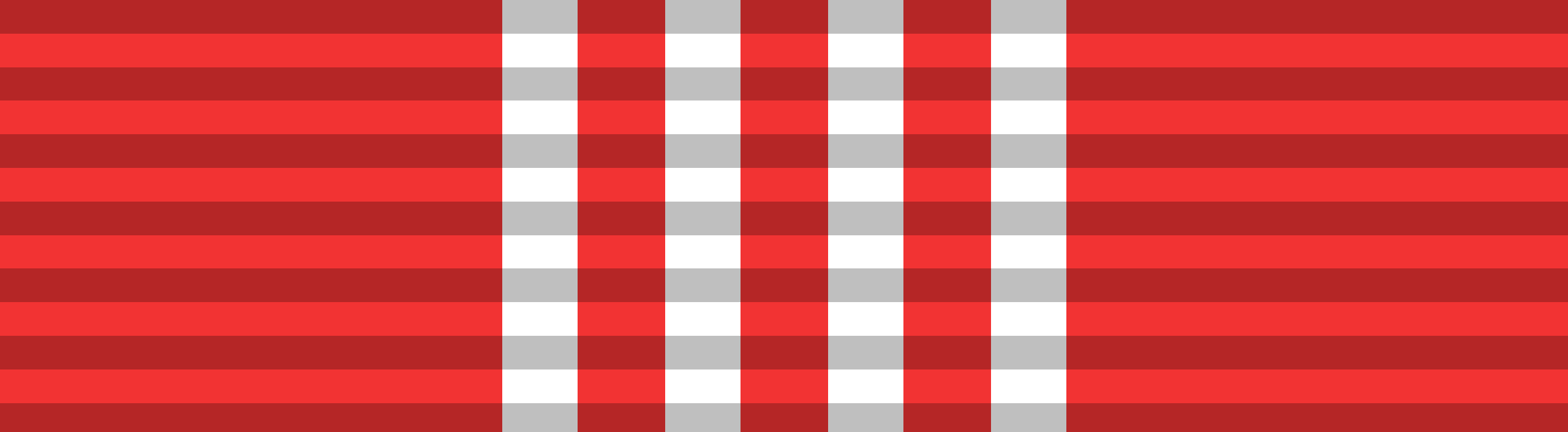

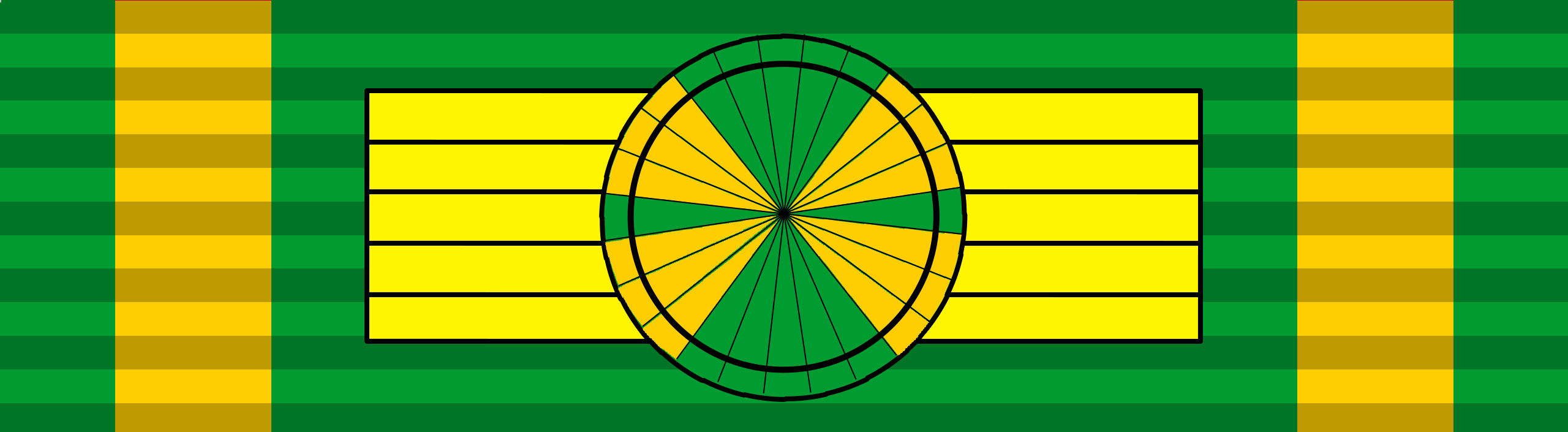

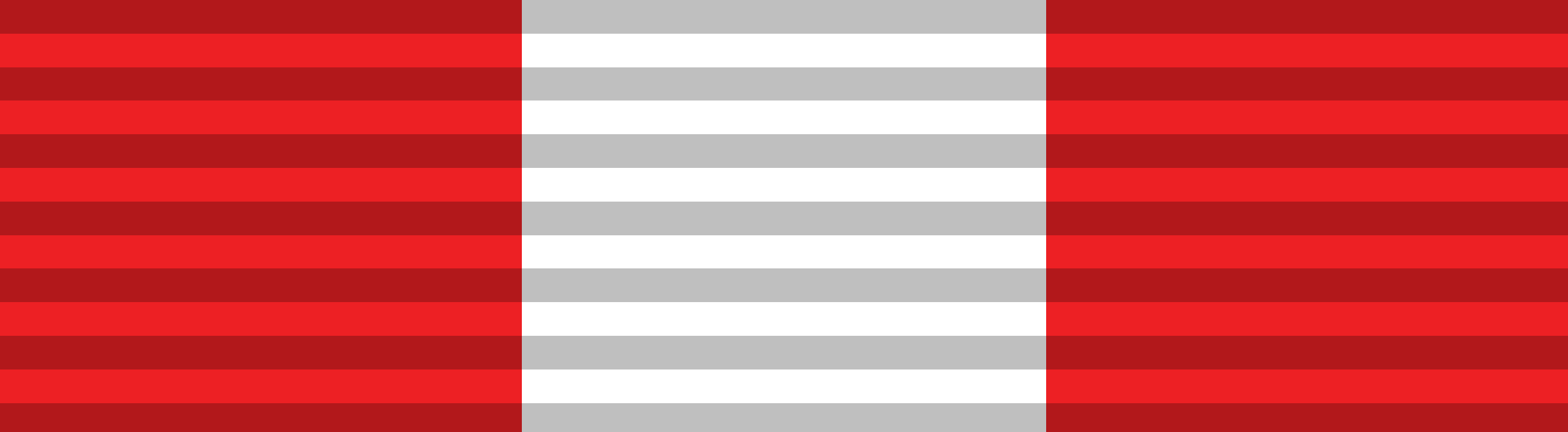

	Nishan-e-Imtiaz (Military) (Order of Excellence)	Hilal-e-Imtiaz (Military) (Crescent of Excellence)	
Sitara-e-Jurat (Star of Courage) 1971	Sitara-e-Imtiaz (Military) (Star of Excellence)	Sitara-e-Harb 1971 War (War Star 1971)	Tamgha-e-Jang 1965 War (War Medal 1965)
Tamgha-e-Jang 1971 War (War Medal 1971)	Tamgha-e-Baqa (Nuclear Test Medal) 1998	Tamgha-e-Istaqlal Pakistan (Escalation with India Medal) 2002	10 Years Service Medal
20 Years Service Medal	30 Years Service Medal	35 Years Service Medal	40 Years Service Medal
Tamgha-e-Sad Saala Jashan-e- Wiladat-e-Quaid-e-Azam (100th Birth Anniversary of Muhammad Ali Jinnah) 1976	Hijri Tamgha (Hijri Medal) 1979	Jamhuriat Tamgha (Democracy Medal) 1988	Qarardad-e-Pakistan Tamgha (Resolution Day Golden Jubilee Medal) 1990
Tamgha-e-Salgirah Pakistan (Independence Day Golden Jubilee Medal) 1997	Abu Dhabi Defence Forces Service Medal (UAE) 1976	Order of King Abdul Aziz (Saudi Arabia)	The Legion of Merit (Degree of Commander) (United States) 2004
Turkish Legion of Merit (Turkey)	Legion of Honour Grand Officer Class (France) 2005	The Order of Military Service Courageous Commander (Malaysia) 2005	Bintang Jalasena Utama (Indonesia)

=== Foreign Decorations ===
Foreign Awards
UAE	Abu Dhabi Defence Forces Service Medal
Saudi Arabia	Order of King Abdul Aziz (4th Class)
United States	The Legion of Merit (Degree of Commander)
Turkey	Turkish Legion of Merit
France	The Legion of Honour (Grand Officer Class)
Malaysia	The Order of Military Service (Courageous Commander)
Indonesia	Bintang Jalasena Utama

== See also ==
- Indian immigration to Pakistan
  - Urdu–speaking people
  - Hyderabadi culture in Pakistan
  - Hyderabadi Muslims
  - Golkonda
  - Hyderabad State
- India
- History of Hyderabad for a history of the city of Hyderabad.
- Hyderabad (India) for the city.

Military offices
Preceded by Abdul Aziz Mirza	Chief of Naval Staff; 2002–2005	Succeeded by Afzal Tahir
