= Mohammad Haroon =

Pakistan Navy admiral

Vice Admrial Mohammad Haroon HI(M) SI(M) TBt
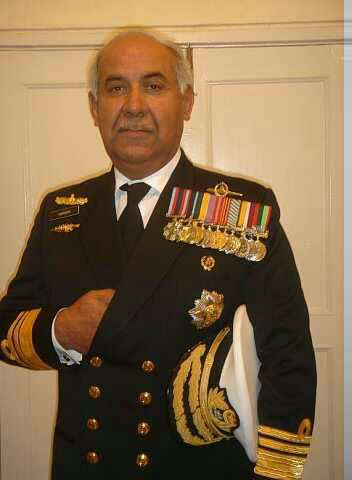
- Vice-Admiral M. Haroon
- Born: Lahore, Punjab
- Military career
- Allegiance: Pakistan
- Branch: Pakistan Navy
- Service years: 1967–2007
- Rank: Vice Admiral
- Service number: PN No. 1241
- Unit: Submarine Service Branch
- Commands: Vice Chief of Naval Staff; Naval Attaché, High Commission of Pakistan in New Delhi; Commander Submarine Service (COMSUBS); Commander Pakistan Fleet
- Conflicts: Indo-Pakistani War of 1971; Indo-Pakistani War of 1999; Indo-Pakistani standoff 2001; 2004 Indian Ocean earthquake and tsunami War on terror
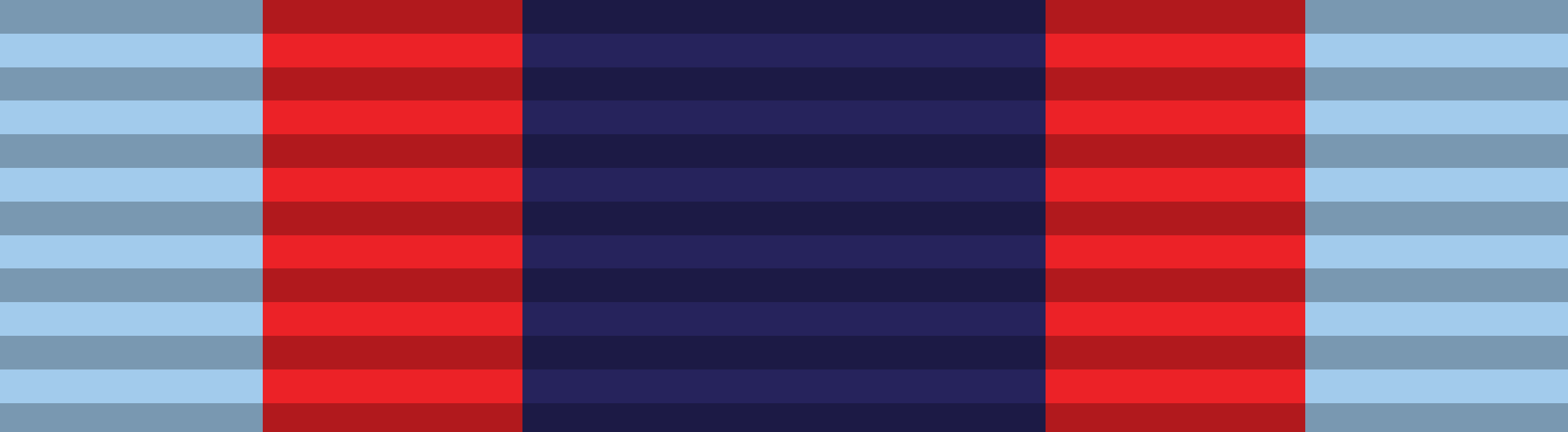
- Awards: Hilal-e-Imtiaz (Military) Sitara-e-Imtiaz (Military) Tamgha-e-Basalat

Mohammad Haroon HI(M) SI(M) TBt (Urdu: محمد ہارون) is a retired three-star rank admiral in the Pakistan Navy and a defence analyst, writing in the Express Tribune.

In 2005, Admiral Haroon was notably superseded by Vice-Admiral Afzal Tahir to the appointment of Chief of Naval Staff as a four-star admiral but continued his service until he reached his set retirement date.

== Biography ==
Mohammad Haroon was born in Lahore, Punjab, initially belonging a village, Alowal, located in District Toba Tek Singh, into a military family; his father served in the Pakistan Army, retiring as major. After his matriculation, he joined the Pakistan Navy in Sub-Lieutenant in 1967, and went to attend the Britannia Naval College where he graduated as underwater specialist in 1970, gaining commission as Lieutenant in the Navy.

Lt. Haroon participated well in the western front of the third war with India in 1971, serving in the PNS Mangro. Before participating, Lt. Haroon did a brief duty in East Pakistan's coastal areas in 1969–70. After the war, his career in the Navy progressed well, eventually Cdr. Haroon commanding a submarine squadron.

He was educated, and graduated in the war studies degree from the National Defence University in Islamabad in the 1970s. He also went to the United States to attend, and graduated from the Naval War College in Rhode Island, United States. Upon returning to Pakistan, he briefly served in the Navy NHQ as Assistant Chief of the Naval Staff (Plans). As Captain in the Navy, he commanded a destroyer and three Hangor-class submarine as his command assignments.

In 1987-90s, Captain Haroon was selected by the Ministry of Defence (MoD) for a diplomatic assignment, and briefly served as naval attaché at the High Commission of Pakistan in New Delhi, India.

In 1996, Cdre Haroon served in the Joint Staff HQ in Rawalpindi as directing staff of war wing, and later served as director joint training.

In 2000–01, Cdre Haroon was promoted to two-star rank, and Rear-Admiral Haroon took over as the commander of the Submarine Command (COMSUBS), actively participating in deploying the submarines during the military standoff with India in 2001. In 2002, Rear-Admiral Haroon was appointed as commander of Karachi (COMKAR), having received the German Navy warship in Karachi coast which paid the farewell visit to Pakistan Navy. In 2003, Rear-Admiral Haroon was promoted to three-star assignment in the Navy.

In 2004–05, Vice-Admiral Haroon was appointed as a senior fleet commander of Pakistan Navy's Fleet (COMPAK). On 7 November 2005, Vice-Admiral Haroon was appointed as Vice Chief of Naval Staff.

In 2005, Vice-Admiral Haroon was notably superseded by Vice-Admiral Afzal Tahir to the four-star rank appointment and as the four-star admiral in the Navy. This promotion for Admiral Afzal Tahir marked with controversy that Admiral Tahir had to clarify his working relationship with Vice-Admiral Haroon, stressing "no differences with Admiral Haroon and had family terms with him." Vice-Admiral Haroon served to complete his tenureship under Admiral Tahir, Chief of Naval Staff, and was eventually retired in 2007.

After retiring from the Navy, Admiral Haroon was invited to be appointed as Rector of the Bahria University in Karachi, and is a regular columnist for country's political correspondents on national security and defence analysis.

== Awards and decorations ==

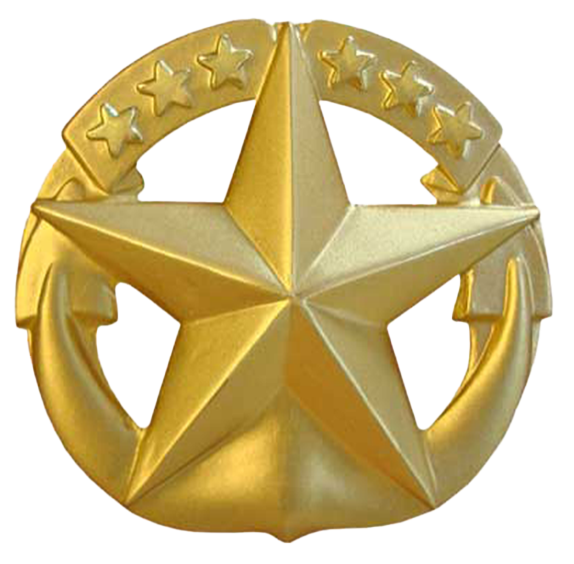

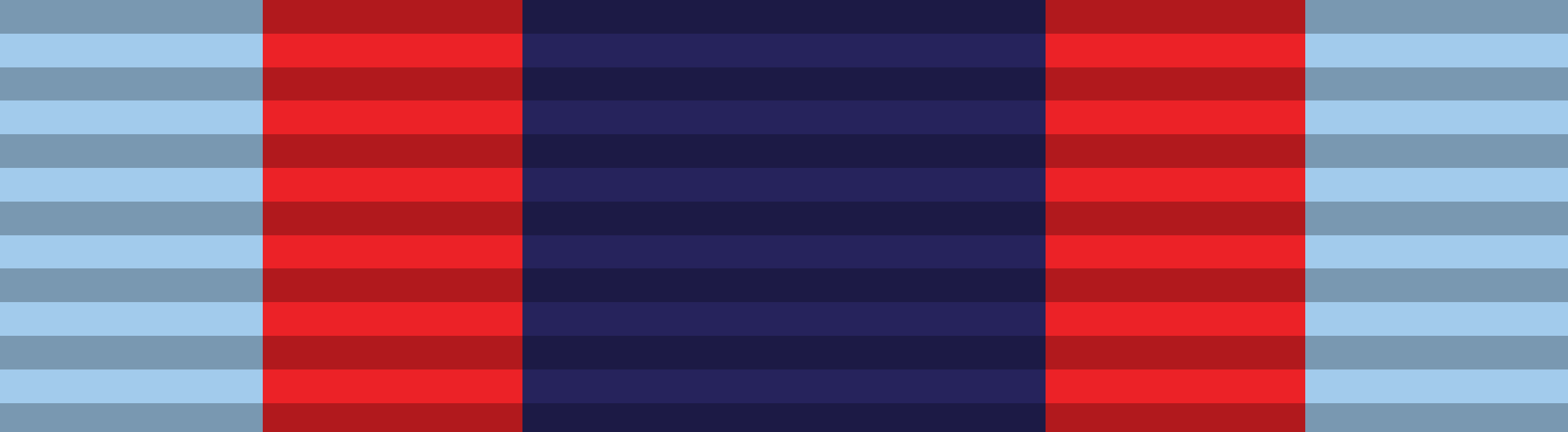

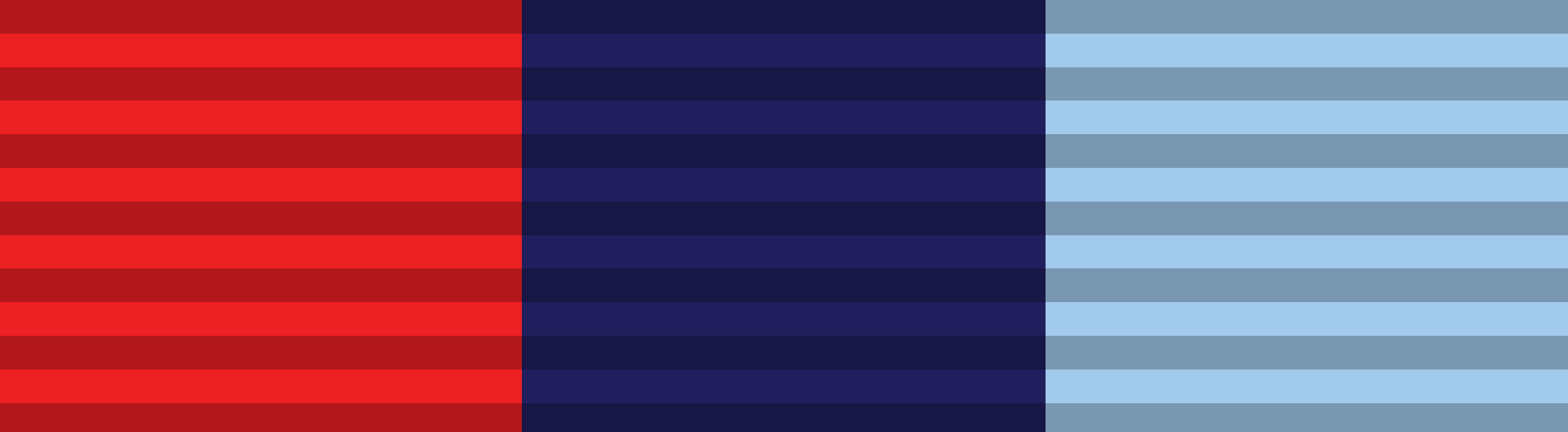

Pakistan Navy Operations Branch Badge
Command at Sea insignia
| | Hilal-e-Imtiaz (Military) (Crescent of Excellence) | | |
| Sitara-e-Imtiaz (Military) (Star of Excellence) | Tamgha-e-Basalat (Medal of Good Conduct) | Sitara-e-Harb 1971 War (War Star 1971) | Tamgha-e-Jang 1971 War (War Medal 1971) |
| Tamgha-e-Baqa (Nuclear Test Medal) 1998 | Tamgha-e-Istaqlal Pakistan (Escalation with India Medal) 2002 | 10 Years Service Medal | 20 Years Service Medal |
| 30 Years Service Medal | 35 Years Service Medal | 40 Years Service Medal | Tamgha-e-Sad Saala Jashan-e- Wiladat-e-Quaid-e-Azam (100th Birth Anniversary of Muhammad Ali Jinnah) 1976 |
| Hijri Tamgha (Hijri Medal) 1979 | Jamhuriat Tamgha (Democracy Medal) 1988 | Qarardad-e-Pakistan Tamgha (Resolution Day Golden Jubilee Medal) 1990 | Tamgha-e-Salgirah Pakistan (Independence Day Golden Jubilee Medal) 1997 |

== Notes ==
Military offices
| Preceded by VADM | Vice Chief of Naval Staff of Pakistan Navy; 7 Nov 2005 – ? | Succeeded by VADM Asaf Humayun |
