= Taj Muhammad Khattak =

Vice Admiral Taj Muhammad Khattal

Chairman of the Port Qasim Authority
- In office 26 November 2002 – 4 November 2005
- Preceded by: RAdm S.V. Naqvi
- Succeeded by: RAdm Saleem Ahmed Mennai

Personal details
- Born: Taj Muhammad Khattak; 20 February 1948 (age 78) Montgomery, Punjab, Pakistan (Now in Sahiwal)
- Citizenship: Pakistan
- Education: National Defence University
- Nickname: TM Khattak

Military service
- Allegiance: Pakistan
- Branch/service: Pakistan Navy
- Years of service: 1965-2005
- Rank: Vice Admiral (S/No. PN 1128)
- Unit: Naval Operations Branch
- Commands: Vice Chief of Naval Staff; Commander Pakistan Fleet; DCNS (Personnel/Materials); Flag Officer Sea Training
- Battles/wars: Indo-Pakistani War of 1965; Indo-Pakistani War of 1971; Bangladesh Liberation War; Indo-Pakistani Standoff 2001
- Awards: Hilal-e-Imtiaz; Sitara-e-Imtiaz; Tamgha-e-Imtiaz; Sitara-i-Jurat; Sword of Honour

Taj Muhammad Khattak (Urdu: تاج محمد خٹک; born 20 February 1948), HI(M). SI(M), SJ, is a retired three-star rank admiral in the Pakistan Navy and a defence analyst, writing columns in the political correspondent, News International.

In addition, he also served as chairman of the Port Qasim Authority from 2002 until 2005, while serving in active duty with the Navy.

== Biography ==
Taj Muhammad Khattak was born in Montgomery, now Sahiwal, Punjab in Pakistan into a Punjabi-Pathan family on 20 February 1948. After his matriculation, he attended the Cadet College in Hasan Abdal and joined the Pakistan Navy in 1965 as Sub-Lieutenant.

He participated well in the second war with India in 1965, and went to train with the Royal Navy to complete his military training, specializing in navigation. In 1969, the Military Academy in Kakul awarded him the Sword of Honour for the best graduates of the academy.

In 1969–70, Lt Khattak was posted in East-Pakistan, joining the crew of PNS Jessor, a gunboat, and served in the Naaf River that located in the East Pakistan–Burma border. He participated in the military operation in Barisal, and notably securing the Biharis who were loyal to Pakistan.

In 1971, Lt. Khattak became the commanding officer of the PNS Jessor, the gunboat, serving and fighting in the Khulna-Mangla-Barisal sector during the civil war in East Pakistan. After the surrendering of the Eastern Command in 1971, Lt. Khattak was taken war prisoner by the Indian Army and held in India for two years. His efforts and action of valor won him the praise from the government, and was honoured with Sitara-i-Jurat in 1971 in his absence. Cdr Khattak served as a commanding officer in the surface warship command, commanding various warships during his career in 1970s.

Upon his repatriated to Pakistan in 1973, and was directed to attend the National Defence University in Islamabad where he attained MSc. in Strategic studies.

In 1990, Commodore Khattak was appointed Naval Secretary at the Navy NHQ, working under Chief of Naval Staff Admiral SM Khan.

His staff appointments included his appointment at the Ministry of Ports and Shipping as an additional secretary, as well as director-general at the Ministry of Communications in 1990s. In 1997, he was promoted as two-star rank admiral, subsequently moved in the Navy NHQ, to be appointed as DCNS (Projects), and later DCNS (Materials) in 1998–99.

In 1999, Rear-Admiral Khattak was appointed as Flag Officer Sea Training (FOST) in the Navy and later elevated as a senior fleet commander in 2000–2001. In 2002, he was promoted to three-star rank, Vice-Admiral, while serving as the senior fleet commander, Commander Pakistan Fleet (COMPAK).

On 26 June 2002, Vice-Admiral Khattak was appointed as Vice Chief of Naval Staff with an immediate effect. Shortly, after his appointment, the Government of Pakistan announced to promote Vice-Admiral Shahid Karimullah as a four-star admiral in the Navy, subsequently appointing him as Chief of Naval Staff on 3 October 2002. The promotion was controversial since Vice-Admiral Khattak was senior to Admiral Karim.ee. Following the news, Vice-Admiral Khattak was then moved as secondment and took over the chairmanship of Port Qasim Authority, which he served until he seek retirement in 2005.

After retiring, he became a defence columnist, writing on country's major political correspondents and currently authoring articles on defence magazines.

== See also ==
- Port of Karachi
- Civil war in East Pakistan
- Pakistani prisoners of war in India
