= Afzal Tahir =

Pakistani admiral

Afzal Tahir NI(M) HI(M) SI(M)
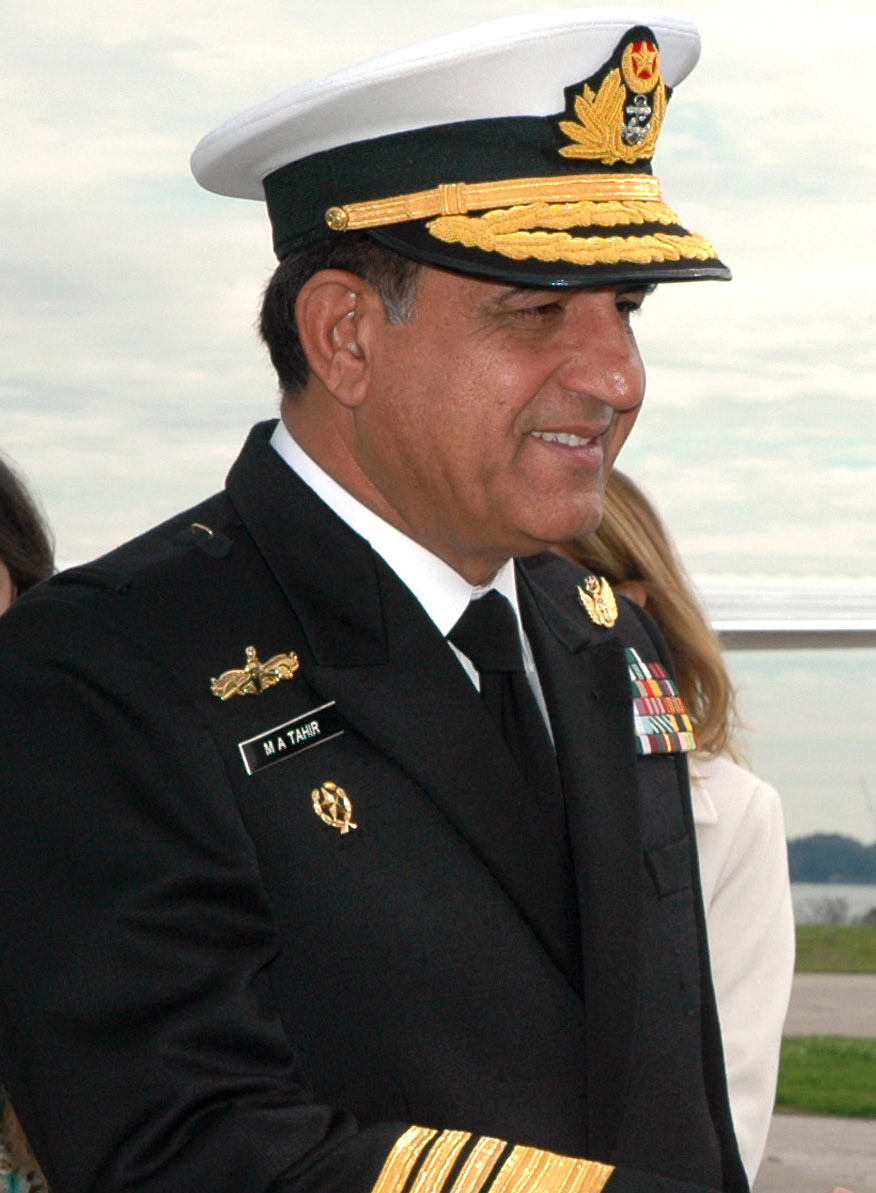

Chief of Naval Staff
- In office 7 October 2005 – 7 October 2008
- Preceded by: Adm. Shahid Karimullah
- Succeeded by: Adm. Noman Bashir

Personal details
- Born: Mohammad Afzal Tahir; 4 January 1949 (age 77) Faisalabad, Punjab, Pakistan
- Citizenship: Pakistan
- Education: National Defence University

Military service
- Allegiance: Pakistan
- Branch/service: Pakistan Navy
- Years of service: 1967–2008
- Rank: Admiral (S/No. PN 1126)
- Unit: Naval Aviation
- Commands: Commander Pakistan Fleet; Commander Naval Aviation; Dir, Inter-Services Intelligence; DCNS (Projects); DCNS (Operations); DCNS (Personnel)
- Battles/wars: Indo-Pakistani War of 1971; Kargil War; 2001 Indo-Pakistan Standoff; War in North-West Pakistan
- Awards: Nishan-e-Imtiaz (Military); Hilal-e-Imtiaz (Military); Sitara-e-Imtiaz (Military); Legion of Merit; Order of King Abdulaziz; Turkish Legion of Merit

Muhammad Afzal Tahir NI(M) HI(M) SI(M) (Urdu: محمد افضل طاهر ; b. 4 January 1949) was a Pakistan Navy admiral, writer, and the military historian currently serving in the faculty at the Naval War College of Pakistan Navy.

Admiral Tahir tenured as the Chief of Naval Staff (CNS) of Pakistan Navy from 7 October 2005 until retiring from his military service on 7 October 2008. Upon the announcement to the four-star appointment in 2005, he superseded Vice-Admiral Mohammad Haroon who continued to serve under him as Vice-Chief of Naval Staff and was succeeded by newly appointed Admiral Noman Bashir in October 2008.

== Biography ==
=== Family background and naval career ===
Muhammad Afzal Tahir was born on 4 January 1949 in Lyallpur (now Faisalabad), Punjab, Pakistan to a Punjabi family who belonged to the Arain tribe. His father was a civil servant in the British Indian government who worked as an administrative officer in the Kapurthala State before the partition of India in 1947.

After the partition that saw the establishment of Pakistan in August 1947, his father joined the Central Superior Services (CSS) and worked as Federal Secretary in various ministerial cabinets.

After graduating from a local high school in Lyallpur, he was commissioned in the Pakistan Navy as a midshipman on 11 May 1967 and was sent to join the Pakistan Military Academy where he did his initial military training. He is the graduate in the class of 40th PMA Long Course and promoted as sub-lieutenant upon his graduation. He did his sea training at the Pakistan Naval Academy in Karachi prior to being promoted as lieutenant in the Navy and inducted in Operations Branch.

He was trained as a surface warship officer and qualified as a naval aviator to fly the Alouette III of Pakistan Army board in the surface warships during the western front of the third war with India in 1971. Lt. Tahir later saw combat action in the naval operations during the third war with India and served on the minesweepers as an executive officer.

After the war, Lt. Tahir joined the naval aviation in 1974 to continue his training as a naval aviator and was appointed as flag lieutenant to Chief of Naval Staff, Admiral K.R. Niazi, from 1981 until 1982. He was promoted as lieutenant-commander in 1982 and was posted in Qatar to serve as a military adviser to Qatar military until 1985 when he returned to Pakistan.

On return from deputation to Qatar in 1985, Lt.Cdr Tahir was appointed Staff Officer (Operations) to the Commander Naval Aviation (COMNAV). During the same time, he was promoted as commander and was appointed as executive officer of a destroyer.

In 1988, Cdr Tahir was sent to attend the Joint Services Staff Course at Joint Services Staff College at Chaklala and upon completion of the course he was appointed to its Directing Staff.

=== Staff and command appointments ===
In 1990, he was promoted as captain and assumed the command of the naval air station, PNS Mehran before commanding the guided missile destroyer in 1992. He was nominated to attend the National Defence University where he gained master's degree in Strategic studies in 1997 and assumed the command of the Naval Aviation as its commander (COMNAV). During the same time, he was promoted as commodore and was the chief of staff to the Commander Pakistan Fleet in 1997.

In 1998, he moved to the Inter-Services Intelligence and briefly served its director in Islamabad and led the intelligence department while stationed in Islamabad. His tenure as an ISI director for Islamabad section witnessed key political events in the country, including the testing program in 1998, leading the ISI intelligence section during the Kargil confrontation in 1999, and the martial law in the country in 1999.

In 2000, Cdre Tahir was promoted as rear-admiral and moved to the Navy NHQ as Deputy Chief of Naval Staff (Operations) and took participation in naval defense preparations during the military standoff between India and Pakistan in 2001. Together with Admiral Shahid Karimullah, he lobbied for notably acquiring the second-strike nuclear capability and reportedly marked: Pakistan navy would soon have "a qualitative edge over a numerically superior enemy" meaning archrival India."

In 2002, Rear-Admiral Tahir was later moved as DCNS (Projects) but later assumed the command of the fleet vessel as Commander Pakistan Fleet (COMPAK), also the same year. He facilitated a visit of Lieutenant-General Earl B. Hailston of U.S. Marines at the Navy NHQ to hold talks on geo-strategic situation in South Asia. In 2003, he was promoted to three-star rank, Vice-Admiral, and moved to the Navy NHQ as DCNS (Personnel). He is a recipient of the Sitara-i-Imtiaz and Hilal-i-Imtiaz.

=== Chief of Naval Staff ===
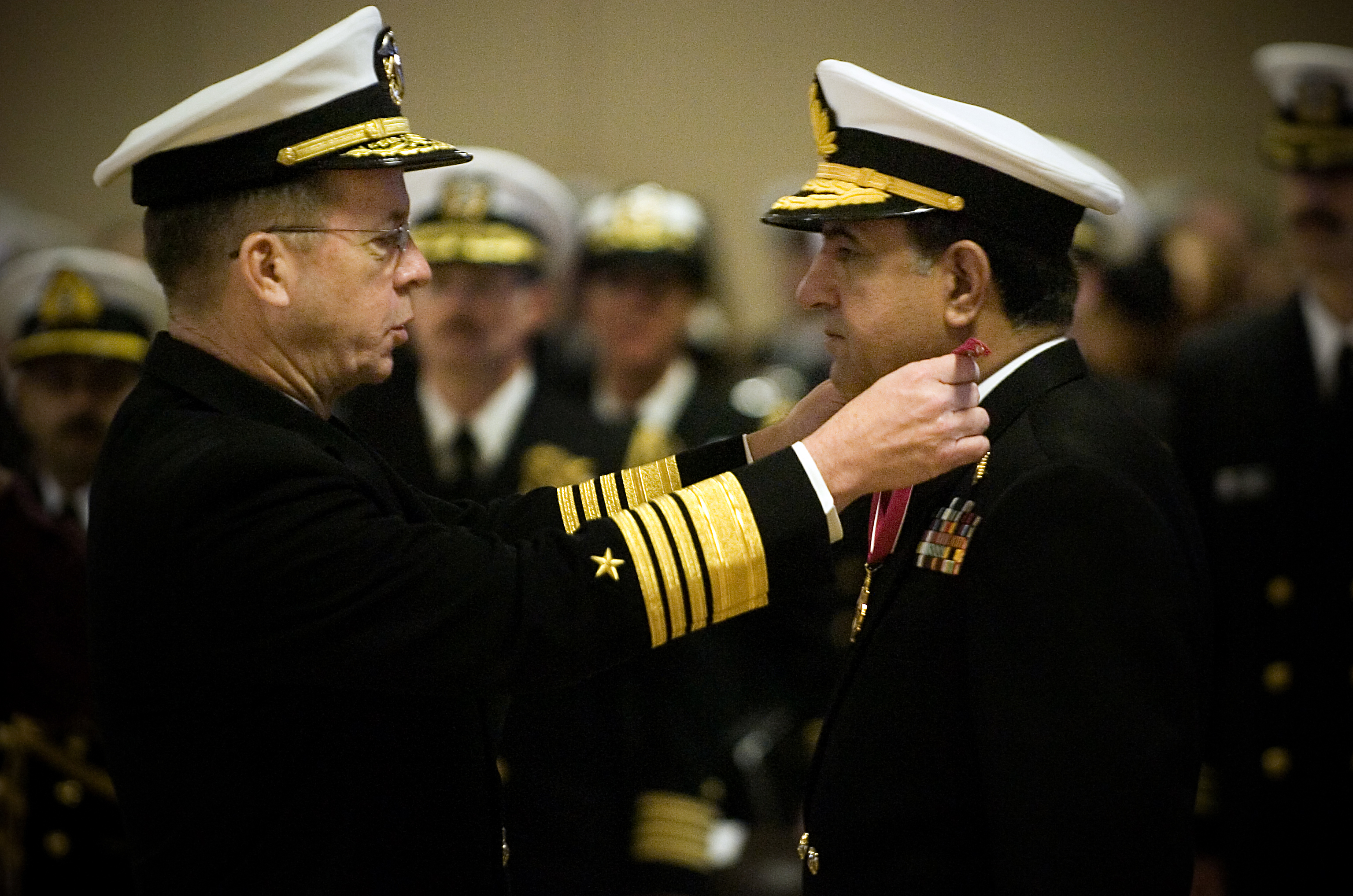
Chief of Naval Operations (CNO) Adm. Mike Mullen presents Pakistan Navy Chief of Naval Staff Adm. Afzal Tahir with the Legion of Merit.

In 2005, Vice-Admiral Tahir was announced to be appointed as the next Chief of Naval Staff by President Pervez Musharraf and promoted as four-star rank Admiral before taking over the command of the Navy from Admiral Shahid Karimullah who was appointed for a diplomatic post in Saudi Arabia.

Admiral Tahir superseded Vice-Admiral Mohammad Haroon who was serving as chief of staff under Admiral Karimullah and was senior to Admiral Tahir. In October 2005, Admiral Tahir assumed the command of the Navy and had Vice-Admiral Haroon to serve on his capacity until retiring from his service.

== Personal life ==
Tahir is a keen sportsman and single-handicap golfer. He belongs to an Arain agriculturalist family of Punjab. He has married twice, and has three daughters and two sons.

== Awards and decorations ==

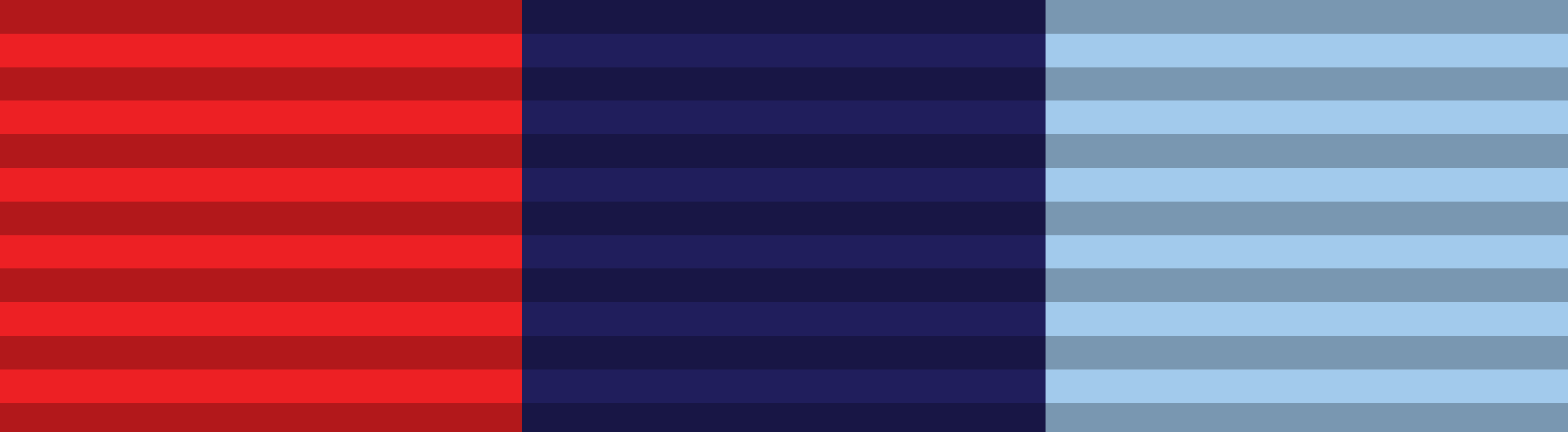

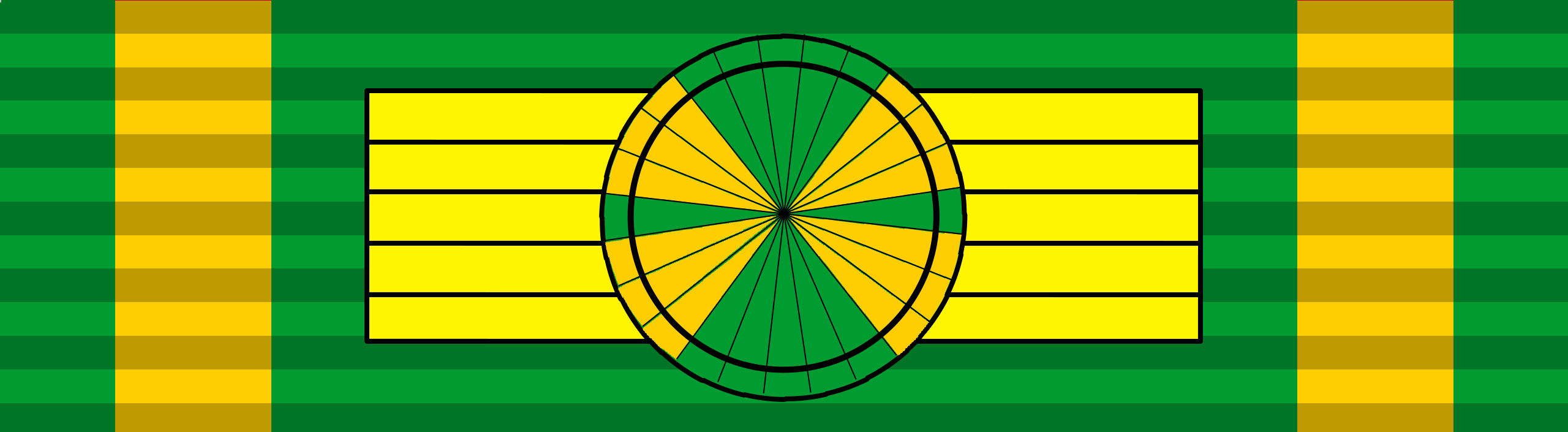

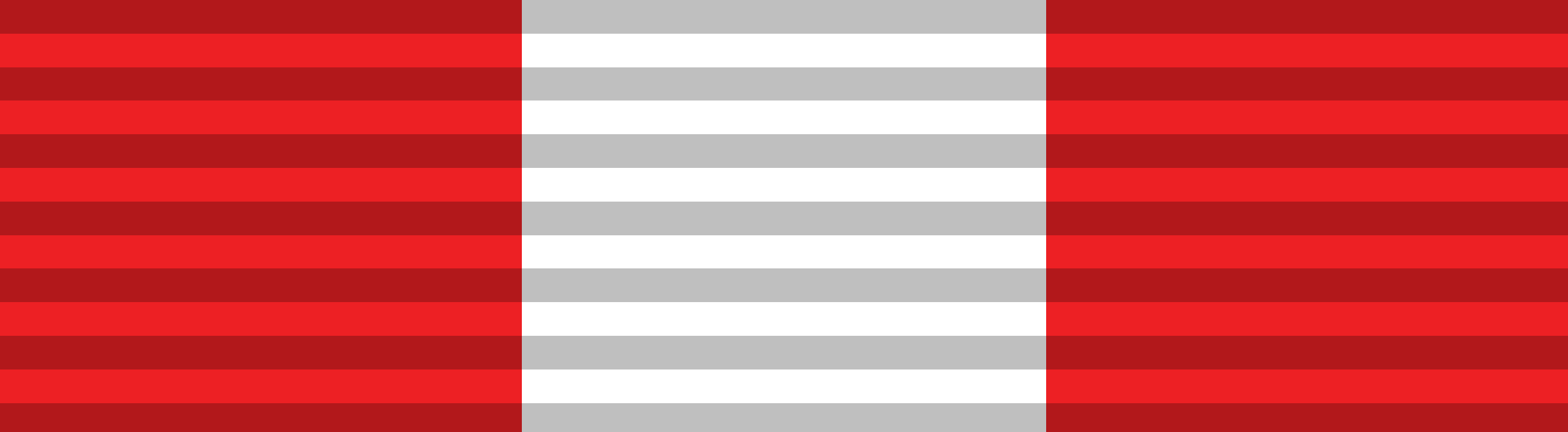

Nishan-e-Imtiaz (Military) (Order of Excellence)	Hilal-e-Imtiaz (Military) (Crescent of Excellence)	Sitara-e-Imtiaz (Military) (Star of Excellence)	Sitara-e-Harb 1971 War (War Star 1971)
Tamgha-e-Jang 1971 War (War Medal 1971)	Tamgha-e-Baqa (Nuclear Test Medal) 1998	Tamgha-e-Istaqlal Pakistan (Escalation with India Medal) 2002	10 Years Service Medal
20 Years Service Medal	30 Years Service Medal	35 Years Service Medal	40 Years Service Medal
Tamgha-e-Sad Saala Jashan-e- Wiladat-e-Quaid-e-Azam (100th Birth Anniversary of Muhammad Ali Jinnah) 1976	Hijri Tamgha (Hijri Medal) 1979	Jamhuriat Tamgha (Democracy Medal) 1988	Qarardad-e-Pakistan Tamgha (Resolution Day Golden Jubilee Medal) 1990
Tamgha-e-Salgirah Pakistan (Independence Day Golden Jubilee Medal) 1997	The Legion of Merit (Degree of Commander) (United States)	Order of King Abdul Aziz (1st Class) (Saudi Arabia)	Turkish 'Legion of Merit' (Turkey)

=== Foreign Decorations ===
Foreign Awards
United States	The Legion of Merit (Degree of Commander)
Saudi Arabia	Order of King Abdul Aziz (1st Class)
Turkey	Turkish Legion of Merit

== See also ==
- Pakistan Navy
- Pakistan Naval Aviation
  - Mirage 5 in the services of Pakistan Navy
  - Aérospatiale Alouette III in Pakistan Navy

Military offices
Preceded by Shahid Karimullah	Chief of Naval Staff; 2005 – 2008	Succeeded by Noman Bashir
