= Alowal =

Alowal Alowal
- Village
- Country: Pakistan
- State: Punjab
- District: Toba Tek Singh
- Time zone: UTCUTC+5:00 (PST)
- PIN: 36050
- Telephone code: 0092-046
- Website: nil

Alowal is a village in Toba Tek Singh District in the Punjab, Pakistan. It is 16 km in North West of Toba Tek Singh, accessible by a good metalled road. It is sandwiched between Jhang Toba road and Akalwala road. The M-4 Motorway is 6 km from Alowal.

Alowal consists of four parts, the main village covering one square area, Basti Odanwali, Basti Kashmerian and Azafi Basti. These parts are under the governance of the main part Alowal. About 5000-6000 people reside in Alowal. This village is linked with Union Council 25 UsmanPur. Alowal is an agricultural land associated with lower Jhang branch.
