= Abdul Aziz Mirza =

Pakistani admiral

Admiral Abdul Aziz Mirza NI(M) HI(M) SI(M) SBt LoM LoH
- عبدالعزيز مرزا

Pakistan Ambassador to Saudi Arabia
- In office 8 October 2002 – 27 January 2005
- Preceded by: Asad Durrani
- Succeeded by: Shahid Karimullah

Chief of Naval Staff
- In office 2 October 1999 – 2 October 2002
- Preceded by: Adm Fasih Bokhari
- Succeeded by: Adm Shahid Karimullah

Personal details
- Born: Abdul Aziz Mirza; 1943 (age 82–83) Rawalpindi, Punjab, British India (Present-day Pakistan)
- Citizenship: British Indian (1939–47); Pakistan (1947 – present)

Military service
- Allegiance: Pakistan
- Branch/service: Pakistan Navy
- Years of service: 1961–2002
- Rank: Admiral
- Unit: Naval Operations Branch
- Commands: Vice-Chief of Naval Staff; DCNS (Operations); Add.Secy. Ministry of Defence
- Battles/wars: Indo-Pakistani War of 1965; Indo-Pakistani War of 1971; Kargil War; Atlantique incident; Indo-Pakistani standoff of 2001
- Awards: Nishan-e-Imtiaz (Military); Hilal-e-Imtiaz (Military); Sitara-e-Imtiaz (Military); Sitara-e-Basalat; Legion of Merit; Tong-il Merit Medal; Legion d'honneur

Abdul Aziz Mirza NI(M) HI(M) SI(M) SBt LoM LoH (Urdu: عبدالعزيز مرزا; born 1943) is a retired Pakistan Navy admiral who served as the 15th Chief of Naval Staff from 1999 until retiring in 2002, after taking over the command of the Navy following the revolt and resignation Admiral Fasih Bokhari over the appointment of Chairman joint chiefs.

After retiring from the Navy, he briefly tenured as the Pakistan Ambassador to Saudi Arabia from 2001 to 2005 and later became the CEO of The Centaurus in Islamabad. During his military service in the Navy, Admiral Mirza is given credit for commissioning the country's first ingeniously and locally built long-range submarine, the Agosta 90B submarine in 1999.

== Biography ==
=== Early life and naval career ===
Abdul Aziz Mirza was born in a small town, Dhamali Kallar Syedan, in Rawalpindi, Punjab, British India, in 1943. He was born into an influential military family, and his father briefly enlisted in the British Indian Army, retiring as chief warrant officer (CWO) in the Frontier Force Regiment of the Pakistan Army.

After he graduated from local high school, he went to attend the Military College Jhelum and secured his graduation before joining the Pakistan Navy in 1961.

After graduation, Mirza applied for the Pakistan Military Academy and was selected with Pervez Musharraf and PQ Mehdi for the interview by the commandants in 1961. After passing the physical, he was studied at the Pakistan Military Academy with Pervez Musharraf who remained his life-long friend and Ali Kuli Khan.

He was later sent to attend the Naval Academy in Turkey where he was trained for his basic training and gained military commission as Sub-Lieutenant in the Naval Operations Branch in the Navy in 1964.

He was trained as a surface warfare officer and participated in second war with India in 1965 against the Indian Navy as a gunnery specialist. In the war of 1965 he served in PNS Dhaka. In 1969–71, Lt. Mirza served in the Submarine Command before reporting at the Naval Base Iqbal where he underwent in training as a military diver and war specialist in the Navy SEALs Teams of the Special Services Group of the Navy, later serving in the Eastern Pakistan where he participating in counter-insurgency operations before being assigned at the Submarine Command.

After the war, he began engage with his studies and went to join the French War College where he graduated with a Master's degree in War studies. In 1980s, he served on the faculty at the Naval War College in Karachi and taught English at the Naval Academy, also in Karachi.

=== Staff and Command appointments ===
During his career in Navy, Mirza commanded two submarines, a guided missile destroyer, and a fleet tanker as an officer in the Navy. In 1990, he was posted at the Navy NHQ as a Naval Secretary, and held officer commanding assignments, first serving as the Flag Officer Commanding (FOC) of the 25th Destroyer Squadron as Commodore in 1993. In 1994, he was promoted as Rear-Admiral and made Additional Secretary at the Ministry of Defence, working on various defence and procurement programmes. In 1994, he led series of complicated and lengthy negotiations, together with Prime Minister Benazir Bhutto, with France over the technology transfer of Agosta 90B class long-range submarines.

It was during this time, he became closer to many politicians and bureaucrats while working on the procurement deals in 1994–97. In 1997, he was appointed as DCNS (Operations) and elevated as Vice Chief of Naval Staff with a rank of Vice-Admiral.

=== Kargil war and Naval chief ===
In 1999, India and Pakistan engaged in military confrontation in Kargil sector, due a misadventure led by then-Chief of army staff General Pervez Musharraf. He did not endorsed the secret infiltration to support General Pervez Musharraf but rather remaining quiet in favor of army chief. Allegations have been levelled against him of misguiding the naval chief Admiral Fasih Bokhari on the matters of Kargil war in favor of army chief, and his revolt against the decision of Prime Minister Nawaz Sharif over the appointment of Chairman joint chiefs.

In 1999, he held a press conference together with Mushahid Hussain Syed, then-Information Minister, and ultimately warned India of escalating the tensions in the region.

On 6 October 1999, he was promoted as four-star rank admiral and appointed Chief of Naval Staff after Admiral Bokharhi prematurely resigned from his commission in protest as the latter was denied the Chairmanship of Joint Chiefs of Staff Committee. Admiral Mirza remained supportive of martial law in 1999, and was said to be closer to Chairman joint chiefs and chief of army staff General Pervez Musharraf. Two weeks later, he was inducted as a senior member in the National Security Council along with Chief of air staff Air Chief Marshal PQ Mehdi. On 4 November 1999, Admiral Mirza released a report of his assets, with General Musharraf also releasing his tax returns papers. In 2000, Admiral Mirza notably announced a deal involving the selling of Agosta-90B Submarines to the Royal Saudi Navy and Royal Malaysian Navy, but the deal never came through as Pakistan imposed an export restrictions.

In 2001, he questioned President Musharraf's decision policy towards the terrorism and military rotation in Western Pakistan, but he was reportedly warned by President Musharraf on his difference of opinion. He reportedly warned of expansion of Indian Navy and noted that the Indian Navy's budget had increased 6,900% since 1971.

He led the Pakistan Navy during the military standoff between India and Pakistan in 2001–02 and boldly stated that Pakistan Navy will hold its own against the Indian Navy. As the naval chief, he is credit of overseeing the development and nationwide construction of the Agosta-90B Khalid-class submarines in various capacities as Pakistan built its first indigenous submarine in 2002.

== Diplomatic and corporate career ==
Admiral Mirza retired from the Navy as its naval chief on 4 October 2002 and handed over the command to Admiral Shahid Karimullah at the ceremony held in Navy NHQ.

On 8 October 2002, President Musharraf announced to appointed Admiral Mirza for a diplomatic post and appointed him as Pakistan Ambassador to Saudi Arabia. In 2005, he oversaw the process of paperworks in order to release the passport of Prime Minister Nawaz Sharif and his family to travel from Jeddah to London.

In 2004, Ambassador Mirza was honored and decorated with the Legion of Honour with an order of Chevalier by the French government; the honor was bestowed to him in Saudi Arabia by the French Ambassador to Saudi Arabia Bernard Polleti. The honor was given in recognition of outstanding contributions to a Pakistani-French joint submarine building program while the ambassador was chief of naval staff of the Pakistan Navy. As an ambassador, Mirza worked towards strengthening the relationship between Pakistan and Saudi Arabia as he focused towards trade agreements and defence cooperation between two countries.

On 26 January 2006, Mirza left the diplomat post and returned to Pakistan as he was replaced by Admiral Shahid Karimullah who took over the diplomatic assignment from him in Riyadh. After his retirement from the diplomatic post, Mirza jointed the corporate sector of the country when he was appointed business adviser to the PakGulf Construction in 2007.

Currently, Mirza is CEO of The Centaurus in Islamabad, overseeing and managing the construction project of a community that integrates residential amenities with other facilities.

== Awards and decorations ==

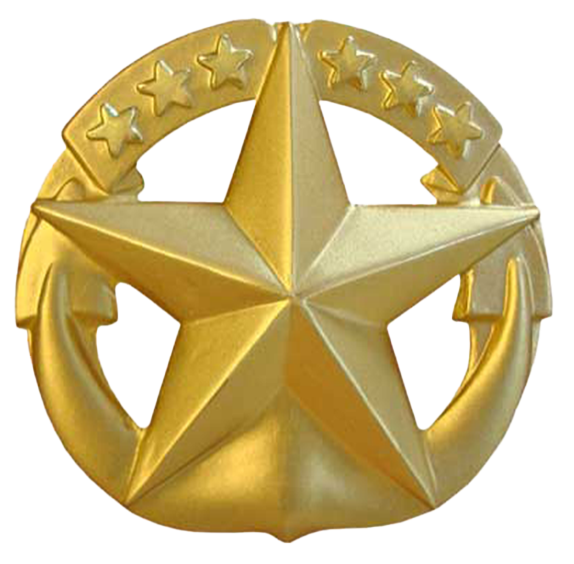

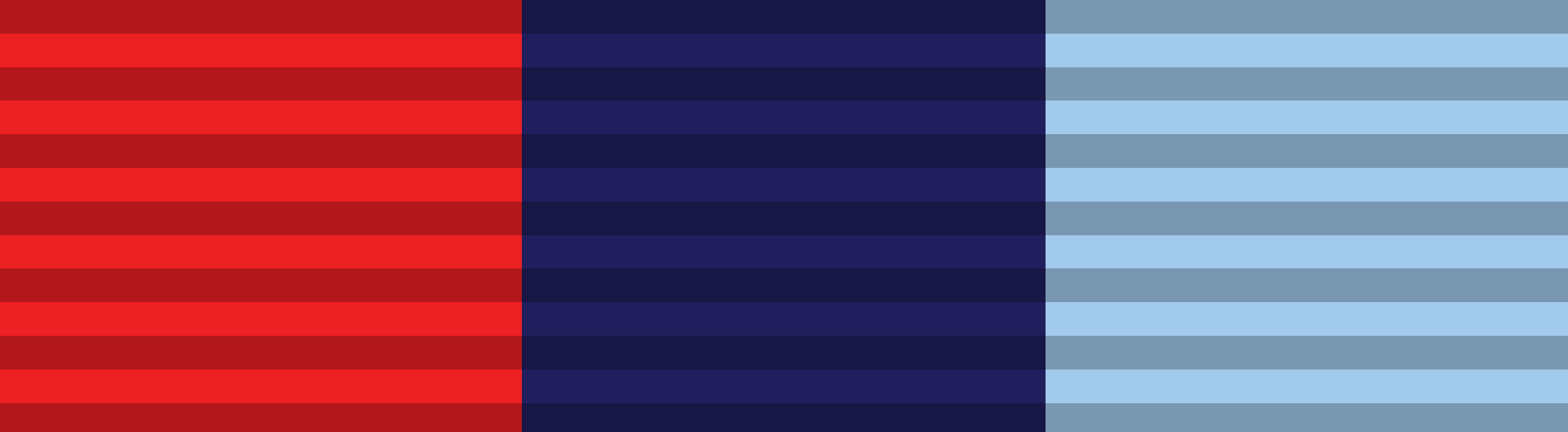

Pakistan Navy Operations Branch Badge
Command at Sea insignia
	Nishan-e-Imtiaz (Military) (Order of Excellence)		
Hilal-e-Imtiaz (Military) (Crescent of Excellence)	Sitara-e-Imtiaz (Military) (Star of Excellence)	Sitara-e-Basalat (Star of Good Conduct)	Sitara-e-Harb 1965 War (War Star 1965)
Sitara-e-Harb 1971 War (War Star 1971)	Tamgha-e-Jang 1965 War (War Medal 1965)	Tamgha-e-Jang 1971 War (War Medal 1971)	Tamgha-e-Baqa (Nuclear Test Medal) 1998
10 Years Service Medal	20 Years Service Medal	30 Years Service Medal	40 Years Service Medal
Tamgha-e-Sad Saala Jashan-e- Wiladat-e-Quaid-e-Azam (100th Birth Anniversary of Muhammad Ali Jinnah) 1976	Hijri Tamgha (Hijri Medal) 1979	Jamhuriat Tamgha (Democracy Medal) 1988	Qarardad-e-Pakistan Tamgha (Resolution Day Golden Jubilee Medal) 1990
Tamgha-e-Salgirah Pakistan (Independence Day Golden Jubilee Medal) 1997	The Legion of Merit (Degree of Commander) (United States)	Tong il Order of National Security Merit (South Korea)	Legion of Honour (Grand Officer) (France)

=== Foreign Decorations ===
Foreign Awards
USA	The Legion of Merit (Degree of Commander)
South Korea	Tong il (Order of National Security Merit)
France	The Legion of Honour (Grand Officer Class)

Military offices
Preceded by Fasih Bokhari	Chief of Naval Staff; 1999–2002	Succeeded by Shahid Karimullah
