= Italian ship USSP =

History

Italy
- Name: USSP
- Namesake: Unità Supporto Subacqueo Polivalente - Multipurpose submarine rescue vessel
- Builder: Fincantieri
- Cost: planned for € (EUR) 434 million
- Status: Financed with 2017's balance law

General characteristics
- Type: Submarine rescue ship
- Displacement: 10.500 t (10.334 long tons) full load
- Length: - 131.5 m (431 ft 5 in) LOA; - 126.8 m (416 ft) LPP
- Beam: 23 m (75 ft 6 in)
- Depth: 9 m (29 ft 6 in)
- Propulsion: - All Electric Plant; - 2 x electric azimuth Pod; - 6 x diesel engine generators (LNG capable diesel generators); - Dynamic Positioning System (DP2); - 2 x Bow Thrusters
- Speed: 18 knots (33 km/h; 21 mph)
- Range: 6,000 nmi (11,000 km; 6,900 mi) to 12 knots (22 km/h; 14 mph)
- Endurance: 30 days
- Complement: - 80 crew; - accommodations for 180
- Sensors & processing systems: - Leonardo CMS SADOC Mk4; - 1 x Leonardo Integrated Int/Ext Communication System; - 1 x Leonardo Air Surveillance Radar; - 1 x Leonardo IFF Interrogator System + Transponder; - 1 x Leonardo EO Surveillance System; - 1 x Leonardo Fire Control System, ADT NG NA-30S Mk2; - 1 x Divers Detection Sonar
- Electronic warfare & decoys: EW system
- Armament: - 1 × Oto Melara 76/62 mm Strales Anti-aircraft gun; - 2 × Oto Melara KBA 25/80 mm, remotized; - 2 x machine gun Browning M2HB 12.7 mm; 2 x Long Range Acoustic Device (Long Range Acoustic System) SITEP MS-424
- Notes: - embarked deployable Submarine Rescue System (SRS), like DRASS Galeazzi SRV-650; - flight deck and facilities for AgustaWestland AW101, SH90A and UAV; - hangar for 1 x AgustaWestland AW101; - Hull, Ice Class I-B+

USSP is a planned submarine rescue ship of the Marina Militare, financed with 2017's balance law. It is expected to replace Italian ship Anteo (A 5309).

== Functions ==
USSP will be a multipurpose ship, thought to accomplish different missions:

- Submarine Rescue, through a deployable Submarine Rescue System (SRS), embarked on the stern portion of the weather deck. The ship is also fitted to host, as an alternative, either NATO Submarine Rescue System (NSRS) or US Navy SRDRS; DRASS Galeazzi SRV-650 is expected as SRS
- Diving Support, through an organic saturation system (SAT), located amidships, which includes two hyperbaric chambers (up to 6 persons each), one transfer under pressure (TUP) system, one hyperbaric boat (up to 16 persons), one working bell (300 m beneath the surface), operated through a dedicated moon-pool
- Hydro-Oceanographic activities, by means of specific sensor suite and hardware, including echo-sounder, Doppler log, Sub bottom profiler, Acoustic Doppler Current Profiler, etc.
- Gruppo Operativo Incursori support, by hosting and deploying special forces and relevant equipment.

== History ==
USSP program beginning on 2010 when parliamentary defence commission approved the act "Programma pluriennale di A/R n. SMD 02/2010, relativo all'acquisizione di un'unità navale di supporto subacqueo polivalente di ARS/NAI" (Multi-year program for multi-purpose Submarine support naval unit). ARS/NAI vessel was fitted for a cost of € (EUR) 125 million, then updated to 300 and, finally, to 434 million Euros.

In June 2021, the contract was awarded to the Mariotti shipyard in Genoa.

== Sensors ==
- 2 x High Precision Acoustic Positioning
- 1 x Single Beam Echo-Sound
- 3 x Multi Beam Echo-Sound
- 3 x Side Scan Sonars
- 1 x Sub Bottom Profiler
- 1 x Underwater Telephone
- 2 x Acoustic Doppler Current Profilers
- 3 x Current Profilers
- 1 x Wave Buoy
- 1 x Gradiometer
- 1 x Marine Magnetometer
- 1 x Gravimeter System
- 1 x Vibrocorer
- 3 x Grab Samplers
- 1 x Box Corer
- 1 x Corer
- 1 x CTD Sounder
- 1 x Doppler Log
- 1 x Expendable Bathythermograph

== Deployable equipment ==
- 1 x McCann Rescue Chamber
- 1 x Ventilation system for damaged
- 1 x submarine control of depressurization included
- 1 x ADS - Atmospheric diving suit
- 1 x ROV Remotely Operated Vehicle working 3,000 m (9,842 ft 6 in)
- 1 x ROV watching 3,000 m (9,842 ft 6 in)
- 1 x ROV light working 1,000 m (3,280 ft 10 in)
- 1 x AUV Autonomous Underwater Vehicle 3,000 m (9,842 ft 6 in)

== See also ==
- SRV-300
- COMSUBIN
