= SX-404-class submarine =

Class overview
- Builders: Cos.Mo.S in Livorno, Italy
- Operators: Pakistan Navy; Republic of China Navy; Colombian National Navy
- Succeeded by: Cosmos class
- Built: 1966–1972
- In commission: 1972–1993
- Completed: 10
- Lost: 1
- Scrapped: 4
- Preserved: 1

General characteristics
- Type: SDV/Midget submarine
- Displacement: 41 t (40 long tons; 45 short tons)
- Length: 16 m (52 ft 6 in)
- Beam: 2 m (6 ft 7 in)
- Propulsion: Diesel-electric
- Speed: Surfaced: 11 knots (20 km/h; 13 mph); Submerged: 6 knots (11 km/h; 6.9 mph)
- Range: 1,200 miles (1,900 km)
- Endurance: 14 days
- Test depth: 100 m (328 ft)
- Complement: 16, (4 operations, 3 SEAL Teams)

The SX-404-class submarine, was a class of midget submarines produced by the Italian firm Cos.Mo.S.

== Overview ==
The 70-ton SX-404 can carry two Cosmos CE2F series swimmer delivery vehicles externally.

== Pakistan ==
In 1965, the Pakistan Navy was given authorization by the Ministry of Defense to award the contract to the Italian shipbuilding company, the Cos.Mo.S., designed the SX-404-class midget submarine for the purposes of the diver propulsion vehicle in 1965. The SX-404 submarine program had a strong preference over the Hangor-class submarine that was being built in France but there were severe problems encountered when the torpedo required according to the Pakistan Navy's standard could not be compatible with the SX-404 design.

The SX-404 class were some of the smallest submarines in the world at the time, but could still carry twelve passengers, making them invaluable for raids and reconnaissance in shallow water.

The SX-404-class submarines were intended to be use as the diver propulsion vehicle for the SEAL Teams in the Navy Special Service Group, and were delivered in September 1971 but there were problems encountered providing the cover for the Hangor-class submarines (the motherships) continued until these problems were resolved in December 1971.

Between the 1972–73, Pakistan Navy commissioned six more SX-404-class submarine that was bought from the Italian shipbuilding company, the Cosmos Spa., with their main function of transporting a twelve Navy SEAL Team members on a reconnaissance missions. In 1976, there was one submarine that was lost in an accident while two were decommissioned for scrap metals in 1982–83.

The entire program of SX-404-class submarines were eventually phased out and decommissioned from her military service with the Navy in 1990 with the remaining three submarines– two were sold for scrap metal while one was preserved at the Navy Museum in Karachi, Sindh in Pakistan. The SX-404-class submarine program was phased out with the development of the Cosmos-class submarine in 1990.

== Republic of China ==
Taiwan ordered two SX-404s and they were delivered in the mid-1960s. They were retired in 1973 when larger ex-USN submarines became available.
