= Marino-class diving support vessel =

Class overview
- Name: Marino class
- Builders: Crestitalia shipyard, Ameglia (La Spezia)
- Operators: Italian Navy
- In commission: 1985
- Planned: 2
- Completed: 2
- Active: 2

General characteristics
- Type: Diving support vessel
- Displacement: 97 t (95 long tons) full load
- Length: 25.8 m (85 ft)
- Beam: 6.9 m (23 ft)
- Draught: 1.2 m (3.9 ft)
- Propulsion: 2 x Diesel engines Isotta Fraschini ID-36-SS12V (559 kW (750 hp) each)
- Speed: 28 knots (52 km/h; 32 mph)
- Range: 240 nautical miles (440 km; 280 mi)
- Crew: 9; 1 official; 8 sailors
- Sensors & processing systems: 2 x GEM Elettronica SPN-753 navigation radar, X band
- Notes: hyperbaric chamber on Alcide Pedretti

The Marino class of diving support vessels consists of two units operated by the Italian Marina Militare. The vessels are used by Comando Subacquei Incursori (COMSUBIN) for training and operational duties and are named MAS Motoscafo Appoggio Subacquei (DSV Diving Support Vessel).

== Features ==
Alcide Pederetti is assigned to diving support and for submarine rescue operations It's fitted with:

- a hyperbaric chamber DRASS Galeazzi, for 4+2 persons.
- diving support equipment, until -80 m deep.

== Ships ==
Italian Navy - Marino class
| Name | Pennant number | Initial number | Laid down | Launched | Commissioned | Motto |
|---|---|---|---|---|---|---|
| Mario Marino | Y 498 | MEN 213 | | 1984 | 1985 | Semper |
| Alcide Pedretti | Y 499 | MEN 214 | | 17 May 1984 | 4 May 1985 | Semper |
