= Cosmos-class submarine =

Midget submarine class

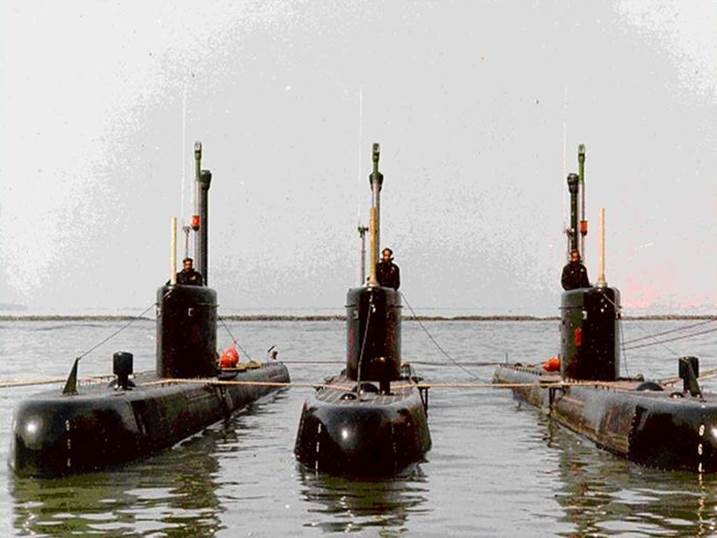

Class overview
- Builders: Design: Cos.Mo.S in Livorno, Italy; Construction and Design: KS&EW Ltd. in Karachi, Pakistan
- Operators: Pakistan Navy
- Preceded by: SX-404 class
- Succeeded by: Dolgorae class (South Korea)
- Built: 1993–96
- Planned: 3
- Completed: 3
- Active: 3

General characteristics
- Type: SDV/Midget submarine
- Displacement: Surfaced: 102 tons; Submerged: 110 tons
- Length: 28 m (91 ft 10 in)
- Beam: 2.30 m (7 ft 7 in)
- Draft: 5.59 m (18 ft 4 in)
- Propulsion: Diesel-electric
- Speed: Surfaced: 9 knots (17 km/h; 10 mph); Submerged: 6.0 knots (11.1 km/h; 6.9 mph)
- Range: 2,500 miles (4,000 km)
- Endurance: 20 days
- Test depth: 110 m (360 ft)
- Complement: 14, (6 operations, 2 SEAL Teams)
- Armament: Torpedo tubes; Mine laying hooks

The Cosmos-class submarine, officially Cos.Mo.S MG-110 locally designated as X-Craft, are a class of midget submarines designed by the Italian firm Cos.Mo.S, in Karachi Naval Dockyard, Pakistan.

The Cosmos-class submarines are currently stationed in PNS Iqbal and are used as the SDV for the SEAL Teams of the Navy Special Service Group, since 1993. Despite classified as submarine by its builder in Karachi, the Cosmos, nonetheless, fall under the responsibility of the Naval Strategic Forces Command for planning development while the Commander of the Coastal Areas remains in charge for the operational deployments only.

== Design overview ==
Design was initially conceived in 1983–85 in Italy for the COMSUBIN (special forces) of the Marina Militare (Italian Navy), which was already operating a large fleet of midget class submarines in their inventory. The Italian firm, Cosmos, had initially designed for the eight submarines, along with the designs of three Dolgorae-class submarine for the Republic of Korea Navy in 1983.

The Cosmos-class submarines are 28 m (91 ft 10 in) (sources vary with GlobalSecurity.org noting the length at 27.25 m (89 ft 5 in)) long, and with one propeller that is powered by a diesel-electric engine. The Cosmos are more capable of conducting the operations than their predecessor design, the SX-404-class submarine in 1970s. The submarine range is between 1,800 miles (2,897 km) at 6.0 knots (11.1 km/h; 6.9 mph) in diving capability and has an endurance of up to twenty days in sea. The Cosmos can launch the Mark 5 torpedo from the standard 533 mm torpedo tubes according to the research paper published by Massimo Annati in 1996 at the United States Naval Academy in the U.S. state of Maryland.

In 1990, the Pakistan Navy entered in discussion with the Marina Militare (Italian Navy) of procuring these submarines in a view of decommissioning the SX-404-class submarines that was bought from Italy in 1970. The three designs of the Cosmos were originally intended for the export to the Republic of Korea Navy in 1983, which was already seeking the Dolgorae design.

In 1990s, Pakistan bought the proprietary designs and had the engineers from the Italian firm, the Cosmos Spa, to re-design and constructed the Cosmos-class submarines in a joint venture with the KS&EW Ltd. at the Karachi Naval Dockyard in Karachi, Sindh, Pakistan. The KS&EW Ltd. received the production license for the Cosmos for export from her manufacturer and the first ship of her class was commissioned in the Navy in 1993. Two other submarines were entered in service in 1993 and 1996 respectively. The Cosmos serves as the swimmer delivery vehicle (SDV) for the Navy Special Service Group and were initially under their control until 2005 while stationed at PNS Iqbal in Karachi.

In 2005, the Cosmos control was given to the Commander Submarines (COMSUBS) for the operational deployments but later the control of the submarines were given back to the Navy Special Service Group under Command of the Coastal Areas (COMCOAST) for operational deployment while its engineering and maintenance remains under the Naval Strategic Forces Command.

As of 2019, there are three Cosmos-class submarines that are active in the Navy as shown below:

Name	Builder	Launched	Commissioned	Decommissioned	Status
—	KS&EW Ltd.		1993	—	Active
—	KS&EW Ltd.		1993	—	Active
—	KS&EW Ltd.	1993	1996	—	Active

Source: MG110 Cosmos/X-Craft by globalsecurity.org
