= Italian ship Anteo (A 5309) =

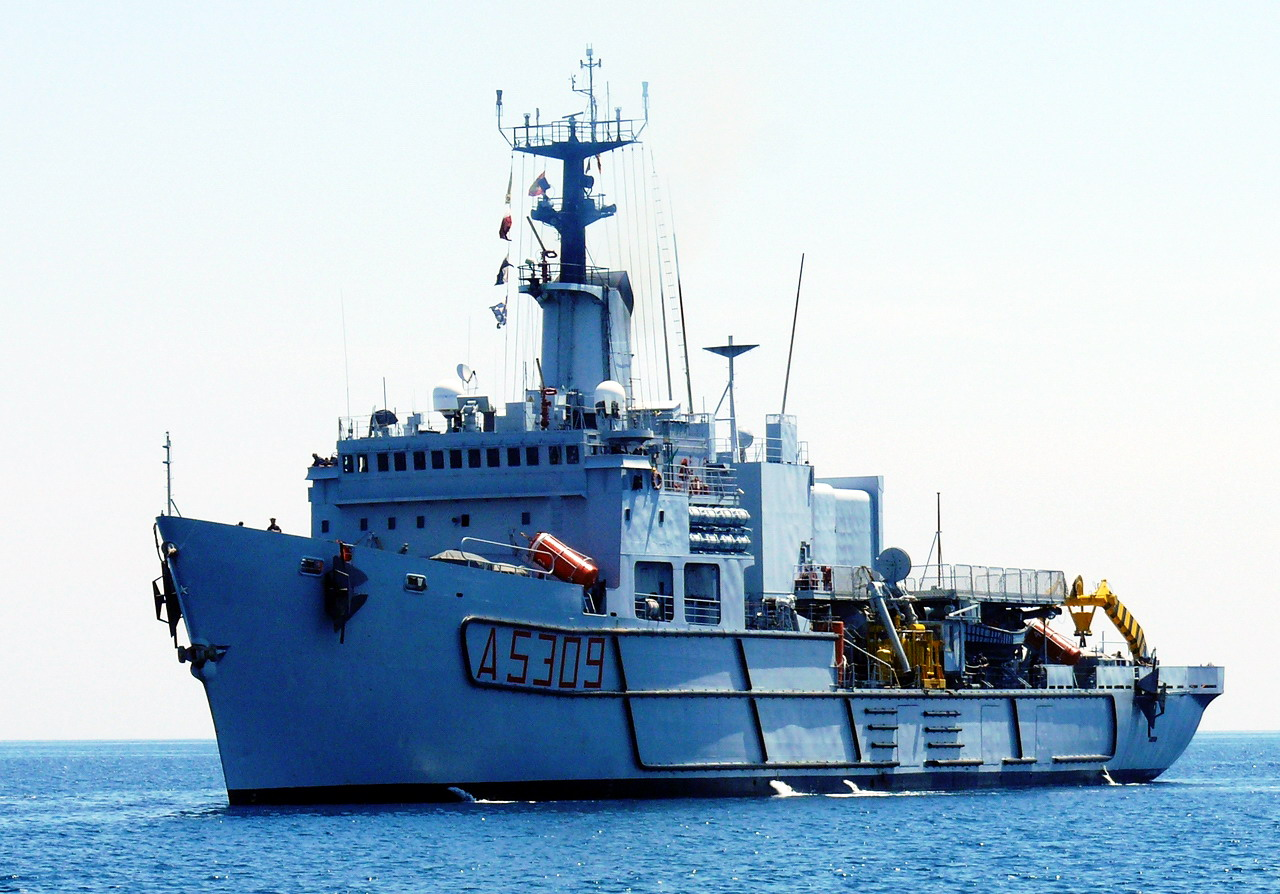
- Anteo A 5309

History

Italy
- Name: Anteo
- Builder: Cantiere Navale Ernesto Breda, Marghera, (Venezia)
- Laid down: 20 July 1977
- Launched: 11 November 1978
- Commissioned: 31 July 1980
- In service: 1
- Home port: La Spezia
- Identification: Pennant number: A 5309; Hull number: 285; MMSI number: 247904000
- Motto: In undis per undas pro vita
- Status: Active

General characteristics
- Type: submarine rescue ship
- Displacement: 3,874 tonnes (full-load).
- Length: 98.4 m (322 ft 10 in)
- Beam: 15.8 m (51 ft 10 in)
- Draught: 6.5 m (21 ft 4 in)
- Propulsion: 3 x diesel generators GMT A-230-12 (1,560 kW each); 2 x electric engine Magneti Marelli (4,410 kW); 1 x shaft; 2 x bow thrusters
- Speed: 20 knots (37 km/h; 23 mph)
- Range: 10,500 nmi (19,400 km; 12,100 mi) at 11 knots (20 km/h; 13 mph); 4,000 nmi (7,400 km; 4,600 mi) at 14 knots (26 km/h; 16 mph)
- Complement: 141
- Sensors & processing systems: 2 x GEM Elettronica navigation radars AN/SPN-748
- Armament: 2 × Oerlikon 20/70 mm or Browning M2HB 12,7 mm
- Notes: - flight deck; - retractile hangar for one medium helicopter (AB-212 class); - 1 x 12 t crane; - 1 × 6 t crane

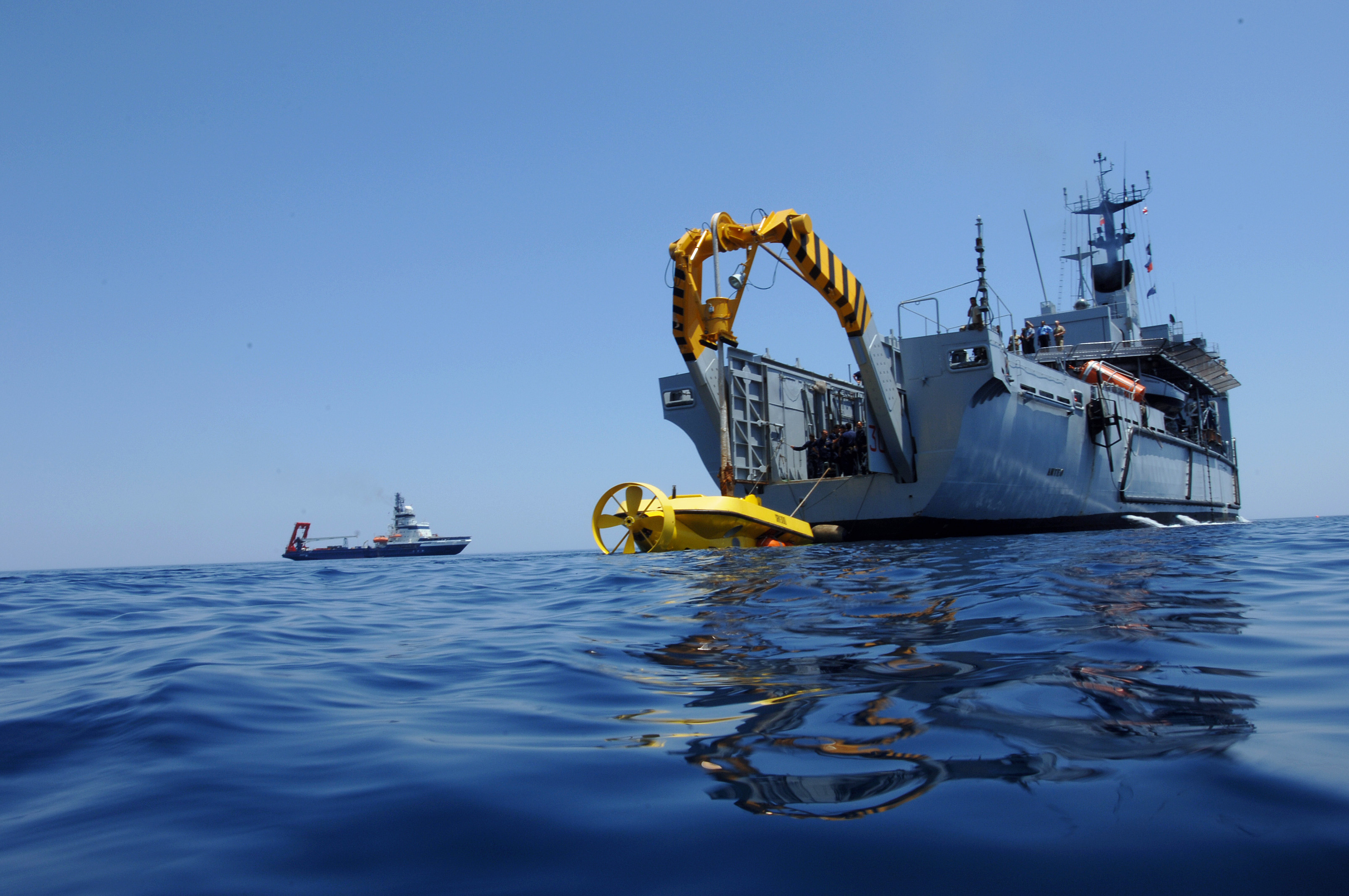
SRV-300 is launched from Anteo, 2005

Anteo (A 5309) is a submarine rescue ship of the Italian Navy, assigned to Raggruppamento Subacquei ed Incursori "Teseo Tesei" (COMSUBIN). Anteo is the third ship to bear this name in the Italian Navy. The ship's design was developed by the "Ufficio Navi Speciali del Reparto Progetti Navi" (Special Office of the Ships Projects Division), according to the guidelines provided by the Navy General Staff. The ship was built at Cantiere Navale Breda di Porto Marghera and commissioned to the Italian Navy on 31 July 1980.

== Characteristics ==
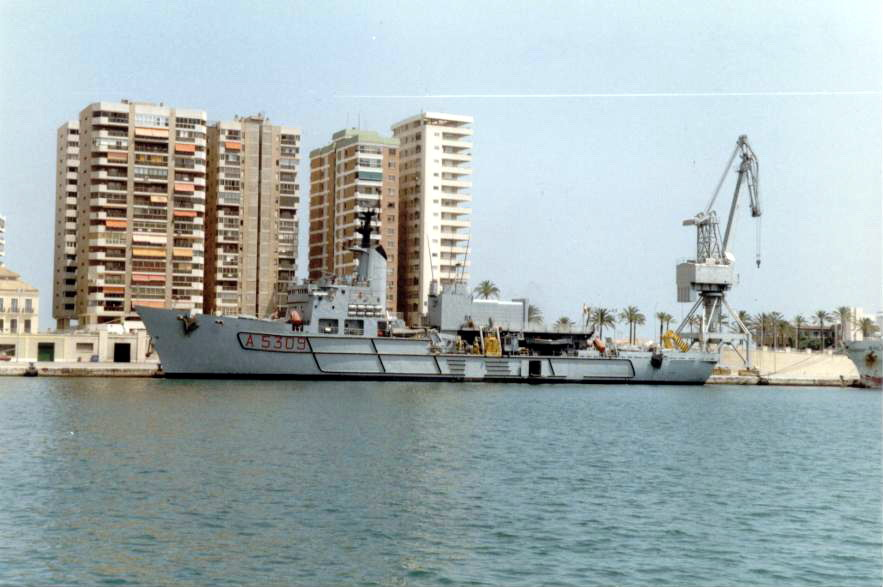
Anteo at Málaga

It is fitted with:

- SDC system for submarine rescue up to 250 m deep
- SRC Submarine Rescue Chamber: Mc-Cann rescue bell, for submarine rescue up to 120 m deep; height: 4 m, diameter: 2,20 m, displacement 9,5 tonnes, 6 survivors per cycle;
- DRASS Galeazzi SRV-300 deep-submergence rescue vehicle for submarine rescue up to 300 m deep; 12 survivors per cycle; length overall 8.46 m, width overall 3.13 m, height (without skirt) 3.17 m, displacement 27.3 tonnes (since 1980 and until 2002 was used Breda MSM-1S USEL deep-submergence rescue vehicle);
- 3 x hardsuit atmospheric diving suit (ADS) systems of Oceanworks International for submarine rescue up to 300 m deep
- 1 x SAAB Seaeye Falcon ROV
- 1 x Gaymarine Pluto ROV
- 1 x hull mounted Konsberg Simrad EM 1002 multi beam sonar
- 1 x DRASS Galeazzi compression chamber for 12 persons
- 2 x DRASS Galeazzi compression chambers for 6 and 3 persons

== See also ==
- deep-submergence rescue vehicle DRASS Galeazzi SRV-300
- deep-submergence rescue vehicle Breda MSM-1S USEL
- COMSUBIN
- Italian ship USSP
