= MSM-1 =

Italian deep-submergence rescue vehicle

History

Italy
- Name: MSM-1 USEL (Unità Soccorso E Lavoro)
- Namesake: Woodstock (Peanuts)
- Builder: Cantieri Navali Ernesto Breda, Marghera (Venezia)
- Launched: 1977
- Commissioned: 1980
- Decommissioned: 2002

General characteristics
- Class & type: Deep submergence rescue vehicle
- Displacement: 12.0 tons
- Length: 8.0 m (26.2 ft)
- Beam: 1.9 m (6.2 ft)
- Height: 2.7 m (8.9 ft)
- Propulsion: Hydraulic motors
- Speed: +5 knots (9.3 km/h; 5.8 mph) max speed; 2 knots (3.7 km/h; 2.3 mph) cruise speed
- Endurance: 8 hours at 2 knots (3.7 km/h; 2.3 mph); 120 hours in emergency with only 2 pilots on-board
- Test depth: 600 m (2,000 ft) (operating); +900 m (3,000 ft) (collapse depth)
- Capacity: 8 rescuees
- Complement: 2
- Sensors & processing systems: Echo-sounder ELAC LAZ-100; TV camera; Underwater telephone
- Notes: pressure hull was made of HY-80 steel

MSM-1 USEL (Unità di Soccorso E Lavoro - Rescue and Work Vessel) was a deep-submergence rescue vehicle (DSRV) that was rated to dive up to 600 m (1,969 ft). It was built by Cantieri Navali Ernesto Breda/Fincantieri for the Marina Militare. The sub was capable of descending to 600 metres (2,000 ft) below the surface and could carry 8 passengers at a time in addition to her crew. MSM-1 USEL was hosted by mother ship Anteo at La Spezia from 1980 to 2002. That year MSM-1 USEL was replaced by the DRASS Galeazzi SRV-300.

== Characteristics ==
MSM-1 USEL was the first submersible vehicle for underwater research and work of completely Italian conception. The basic design of MSM-1 USEL was done by ESCO of Milan. The pressure hull is made of HY-80 steel and subdivided in two compartments: a cylinder with hemispherical ends located aft, and a sphere forward, interconnected by a cylindrical tunnel. The afterbody is tapered and finishes with the propeller cone. Aft stability planes, two vertical and two horizontal, are arranged forward of the propeller.

== History ==
MSM-1 was updated (MLU - MidLife Update) in 1989 by MARITALIA of Fiumicino. Work took a year to complete and the vessel was renamed MSM-1S USEL. The DSRV's maximum depth was established near Cinqueterre (La Spezia) at 480 m (1,575 ft).

== Museum ==
Since 8 September 2015 MSM-1S USEL has been held by the Museo Tecnico Navale (Naval Technical Museum) of La Spezia and now is preserved for the public.
