= CABI Cattaneo =

Italian boat and submersible builder

- Industry: Defense
- Founded: 1936
- Founder: Giustino Cattaneo, Guido Cattaneo
- Headquarters: Milan, Italy
- Key people: Alberto Villa
- Website: www.cabicattaneo.it

CABI Cattaneo is an Italian boat and submersible builder which primarily supplies the Special Operations Forces market. Due to the nature of their work they are extremely secretive.

== History ==
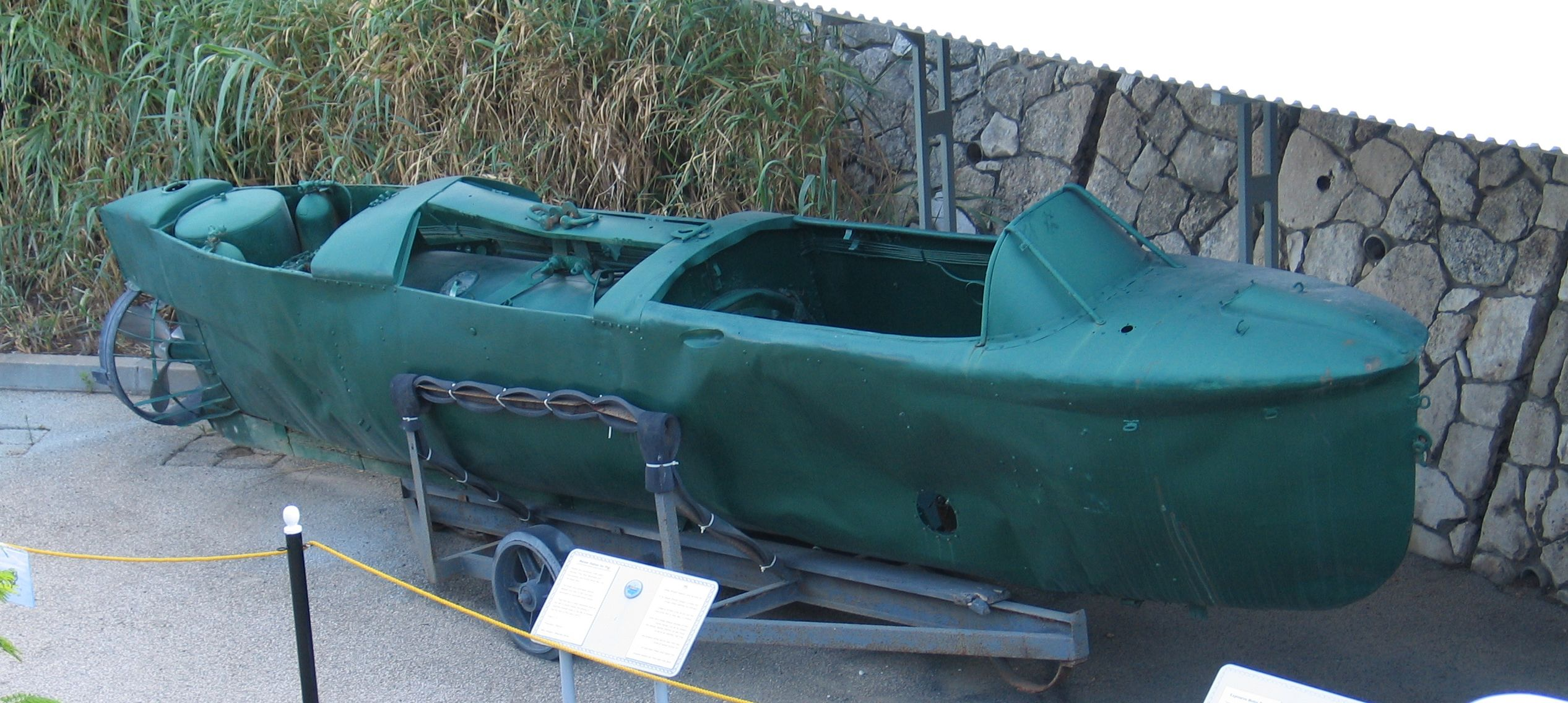
Israel Navy Gang (pig) SDV BIR-55 formerly with Shayetet 13

CABI Cattaneo was founded in 1936 by Giustino Cattaneo and was involved in vehicle design and engineering before World War II. They have primarily supplied Italy's COMSUBIN Special Forces but they have also been active in the export market, albeit in absolute secrecy. In 2016 the company participated in an expo, Seafuture 2016, for the first time. From their inception they involved in the production of components for special operations craft, in 1936 they produced the engine components for the first MT explosive motorboats.

In 2018 the company unveiled their Deep Shadow swimmer delivery vehicle. It has a crew of two and a carrying capacity of four combat divers.

They are based in Milan, Italy.

== Products ==
=== Tipo-C Chariot ===
The Tipo-C Chariot was introduced in 1954 for the Incursori.

==== Specifications ====
- Length: 6.430 m
- Hull diameter: 0.76 m
- Operating depth: 30 m
- Speed: 4.8 kn max, 2.3 kn cruising
- Endurance: 26 nmi
- Armament: limpet mines
- Crew: 2+

=== BIR-58 ===
The BIR-58 swimmer delivery vehicle was introduced in 1958. It was named for Gino Birindelli and had a gasoline engine for surface running.

==== Specifications ====
- Length: 6.45 m
- Hull width: 1.18 m
- Empty weight: 1.5 tonnes
- Operating depth: 20 m
- Speed: 4.5 kn max, 3.5 kn cruising
- Endurance: 40 nmi on batteries, 70 nmi with engine (surface)
- Armament: limpet mines
- Crew/PAX: 5

=== AE-90 ===
Revealed to the public in 2023 after its retirement.

== See also ==
- Cos.Mo.S
- Drass (company)
