= Dolgorae-class submarine =

Submarine class

- Dolgorae-class submarine

Class overview
- Builders: Korea Takoma Shipyard
- Operators: Republic of Korea Navy
- Preceded by: Cosmos class
- Succeeded by: Chang Bogo class
- In commission: 1985–2016
- Completed: 3
- Retired: 3
- Preserved: 1

General characteristics
- Type: Midget submarine
- Displacement: 175 tonnes (172 long tons) full load
- Length: 25 m (82 ft 0 in)
- Beam: 2.1 m (6 ft 11 in)
- Speed: 16 knots (30 km/h; 18 mph)
- Complement: 14
- Sensors & processing systems: STN Atlas hull-mounted sonar; Pilkington CK037 / CK041 search periscope
- Armament: 2 × 406 mm (16 in) torpedo tubes

The Dolgorae-class submarine (Hangul: 돌고래급 잠수정) was a type of midget submarine designed and acquired for the Republic of Korea Navy. All three units are now retired.

These midget submarines were the first South Korean submarines of any type. They were acquired primarily to obtain initial experience with the basics of operating a submarine force. The secondary mission to train surface ASW ships in the detection of North Korean midget submarines.

== Replacement ==
In November 2011, South Korea unveiled plans for a new mini-sub designated KSS-500A. In September 2015, Jane's.com reported that Hyundai Heavy Industries started construction of a single 40 m (130 ft) long HDS-400 mini submarine for an unnamed naval customer.

== Ships in the class ==
Name	Builder	Launched	Commissioned	Decommissioned	Status
ROKS SSM-051	Korea Takoma Shipyard	2 April 1982	1985	2003	
ROKS SSM-052	Korea Takoma Shipyard	1987?	1990	2016	Retired
ROKS SSM-053	Korea Takoma Shipyard	1988?	1991	2016	Retired; museum ship at Seoul Battleship Park

In November 2017, SSM-053 was opened as a museum ship in the Seoul Battleship Park beside the Han River in western Seoul.
