= Seoul Battleship Park =

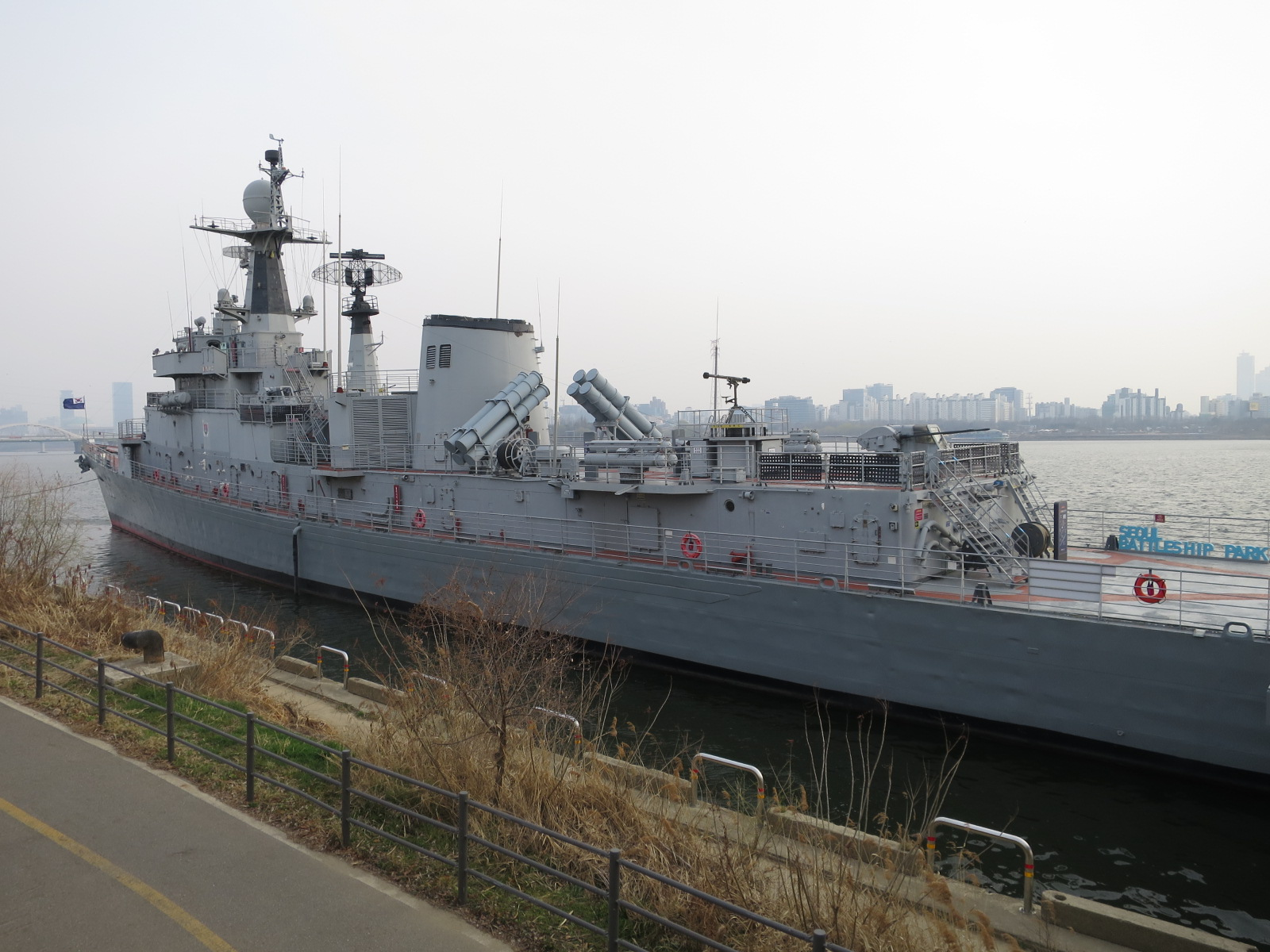
- ROKS Seoul (FF-952) at Seoul Battleship Park

- Location within South Korea
- 37.553°N 126.897°E
- Location: Mapo-gu, Seoul, South Korea

History
- Founded: 2017

Seoul Battleship Memorial Park (Korean: 서울함공원) is a military history park and museum on the Han River in Mapo-gu, Seoul, South Korea.

In 2024 the park had over five million visitors.

== Vessels on display ==
- ROKS Seoul (FF-952)
- SSM-053 Dolgorae-class submarine
- PKM-285 Chamsuri-class patrol boat
