= Midget submarine =

Submarine under 150 tons

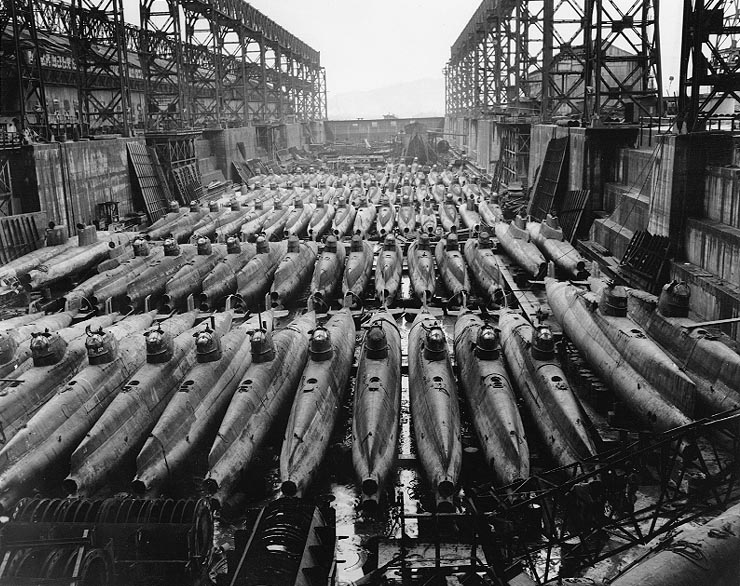
Some 80 Japanese Type D "Kōryū" Midget Submarines in a dry dock at Kure, 19 October 1945

A midget submarine is any submarine under 150 tons, typically operated by a crew of one or two but sometimes up to nine, with little or no on-board living accommodation. They normally work with mother ships, from which they are launched and recovered and which provide living accommodation for the crew and support staff.

Both military and civilian midget submarines have been built. Military types work with surface ships and other submarines as mother ships. Civilian and non-combatant military types are generally called submersibles and normally work with surface ships. Most early submarines would now be considered midget submarines, such as the United States Navy's USS Holland (SS-1) and the British Royal Navy's HMS Holland 1 (both named for the same designer).

== Military submarines ==
=== Uses ===
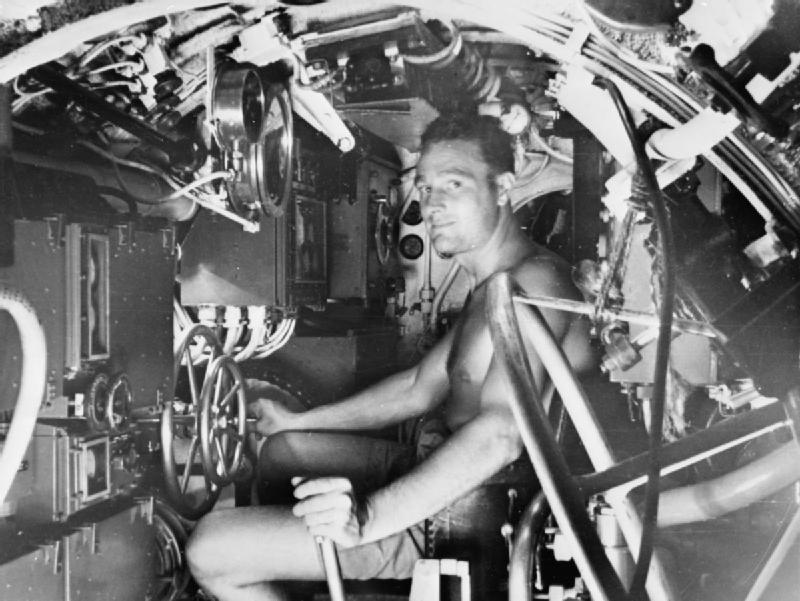
Crew of a British X-class midget submarine, part of the British Pacific Submarine Fleet

Midget submarines are best known for harbor penetration, although only two World War II boats, the British X-craft and the unsuccessful Welman submarine, were specifically designed with this in mind. Japan's Ko-hyoteki-class submarines were originally designed to take part in decisive fleet actions. However, as circumstances changed, they were given the task of harbor penetration. Germany's various World War II designs were mostly designed to attack Allied shipping off landing beaches and harbors, although the Seehund had a great enough range to attack shipping off the Thames estuary.

Midget submarines have also seen some use in support roles. X-craft were used for reconnaissance, and the Seehund was used to carry supplies. A number of modern midget submarines have also been built for submarine rescue.

=== Armament ===
Midget submarines are commonly armed with torpedoes and mines in the form of, for example, detachable side loads and nose sections. Alternatively they may function as swimmer delivery vehicles to deliver frogmen to the vicinity of their targets, which are then attacked with limpet mines.

== Civilian ==
In civilian use, midget submarines are generally called submersibles; commercial submersibles are used in, for example, underwater maintenance, exploration, archaeology, and scientific research. Other commercially available submersibles are marketed as novelty tourist attractions and as specialised tenders for wealthy yacht owners. Also, a growing number of amateur submariners homebuilt submersibles as a hobby.

== Types by nation ==
=== Belgium ===
- FNRS-2 pioneering research submersible

=== Colombia ===
- S.X.506 a 70-ton 5-man crew midget submarine designed by Italian shipbuilder Cosmos as a development of earlier S.X.404 by the same firm. Displacement is 58/70 t (surfaced/submerged), length is 23 m, beam is 2 m, draft is 4 m, and speed is 8.5/7 kn (surfaced/submerged). At a speed of 7 kn, range is 1200/60 nmi (surfaced/submerged). Payload includes externally attached torpedoes and swimmer delivery vehicles, and up to 8 divers can be carried in addition to the 5-man crew.

=== USSR and Finland ===
- MIR for research and submarine rescue

=== France ===
- FNRS-3 research submersible
- Archimède research submersible
- FNRS-4 second generation research submersible
- Nautile research submersible to depth of 6 kilometers
- SP-350 Denise diving saucer

France also acquired a number of German midget submarines at the end of WW2.

=== Germany ===
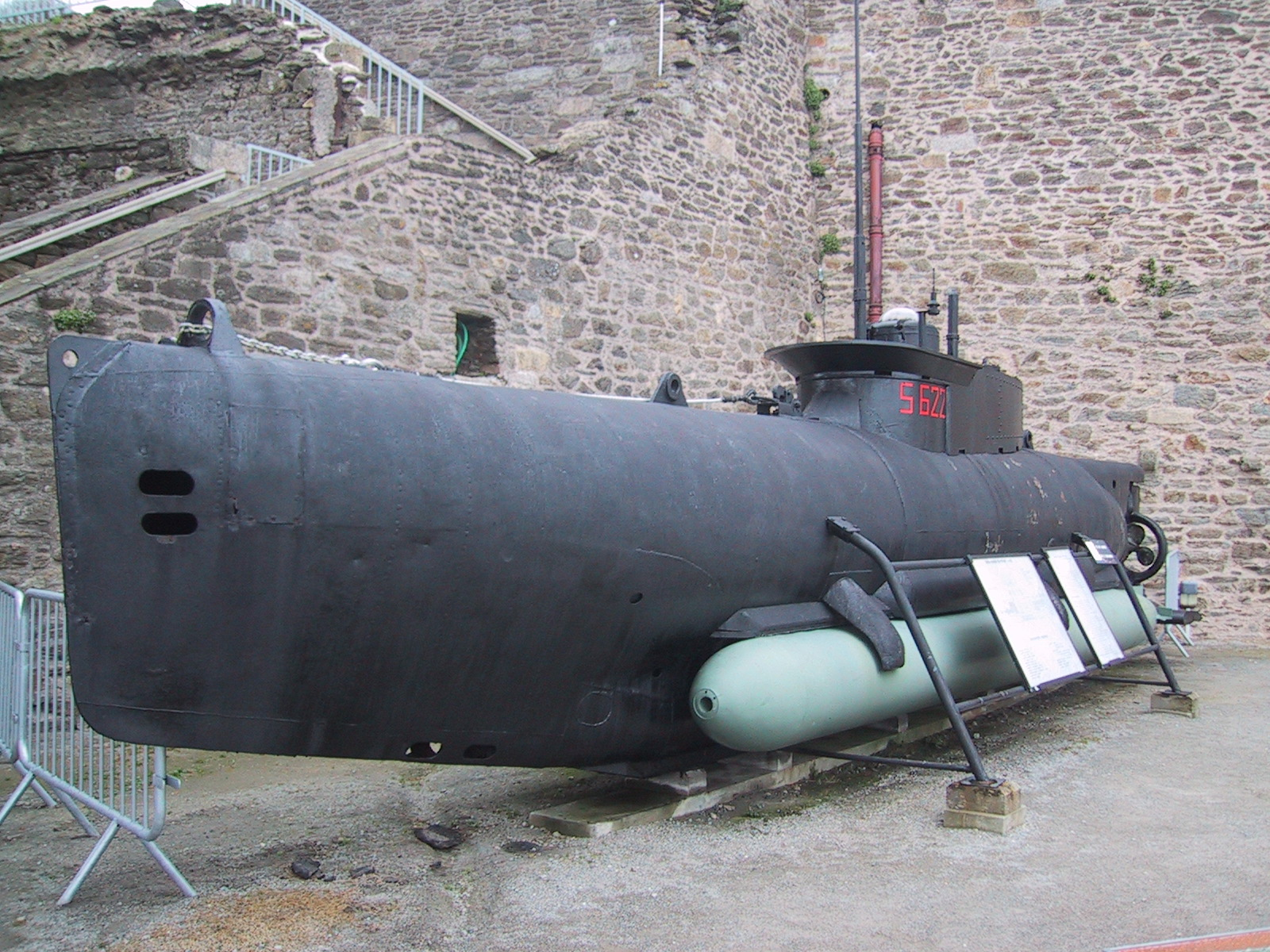
German midget submarine Seehund, with a torpedo

Most German midget submarines were developed late in World War II in an attempt to stop the Allied liberation of Europe and used later to disrupt its supply lines. As a result, the submarines mostly engaged in open water attacks rather than harbour penetration.

- Biber (324 built by AG Weser of Bremen)
- Delphin (2 built) 2-man 5-ton torpedo with top speed of 20 knots (37 km/h) and submerged radius of 30 nautical miles (56 km) at 3 knots (5.6 km/h).
- Hai (midget submarine) prototype of improved Marder.
- Hecht type XXVIIA 2-man 12 ton submarine with 1 mine or 1 torpedo carried outboard to a range of 38 miles at 4 knots.
- Marder (~300 built) similar to Neger with breathing apparatus to allow submerged operation.
- Molch Completely electric motor driven WWII (1944–1945) Midget submarine. Total 393 built.
- Schwertwal (Grampus) Designed as super-fast Walter-type midget boat, but the prototype was not complete when scuttled in May 1945.
- Neger (~200 built) 1-man 5-ton torpedo with underslung G7E torpedo. Top speed 20 knots and range of 30 miles at 3 knots.
- Seehund type XXVIIB Most successful midget submarine in the Kriegsmarine. Operational deployment was between January 1945 – April 1945.
- V.80 4-man 76-ton prototype completed in 1940 to test Walther geared turbine propulsion system. Range was 50 nautical miles (93 km) at 28 knots (52 km/h).
- Orca class post-war midget submarine: 13.27 meter x 2.1 meter 5 men midget submarine with maximum depth of 100, maximum underwater speed of 5 kn, maximum range of 150 nmi, maximum endurance of 4 days, and maximum payload of 250 kg. Periscopes includes television camera, HF/HF communication and GPS antenna. There is also an underwater television camera and obstacle avoidance sonar with an effective range of 200 m. The low acoustic and magnetic signature midget sub displaces 28 t, powered by two computerized permanent magnetic electric motors that drive a single shaft low-cavitation and low noise propeller, which is controlled by fly-by-wire control system that is usually adopted for aircraft. The pressure hull is a modular design consisted of four modules that enables easy transportation and maintenance.

=== India ===
The Indian Navy is planning to acquire two midget submarines at an estimated cost of ₹2000 Crores for use as swimmer delivery vehicles. These submarines will be used for conducting underwater special operations by MARCOS. Both submarines will be constructed by Hindustan Shipyard Limited.

=== Indonesia ===
The Indonesian Navy has shown some interest in having a new Midget-class submarine, built by local shipyards, for coastal rather than open water patrol. The submarine was designed a number of years ago by a retired Indonesian Navy submariner officer, Colonel (Ret) Ir. R. Dradjat Budiyanto, Msc. The midget experiment project involves the construction of a submarine, designated MIDGET IM X −1, which will weigh about 150 – 250 tonnes, with a tubular frame design 24 – 30 meters long, and four torpedo tubes. The submarines will have minimum of 8 – 10 crew members including officers. They will have a 40 km range non-hull-penetrating optronic mast as the attack periscope, and a 20 km range navigation periscope.

Indonesian defence minister Purnomo Yusgiantoro has backed the project. Construction should commence at the Indonesian PT.PAL INDONESIA shipyard by late 2011, and will take about three or four years to complete.

=== Iran ===
- Ghadir
- Nahang
- Khomaini

=== Italy ===
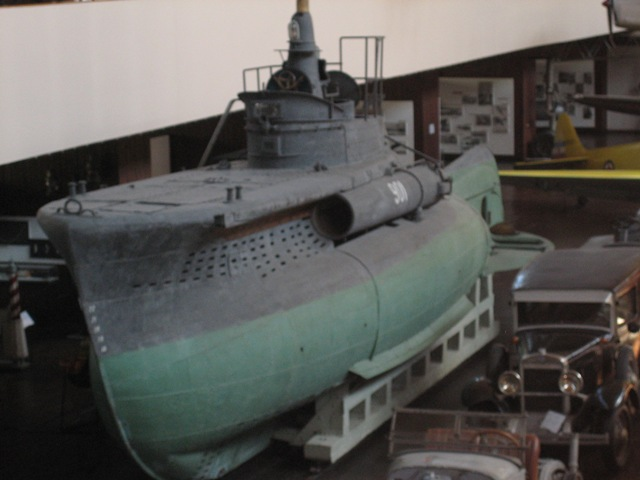
An Italian CB-class submarine in the Nikola Tesla Technical Museum in Zagreb, Croatia

- Siluro a Lenta Corsa (SLC), also known as Maiale (pig), a low speed human torpedo. On 3 December 1941, Sciré departed La Spezia carrying three Maiale to conduct what became the Raid on Alexandria (1941). At the island of Leros in the Aegean Sea, six Decima Flottiglia MAS crewmen came aboard, including Lieutenant Luigi Durand de la Penne. On December 18 Sciré released the manned torpedoes 1.3 miles from Alexandria commercial harbor, and they entered the harbor when the British opened the boom defence to let three of their destroyers pass. After many difficulties, de la Penne and his crewmate Emilio Bianchi successfully attached a limpet mine under HMS Valiant, but had to surface as they attempted to leave and were captured. They refused to answer when questioned and were detained in a compartment aboard Valiant. Fifteen minutes before the explosion, de la Penne asked to speak to the Valiant's captain and informed him of the imminent explosion but refused to give other information. He was returned to the compartment and neither he or Bianchi were injured by the detonation of the mine. The other four torpedo-riders were also captured, but their mines sank Valiant, the battleship Queen Elizabeth, the Norwegian tanker Sagona and badly damaged the destroyer HMS Jervis. The two battleships sank in only a few feet of water and were subsequently re-floated. Nevertheless, they were out of action for over a year.
- Bathyscaphe Trieste was first to explore the Challenger Deep of the Mariana Trench
- CA type First series was a 2-man midget submarine the second series carried a crew of three.
- CB type 45 ton 4 man design first introduced in 1941
- CE2F/X100 post-war torpedo chariot
- MG 120: MG 120 Shallow water attack submarine (SWATS) is a development of MG 110 in Pakistani service with the displacement is increased to 130 t submerged, range is 1600 nmi @ 7 kn surfaced, 60 nmi @ 4.5 kn submerged, and the number of divers carried is drastically increased to 15.
- MG 130: MG 130 is a development of MG 120 with AIP module called UAPE (Underwater Auxiliary Propulsion Engine) based on a closed circuit diesel fueled by liquid oxygen, which provides an underwater range of 400 nmi (740 km).

=== Japan ===
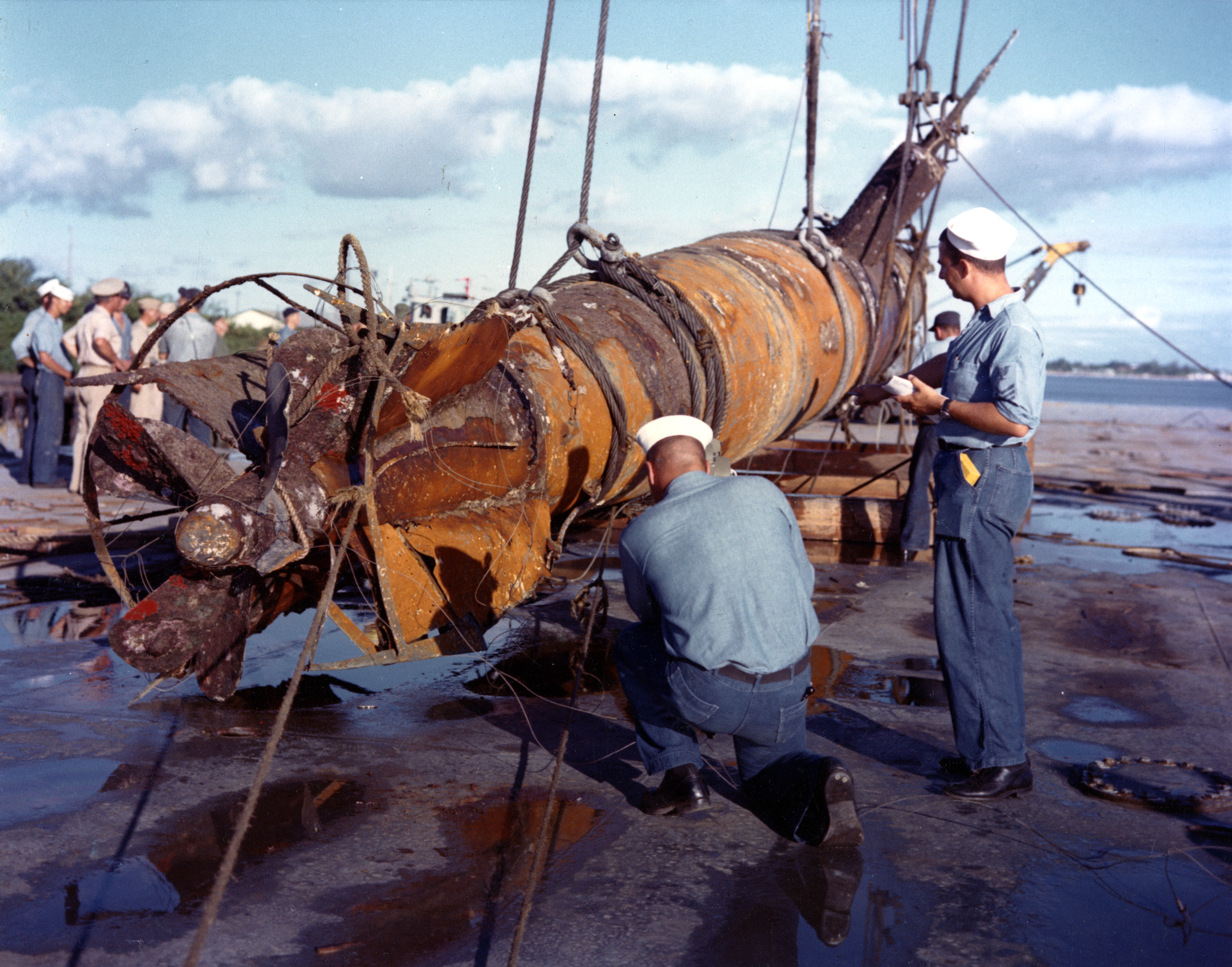
Japanese Type A Midget Submarine recovered in 1960 off Pearl Harbor, Hawaii

- Type A Kō-hyōteki-class midget submarines were used in the 1941 attack on Pearl Harbor, the 1942 attack on Sydney Harbour, and the 1942 Allied attack on Diego Suarez Harbor, in which the type 97 torpedo was used operationally. The wreckage of one of the submarines sunk at Pearl Harbor was located by NOAA's Hawaii Undersea Research Laboratory (HURL) in August 2002. Photographic analysis conducted by the United States Naval Institute in 1999 indicated that one of the five Ko-hyoteki-class submarines managed to enter Pearl Harbor, and successfully fired a torpedo into USS West Virginia. On 29 May 1942, one of two midget submarines managed to enter the Diego Suarez harbor and fire two torpedoes. One torpedo seriously damaged the battleship HMS Ramillies, while the second sank the oil tanker British Loyalty (6,993 tons).

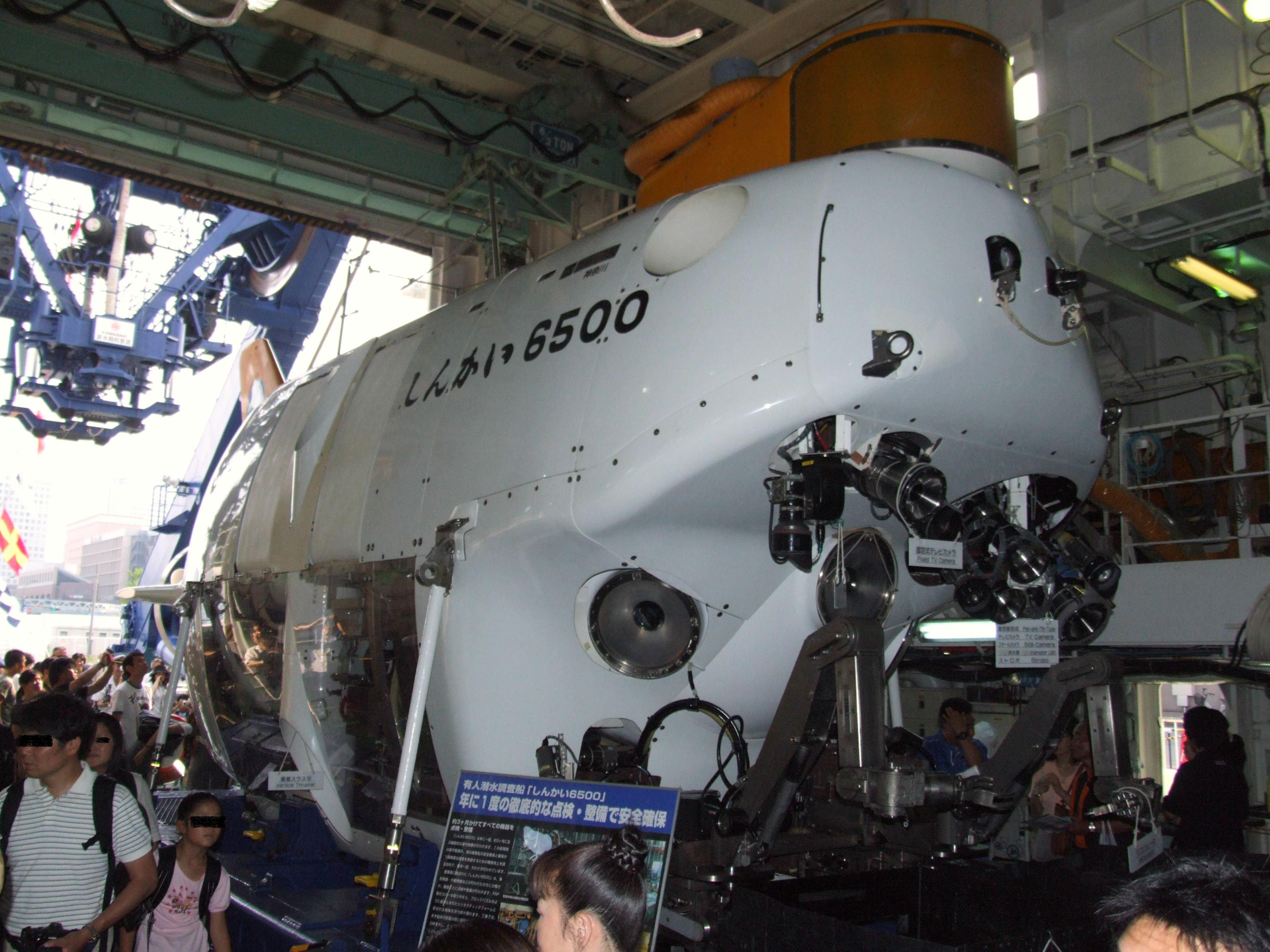
DSV Shinkai

- Type B Kō-hyōteki-class Midget Ha 45 prototype built 1942 to test Type A improvements.
- Type C Kō-hyōteki-class Midget Ha 62–76 similar to Type A with crew of 3 and range increased to 350 nautical miles (650 km) at 6 knots (11 km/h) surfaced or 120 nautical miles (220 km) at 4 knots (7.4 km/h) submerged.
- Type D Kō-hyōteki-class, also called Kōryū class (115 completed) improved Type C with crew of 5 and range increased to 1,000 miles (1,600 km) at 8 knots (15 km/h) surfaced and 320 miles (510 km) at 16 knots (30 km/h) submerged.
- Kairyū-class submarine
- Kaiten submarine suicide torpedo.
- DSV Shinkai research submersible, capable of diving to a depth of 6.5 kilometres (4.0 miles)

=== North Korea ===
- Yugo-class submarine
- Yono-class submarine (see also ROKS Cheonan sinking)

=== South Korea ===
- S.X.756: Developed by Italian shipbuilder Cosmos as a successor of earlier S.X.506 midget submarine in Colombian service. Length is increased to 25.2 m and beam is increased to 2.1 m in comparison to its predecessor S.X.506, and displacement is increased to 73/80 t (surfaced/submerged). Crew is increased by one to a total of 6, but the total number of divers carried remained the same at 8. Range is 1600 nmi @ 6 kn surfaced, and 60 nmi @ 4 kn submerged, and payload remains the same.
- Dolgorae class midget sub

=== Pakistan ===
- MG 110: Developed by Italian shipbuilder Cosmos as a successor of earlier S.X.756 midget submarine in South Korean service. MG 110 is a slightly enlarged version of S.X.756 with length increased to 27.28 m, diameter increased to 2.3 m, and displacement increased to 102/110 t (surfaced/submerged). Range is 1200 nmi surfaced, and the submerged range remain the same. Payload and crew are also identical to that of its predecessor S.X.756 midget submarine.

=== China ===
- Type 7103 DSRVs
- Osprey class submersibles
- Sea Pole class bathyscaphe
- Dragon class bathyscaphe
- Harmony class bathyscaphe
- Mobile diving bell
- QSZ-II submersible

=== Poland ===
- Blotniak

=== Taiwan ===
- 2 Italian Cos.Mo.S CE2F/X100 post-war torpedo chariots
- 2 Italian Cos.Mo.S S.X.404 midget submarines: S-1 Haijiao (海蛟), S-2 Hailong (海龍), in service from October 8, 1969, to November 1, 1973. S.X.404 is a 70-ton 4-man crew submarine design by Cosmos. Four were sold to Colombia and two to Taiwan in the 1970s. Displaced is 40/70 t (surfaced/submerged), speed is 11/6.5 kn (surfaced/submerged), range is 1200/60 nmi (surfaced/submerged) @ respective maximum speed. Payload included externally attached torpedoes or mines, or swimmer delivery vehicles.

=== Romania ===
- CB class, during World War II, Romania owned five midget submarines.

=== Russia ===
- In the late 19th century Russia built a class of treadle powered submarines 4.5 meters in length designed by Stefan Drzewiecki they were withdrawn from service in 1886.
- APL and Pygmy projects – two boats were constructed in 1935-1936, tested, but later abandoned
- Losos class submarine

=== Spain ===
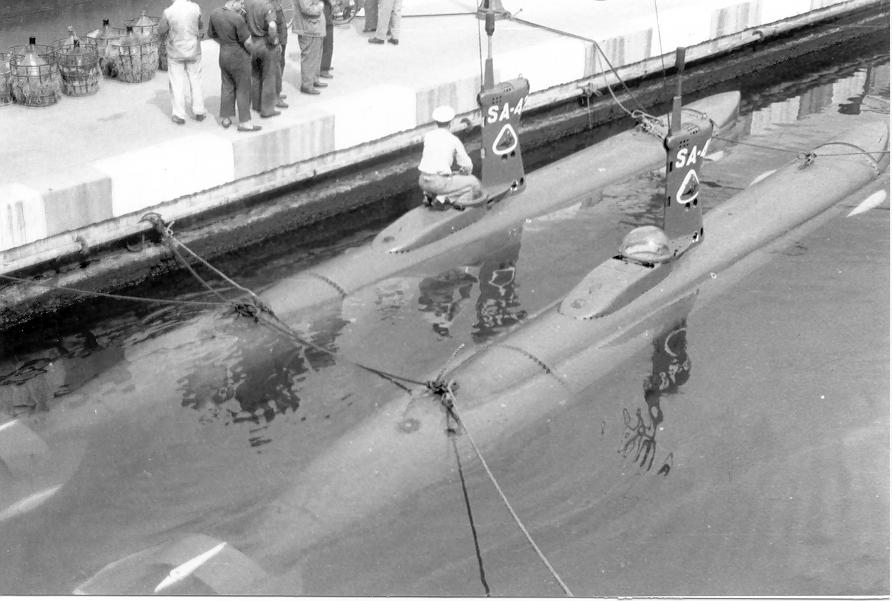
Foca I (SA-41) and Foca II (SA-42) at Cartagena

- Foca class submarine (design begun in 1957, entering service in 1962): A total of 2 units built, SA 41 & SA 42. Displacement is 16/20 t (surfaced/submerged), with a crew of 3, and armed with two 21 in torpedo tubes. Stricken in 1971. Not to be confused with World War II era Italian Foca-class submarine.
- Tiburón class submarine (design begun in 1958, entering service in 1964): A total of 2 units built, SA 51 & SA 52. Displacement is 78/81 t (surfaced/submerged), with a crew of 5, and armed with two 21 in torpedo tubes. Stricken in 1971.

=== Sweden ===
- Spiggen II class: midget submarine: 6 man crew midget sub displaces 14 t when submerged, with 5 kn speed and endurance of 2 weeks. Length: 11 m, beam: 1.4 m, height: 1.7 m.
- Sea Dagger: midget submarine developed by Kockums: a midget submarine of modular design with length of 16 – 20 m depending on various configurations totaling 4, including training, reconnaissance, diver delivery and small attack versions. All versions are consisted of 3 modules, two of which are identical for all versions, the bow and stern modules. The midsection has 4 modules to choose from, each for a specific mission. All versions lack the sail.
- UVS-1300 Malen: Originally built for navy purposes as sonar target. Midget submarine: 4 man crew midget sub displaces 11 t when submerged, with 5 kn speed and endurance of at least 1 week depending on fuel carried. Length: 10 m, beam: 1.4 m, height: 1.7 m.

=== Turkey ===
The Turkish navy has evaluated two midget submarine designs from German firm ThyssenKrupp Marine Systems, Type 200 and Type 300 classes:

- Type 200: Displacement: 200 t surfaced, length: 25 m, beam: 4.2 m, draft 3.1 m, speed: 8 kn surfaced, range: 2100 nmi @ 8 kn surfaced, endurance: 2 weeks, armament: 2 21-in torpedo tubes with a maximum of 4 torpedoes, crew: 6 + 12 divers.
- Type 300: Displacement: 300 t surfaced, length: 30 m, beam: 4.2 m, draft 3.1 m, speed: 12 kn surfaced, range: 3100 nmi @ 8 kn surfaced, endurance: 2 weeks, armament: 2 21-in torpedo tubes with a maximum of 6 torpedoes, crew: 12.

=== United Kingdom ===
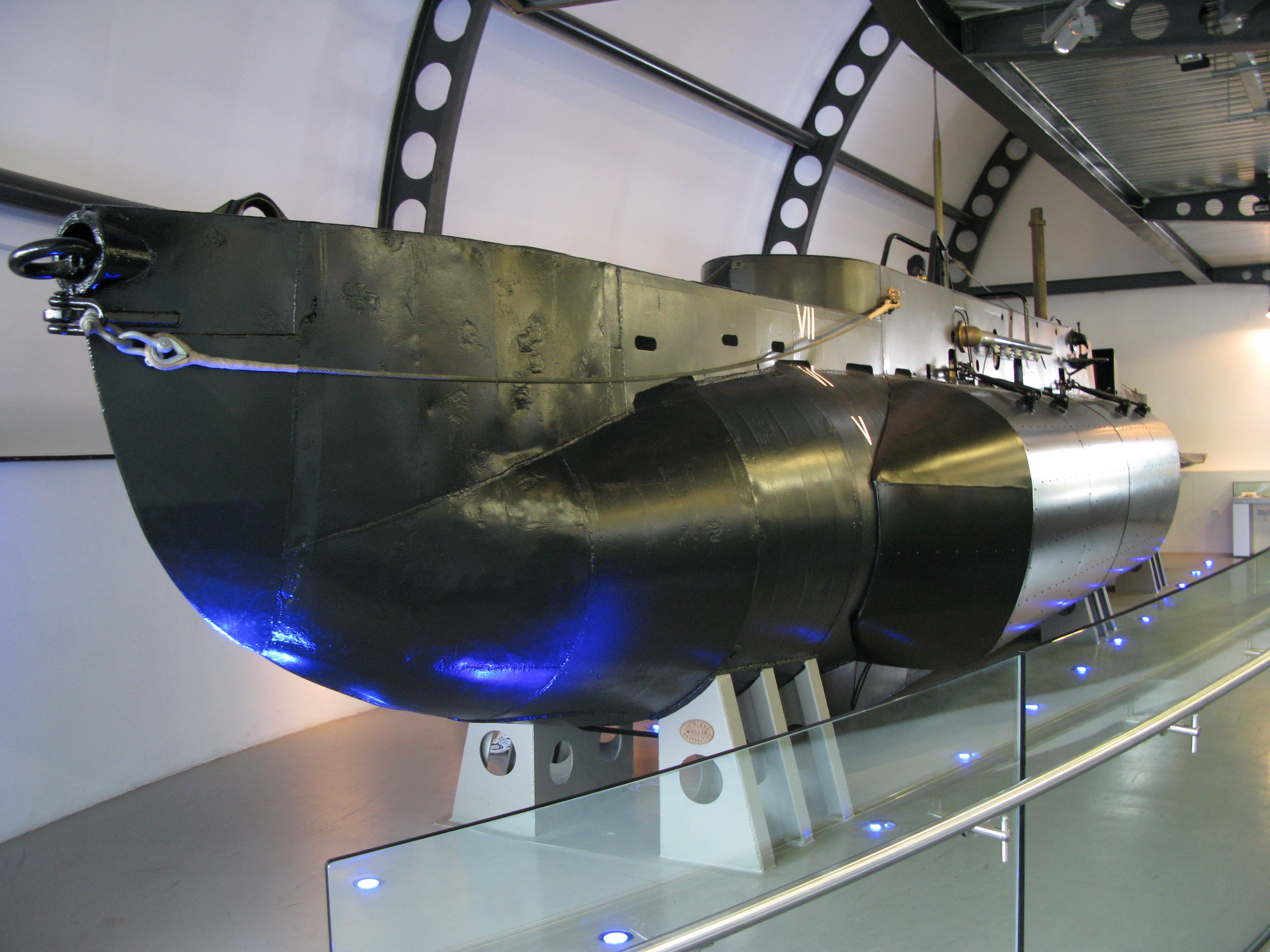
X24 a British X class submarine on display at the Royal Navy Submarine Museum

The Royal Navy has used a number of midget submarines. Most were developed during the Second World War. The decommissioning of the Stickleback class 1958–early 1960s marked the end of midget submarines designed for combat in the Royal Navy.

- Sleeping Beauty Motorized Submersible Canoe (MSC): developed by Special Operations Executive Station IX during the Second World War.
- Chariot manned torpedo: the British developed two types of manned torpedoes; the Chariot Mark I, of 1.6 ton, and the Chariot Mark II, of 2.3 ton. Sixty-four units were built.
- Stickleback class: a post Second World War development of the XE class.
- X class: used to attack German warships in the north of Norway. One notable target of a successful attack was the battleship Tirpitz. The submarines had a crew of three (plus a diver) and carried two large mines containing Amatol – one on each side. Their strategy was to lay mines on the sea bottom beneath the target, set a time fuse, and leave.
- XE class: used in the Far East against Japan, where they carried out a number of attacks and special missions.
- Welman submarine: a single-person submersible widely considered a failure.
- Welfreighter: a Station IX-developed special operations submersible with two crew and up to four passengers, designed to resemble a motorboat when surfaced. Over 100 were produced, beginning in September 1944; the extent of operational use is unclear.

=== United States ===
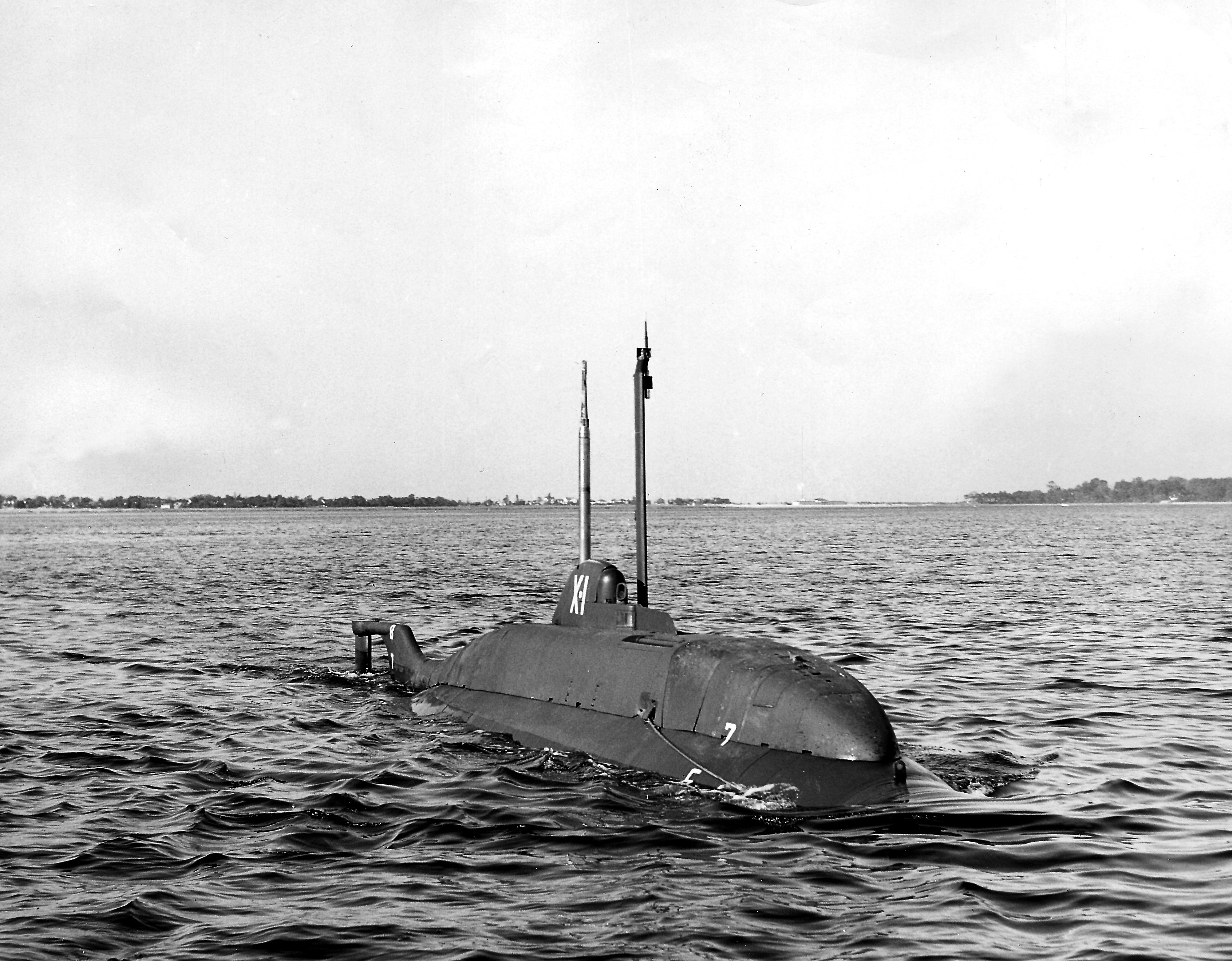
The US X-1 at sea

- Advanced SEAL Delivery System: canceled in 2009 due to cost overruns and reliability issues, and the only sub was destroyed in a fire in 2008.
- Aluminaut: the first aluminium submarine, used to recover sunken items, including DSV Alvin and an unarmed nuclear bomb.
- Bathyscaphe Trieste II (DSV-1): a sister ship to the Swiss-built Bathyscaphe Trieste
- DSV Alvin (DSV-2): performed thousands of dives, including one that explored the wreck of the RMS Titanic.
- Code name: GIMIK("Gizmo #1" and "Gizmo #2") Office of Strategic Services Project HEU covert infiltration semi-submersibles for Operation NAPKO during WWII.
- Code name: SKIFF: (#1 and #2): Central Intelligence Agency craft nearly identical in design to GIMIK.
- Nemo (DSV-5): an acronym for Naval Experimental Manned Observatory, a test vehicle operated by the Navy from 1970 to 1986. Nemo was a spherical submersible with a transparent acrylic hull, and its primary purpose was to evaluate the utility of the panoramic vision enabled by its design. Nemo was found to be an effective observation platform, despite not being able to hover in place, and acrylic-hulled submersibles have continued to be built and operated in the US.
- DSRV-1 Mystic: a Deep Submergence Rescue Vehicle formerly operated by the US Navy. Mystic was replaced by the Submarine Rescue Diving Recompression System (SRDRS) in 2008 and donated to the Naval Undersea Museum.
- Dry Combat Submersible (DCS): a US Navy submarine under development by Lockheed Martin for transporting Navy SEALs to and from a mission site. It is the planned replacement for the cancelled Advanced SEAL Delivery System.
- USS X-1: an experimental US Navy midget submarine of the 1950s, used to explore how to defend harbors against attacks by very small submarines.

=== Former Yugoslavia ===
- Una-class: After the Yugoslav Wars, both Croatia and FR Yugoslavia held examples. Length: 18 m, beam: 3.7 m, diameter: 2.5 m, displacement: 76 t surfaced, 90 t submerged, crew: 4 + 6 divers. Surfaced and submerged speed was 4 kn for both, and the range was 200 nmi surfaced, 50 nmi submerged both @ 4 kn. M-100 lacks sail and its battery could only be charged when surfaced. Up to 4 R-1 swimmer delivery vehicle (SDV)s or two light (400 mm) torpedoes could be carried.
- Type M-100D: Development of Type M-100 Una class. Displacement was increased to around 88/100 t (surfaced/submerged), and the length was increased to approximately 21 m, beam is increased to 4.42 m, and diameter to 2.7 m. Speed was increased to 8/11 kn (surfaced/submerged), and range was increased to 550 nmi surfaced @ 10 kn when surfaced, and that of submerged remained the same as its predecessor M-100 Una class while the payload and crew also remained unchanged. A sail was added, and its battery could be charged while submerged.

== See also ==
- Coastal submarine
- Bathyscaphe
- Narco-submarine
- Royal Navy Submarine Museum
- Wet sub
