= ROKS Seoul (FF-952) =

Ulsan-class frigate

Coordinates: 37.5527451°N 126.8974120°E

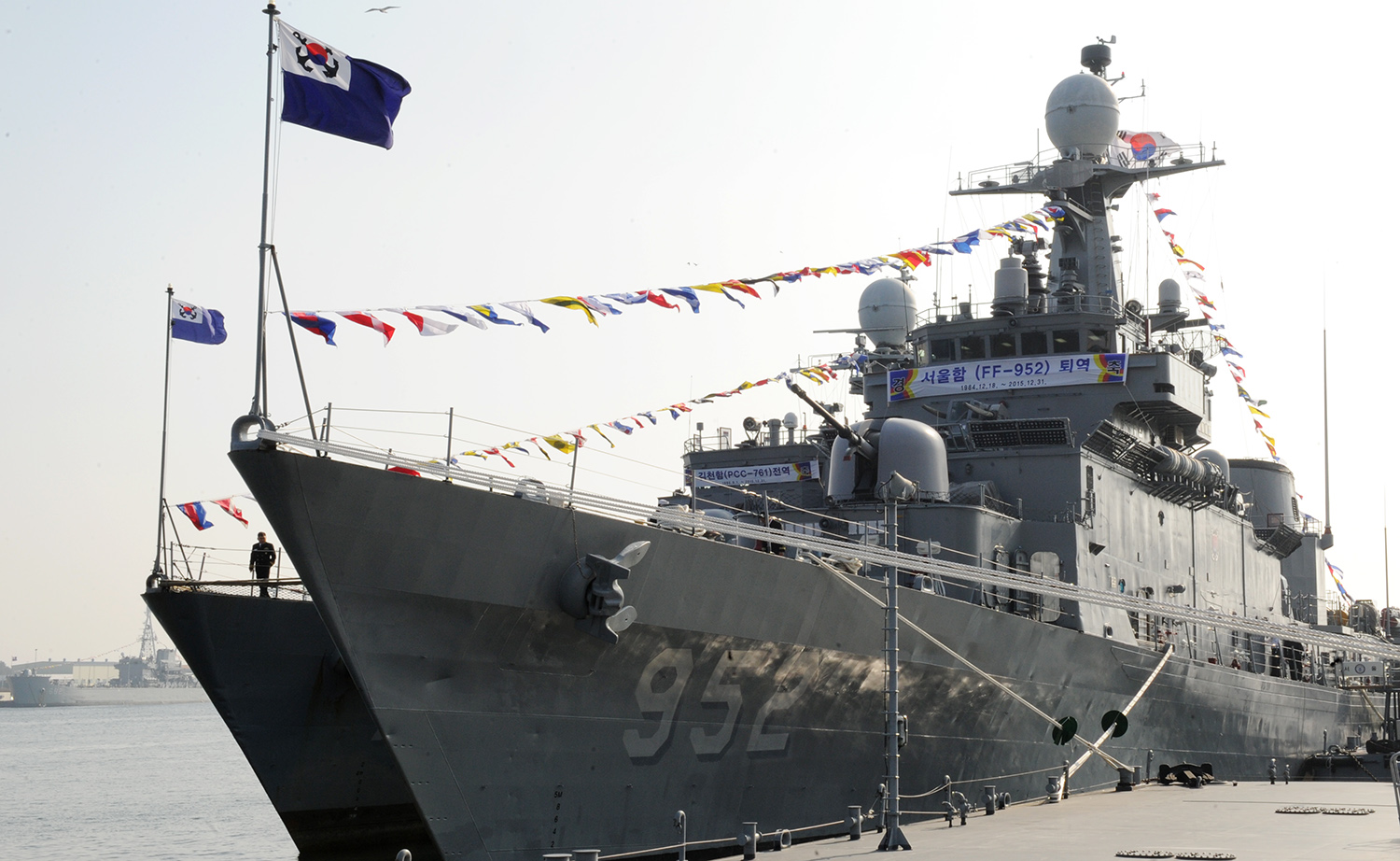
- ROKS Seoul's decommissioning ceremony on 31 December 2015

History

South Korea
- Name: Seoul; (서울)
- Namesake: Seoul
- Builder: Hyundai
- Launched: 24 April 1984
- Commissioned: 14 December 1985
- Decommissioned: 31 December 2015
- Identification: Callsign: HLGD; Hull number: FF-952
- Status: Museum ship at Seoul Battleship Park

General characteristics
- Class & type: Ulsan-class frigate
- Displacement: 1,500 tonnes (1,476 long tons) light; 2,215 tonnes (2,180 long tons) full load
- Length: 103.7 m (340 ft 3 in)
- Beam: 12.5 m (41 ft 0 in)
- Draught: 3.8 m (12 ft 6 in)
- Propulsion: CODOG; 2 x General Electric LM-2500; 2 x MTU 12V 956 TB82
- Speed: 34 knots (63 km/h; 39 mph)
- Range: 8,000 nmi (15,000 km; 9,200 mi) at 16 knots (30 km/h; 18 mph)
- Complement: 186 (16 officers)
- Sensors & processing systems: Signaal DA-08 air surveillance radar; AN/SPS-10C navigation radar; ST-1802 fire control radar; Signaal PHS-32 hull-mounted sonar; TB-261K towed sonar
- Electronic warfare & decoys: ULQ-11K ESM/ECM suite; 2 x Mark 36 SRBOC 6-tubed chaff/flare launcher; 2 x 15-tube SLQ-261 torpedo acoustic countermeasures
- Armament: 2 × Otobreda 76 mm (3 in)/62 cal. gun; 4 × Emerson EMERLEC 30 twin-barrel turret for two Oerlikon 30mm L/75 KCB cannons; 2 × Mk.32 SVTT 324 mm (12.8 in) triple-tube torpedo launchers for Chung Sang Eo torpedoes; 8 × Harpoon Block 1C (2 quadruple launchers) anti-ship cruise missiles

ROKS Seoul (FF-952) is the second ship of the Ulsan-class frigate in the Republic of Korea Navy. She is named after the city, Seoul.

== Development ==
In the early 1990s, the Korean government plan for the construction of next generation coastal ships named Frigate 2000 was scrapped due to the 1997 Asian financial crisis. But the decommissioning of the Gearing-class destroyers and the aging fleet of Ulsan-class frigates, the plan was revived as the Future Frigate eXperimental, also known as FFX in the early 2000s.

10 ships were launched and commissioned from 1980 to 1993. They have 3 different variants which consists of Flight I, Flight II and Flight III.

== Construction and career ==
ROKS Seoul was launched on 24 April 1984 by Hyundai Heavy Industries and commissioned on 14 December 1985.

She was decommissioned on 31 December 2015 and moored at Seoul Battleship Park, in her namesake city as a museum ship.
