= Cabrini-class patrol boat =

Multipurpose patrol boat class

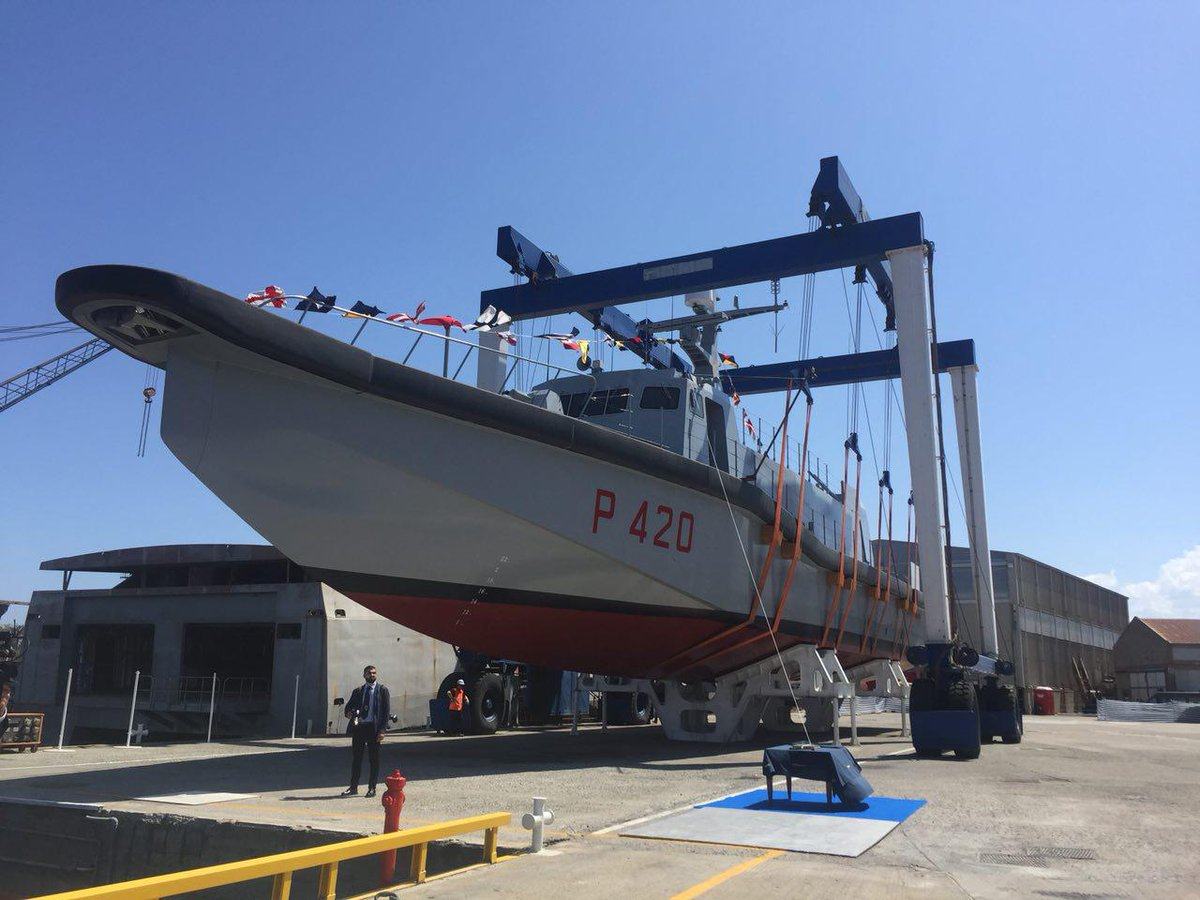

Class overview
- Name: Cabrini class
- Builders: Intermarine/Rodriguez, (Messina)
- Operators: Italian Navy
- Cost: €42 million for 2 units; €21 million per unit
- Built: 2016–2019
- In commission: 2019–present
- Planned: 2
- Active: 2

General characteristics
- Type: Patrol boat
- Displacement: 190 t (190 long tons) full load
- Length: 44.16 m (144 ft 11 in) LOA; 36.25 m (118 ft 11 in) LPP
- Beam: 9.2 m (30 ft 2 in) LOA; 8.4 m (27 ft 7 in) LPP
- Propulsion: 3 × MTU 16V200 M94 diesel engines; 2.000 kW (2.682 bhp) each; 3 × Rolls-Royce Kamewa S4 waterjets; 2 × diesel engines generators 120 kW (160 bhp) each
- Speed: +32 knots (59 km/h; 37 mph)
- Range: 1,000 nmi (1,900 km; 1,200 mi) at 15 knots (28 km/h; 17 mph)
- Endurance: 10 days with 9 crew/troops; 3 days with 27 crew/troops
- Complement: 9 crew + 20 COMSUBIN troops; 27 + 2 beds
- Sensors & processing systems: Leonardo CMS SADOC Mk4; 1 × GEM Elettronica MM/SPN-760, navigation dual-band radar, X/Ku; 1 × Leonardo Janus-N IRST system; satellite communications
- Armament: 1 × Oto Melara Hitfist-N 12.7 mm, remotized; 1 × Spike LR missile launcher; 2 × 7.62 mm gatling machine gun Dillon Aero M134D; up to 12 machine guns
- Notes: stern ramp for RHIB 7.33 m (24 ft 1 in) with automatic recovery and launching system; fuel tank: 35 m^{3} (1,200 cu ft) F76; fresh water tank: 4 m^{3} (140 cu ft); ammunition depot: about 1 t (0.98 long tons); ballistic resistance: STANAG 4569 Level II

The Cabrini class is a new high-speed multipurpose patrol boat class of the Italian Navy (Marina Militare), also known as Unità Navale Polifunzionale ad Alta Velocità (UNPAV) or K-180.

The Italian shipbuilding company Intermarine has begun building two high-speed multipurpose vessels for the Italian Navy, as part of a wider fleet rebuilding programme being delivered under the Legge Navale (or 'naval law'). The two naval units are destined for the special forces of the COMSUBIN.

== Design ==
The vessels will embark special forces units from the navy and other Italian services, as well as deploying naval diving units. The vessels carry a crew of nine and can embark up to 20 additional personnel. The vessels are expected to have an endurance of 10 days with nine on board. The hull and superstructure are designed to reduce radar, infrared (IR), and acoustic signatures. It is possible to install a containerized decompression chamber to support underwater activities. Ballistic protection is also provided for operating areas on the platform. The platforms are expected to receive a scaled-down fit of the same integrated navigation and command, control, and communications (C3) suite selected for larger vessels being delivered under the Legge Navale, Leonardo SADOC Mk4.

== Ships ==
Italian Navy - UNPAV (Unità Navali Polivalenti Alta Velocità - High-speed multipurpose vessels) class
Name	Pennant number	Laid down	Launched	Commissioned	Status	Notes
Angelo Cabrini	P420	September 2016	26 May 2018	8 July 2019		
Tullio Tedeschi	P421	2017	11 May 2019	3 March 2020		
