= Cos.Mo.S =

- Industry: Defense
- Founded: 1954
- Founder: Ing. Sergio Pucciarini
- Defunct: 2003
- Headquarters: Livorno, Italy

Cos.Mo.S, officially Costruzione Motoscafi Sottomarini s.a.s, was an Italian submarine and submersible manufacturer.

== History ==
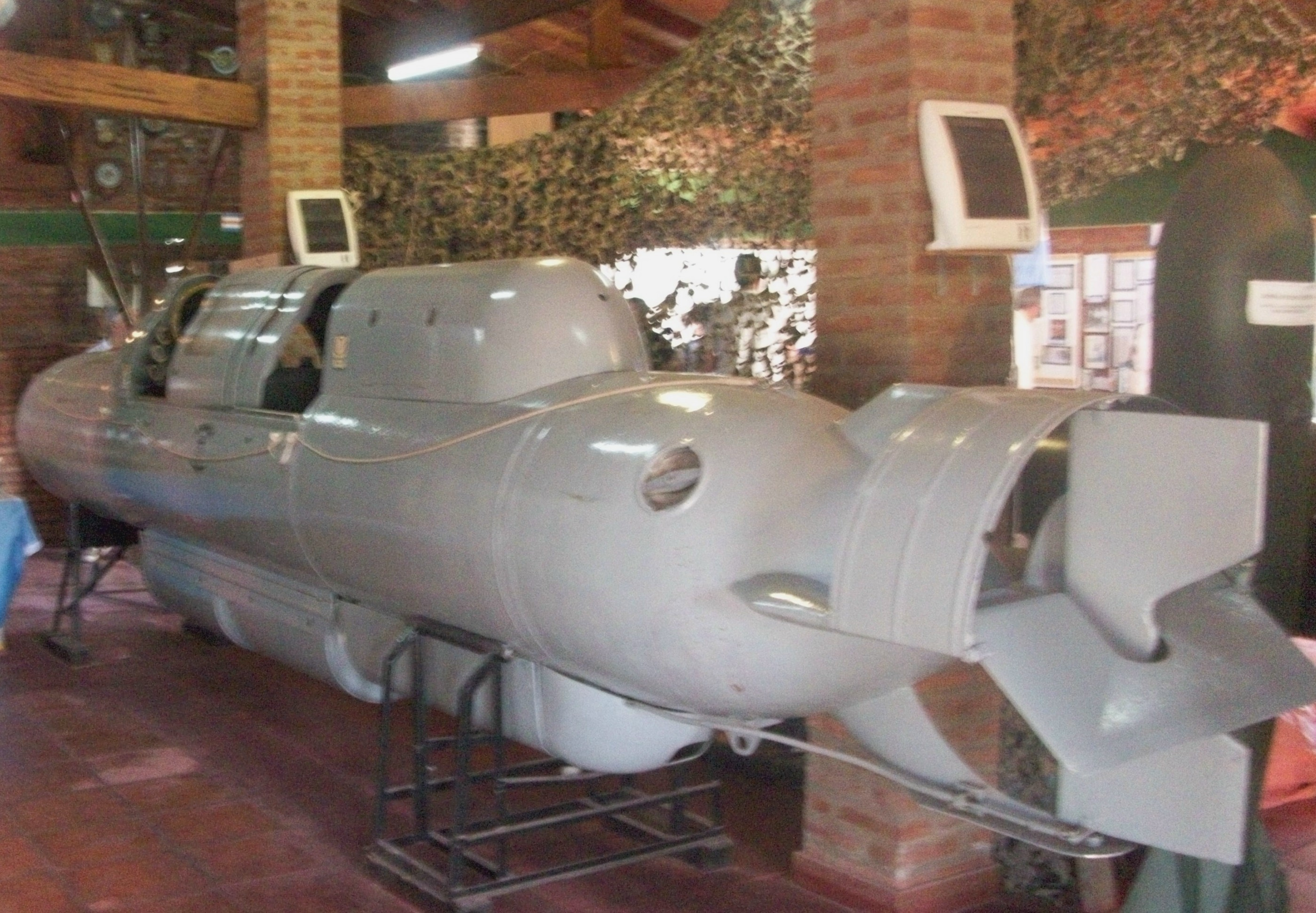
Argentine Navy's CE2F/X100-T, designed for operations in cold waters

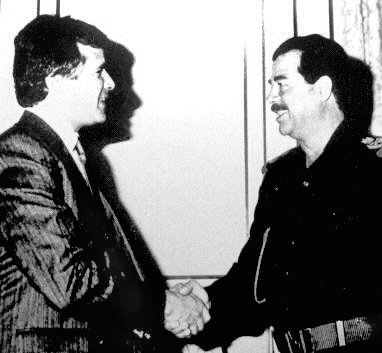
Carlos Cardoen meeting with former Iraqi President Saddam Hussein

Cos.Mo.S was started in 1954 by Sergio Pucciarini, a former Italian combat diver. Development of their initial offering, Ippocampo (Sea Horse), predates the establishment of the company and was built/tested in 1950/51. The American Underwater Demolition Teams purchased their first Sea Horses in the late 1950s and the US Navy made a formal order for Sea Horse IIs in the mid-1960s. In US service the Sea Horse and Sea Horse II are not known to have ever been used for any purpose besides training.

The Cosmos CE2F series of Swimmer Delivery Vehicles enjoyed significant export success. The follow on CE4F series was first exported to Turkey and they remain the only known customer.

In the 1950s and 1960s there was a shift to longer range special operations missions enabled by running swimmer delivery vehicles on the surface for most of the journey. In secret Cos.Mo.S began developing a submersible boat called Nessie (after the Loch Ness Monster), probably based on requirement issued by the Italian Navy. The Nessie was forty feet long and had a crew of eight. The hull was designed by Renato ‘Sonny’ Levi who based the design on an unbuilt offshore racing powerboat. His design was prototyped as the Dart-38 in the early 1970s and this prototype achieved 80 knots in tests. The design was never acquired by the Italian Navy who chose a competing design.

From 1966 to 1972, Cos.Mo.S was an important defense contractor for the Government of Pakistan and it manufactured the SX-404-class midget submarine, primarily for the Pakistan Navy.

From 1983 to 1985, the company was again awarded federal contract by Pakistani administration and designed the Cosmos-class submarine, later built by KS&EW shipyard in Karachi.

In 1989 Ing. Pucciarini sold the firm to Chilean arms dealer Carlos Cardoen. In the late 1990s Cardoen began negotiating the sale of submarines to Saddam Hussein’s regime in Iraq. The deal eventually grew into a full sale of the company to the Iraqis and the Italian government put a stop to the deal when it was revealed in the press. The cancellation of the Iraqi deal combined with the failure of a number of other deals drove the company to insolvency. An international arrest warrant was issued for Carlos Cardoen for his part in the Iraqi scandal but he was never brought to justice. After their demise their physical and intellectual property was transferred to a number of competitors and startups including DRASS.

None of their products are known to have ever entered into service with the Italian armed forces.

== See also ==
- CABI Cattaneo
