= Cosmos CE2F series =

Italian swimmer delivery vehicles

CosMoS CE2F were a series of swimmer delivery vehicles (SDV) built by M/s Cos.Mo.S Spa. which was based in Livorno, Italy.

== Design ==
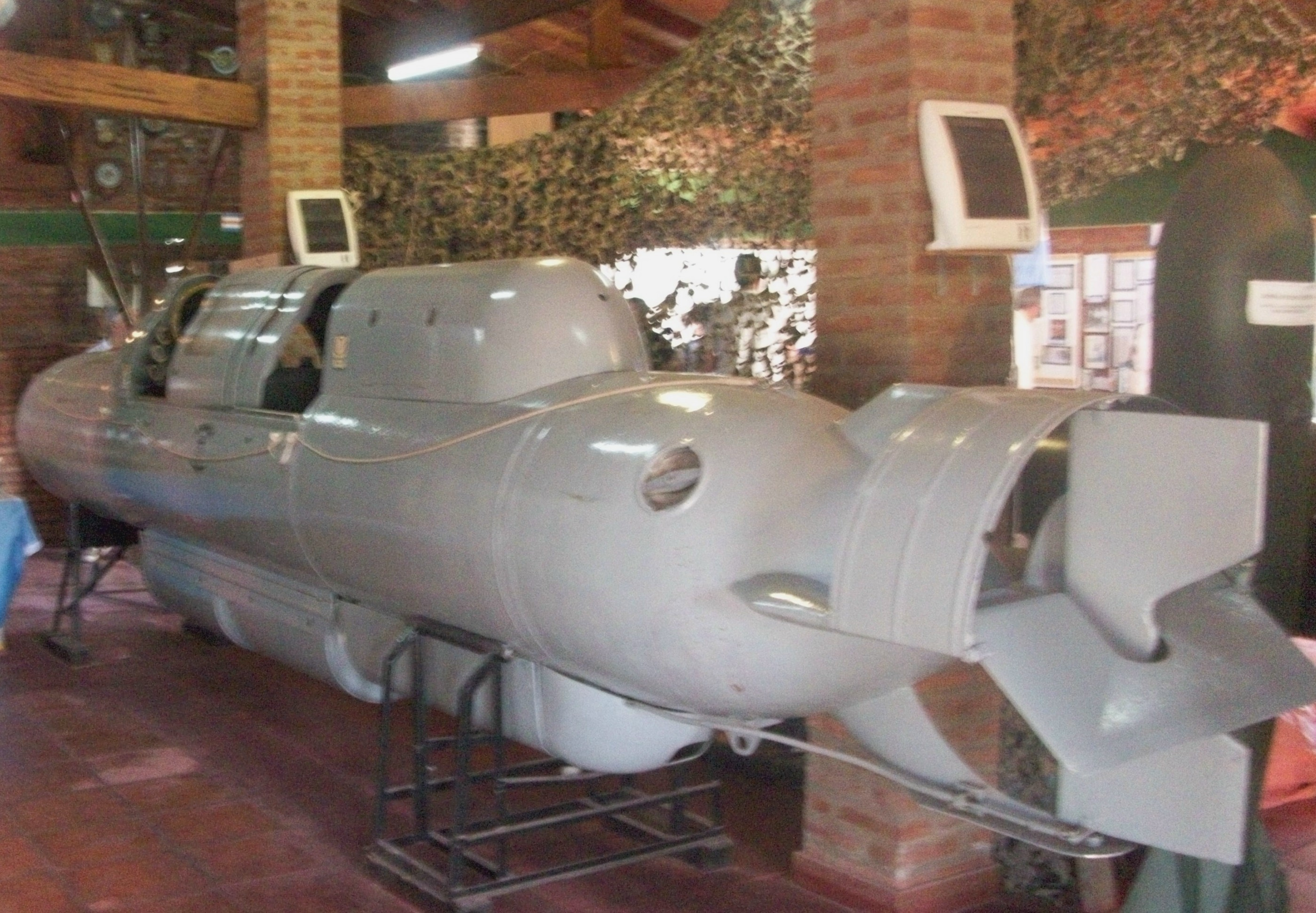
Argentine Navy's CE2F/X100-T, designed for operations in cold waters

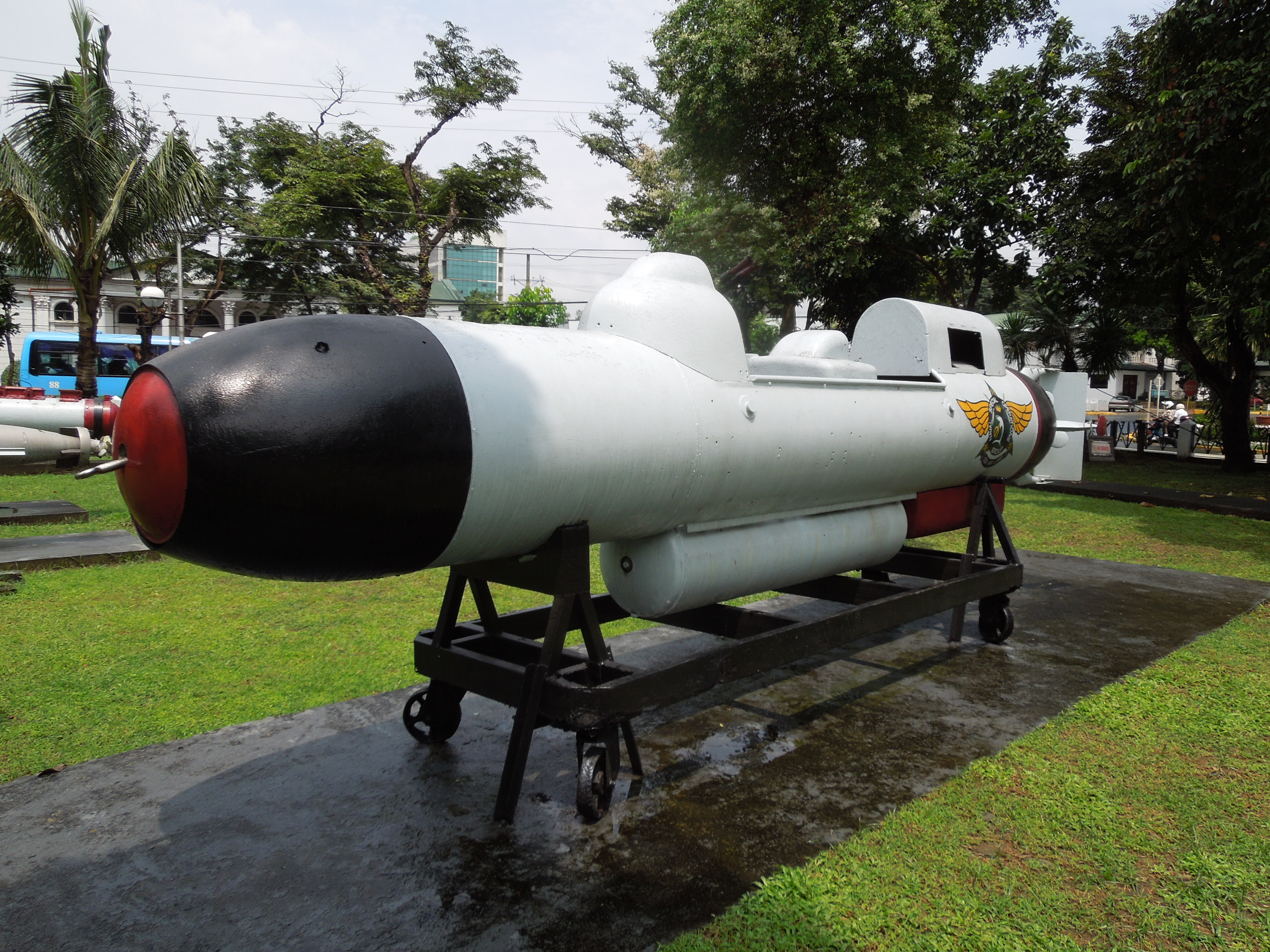
Armed Forces of the Philippines Museum, Camp Aguinaldo, Capinpin Street, Quezon City

The craft weighs 2,100 kilograms (4,600 lb) out of water and is 7 or 8 metres (23 ft 0 in or 26 ft 3 in) long according to type. It resembles a torpedo but has two cockpits for the crew. Some models have a roof with sliding doors for the cockpits. In some models the rear cockpit is long and can seat two divers for a total crew of three. Its battery-electric motors gives it a submerged range of 50 nautical miles (93 km; 58 mi) at 4 knots (7.4 km/h; 4.6 mph), the maximum speed being 5 knots (9.3 km/h; 5.8 mph). For long distance it generally reaches the operating area either attached to or towed by another vessel. A belly-pan beneath its hull can carry special equipment, or 230 kg (510 lb) of heavy explosive charges, or 150 kg (330 lb) of limpet mines, or small 'micro-torpedoes' stated to be for use against divers or small underwater vehicles. They were made in various variants and supplied to various countries. Models were designated according to maximum operating depth in metres, for example - /X30 means 30 m. X30, X60 and X100 versions were sold. The /X100T version was the most advanced type marketed showing the final evolution of the design. It has digital control module, displaying navigation and platform details, and a fully integrated autopilot.

Images (see the references below) of the roofed versions of these vehicles show no forward direct vision windows (but only side windows in the sliding doors), and pilot vision was by a screen in the cockpit from a television camera, likeliest in the front of the vehicle's hemispherical bow; this presumably would prevent carriage of a warhead or other load by attaching it to the front of the bow as was done on World War II human torpedoes.

== Timeline ==
- 1950s: The ex-Decima Flottiglia MAS member Ing. Pucciarini set up Cos.Mo.S Spa ('Cosmos'), which started to build wet subs for civilian and military use. The history of Cosmos was secretive and not well known.
- 1950/51: Cosmos started making a type of small "chariot"-type wetsub called Ippocampo (Italian for "seahorse") for tourist and sports use. Some had a petrol engine with a long intake air hose to a float; some had a battery-electric engine.
- Mid-1980s: Pucciarini sought retirement. The firm was eventually sold to Carlos Cardoen.
- Late 1980s: Cosmos had been negotiating a sale of wetsubs to Iraq, but Middle East politics interfered.
- April 1981: Woojungsa, a Korean scuba gear firm, was set up.
- 1993: Woojungsa set up Samcheok Yard.
- 1996: Woojungsa developed a Korean standard military drysuit.
- Woojungsa started making rigid inflatable boats, by technology transfer from Delta Power Services in UK.
- 1997: The IMF crisis broke out, and Korea found it easier to make its own boats than to import them; Woojungsa benefitted from this.
- Coastguards needed a better patrol boat for rough weather. This need was fulfilled by the first Korean self-righting patrol boat, which Woojungsa designed and made.
- 1999: Woosungja set up its Research and Development lab is established. The company name was changed to VOGO. It means "treasure house" in Korean, and it is similar to the name of the powerful maritime figure Jang Bogo from the Shilla period.
- 2000: VOGO started making aluminium ships.
- Early 2000s: The Italian Government closed Cosmos down, after a scandal that involved the illegal sale of technology to Saddam Hussein regime. Cosmos had transferred technology to WooJungSa (now Vogo Engineering). The good quality of Cosmos's products led to new small/wet-sub manufacturers to start making them, including in South Korea, UAE, Sweden and Indonesia.
- 2005: The latest (as at end of 2015) modern form of the CE2F submersible was developed.
- 2013: Woosungja developed a submersible that can operate on surface and underwater.

== Specification ==
- Length - 7 m (23 ft 0 in)
- Weight : 2.1 tonnes
- Maximum depth : 100 m (330 ft)
- Range: 50 nmi (93 km; 58 mi) at 4 knots (7.4 km/h; 4.6 mph)
- Speed : 5 knots (9.3 km/h; 5.8 mph) (underwater)
- Crew: 2

== List of customers ==
- Taiwan - CE2F/X30
- Greece - CE2F/X60
- Colombia - CE2F/X30 later upgraded to X60
- India - CE2F/X100
- Pakistan - CE2F/X??
- Argentina - CE2F/X60
- Egypt - CE2F
- South Korea - CE2F/X60
- Philippines - 3 x CE2F/X60 ordered in the 1960s for then Underwater Operations Unit. 1 preserved for display at Armed Forces of the Philippines Museum

== See also ==
- MT explosive motorboat – Weapon of the Regia Marina
- Wet sub – Ambient pressure diver propulsion vehicle
