= Comando Raggruppamento Subacquei e Incursori Teseo Tesei =

Italian special forces diving unit

Coordinates: 44°03′59″N 9°50′51″E

Divers and Raiders Group Command "Teseo Tesei"
- Comando Raggruppamento Subacquei e Incursori "Teseo Tesei" (COMSUBIN)
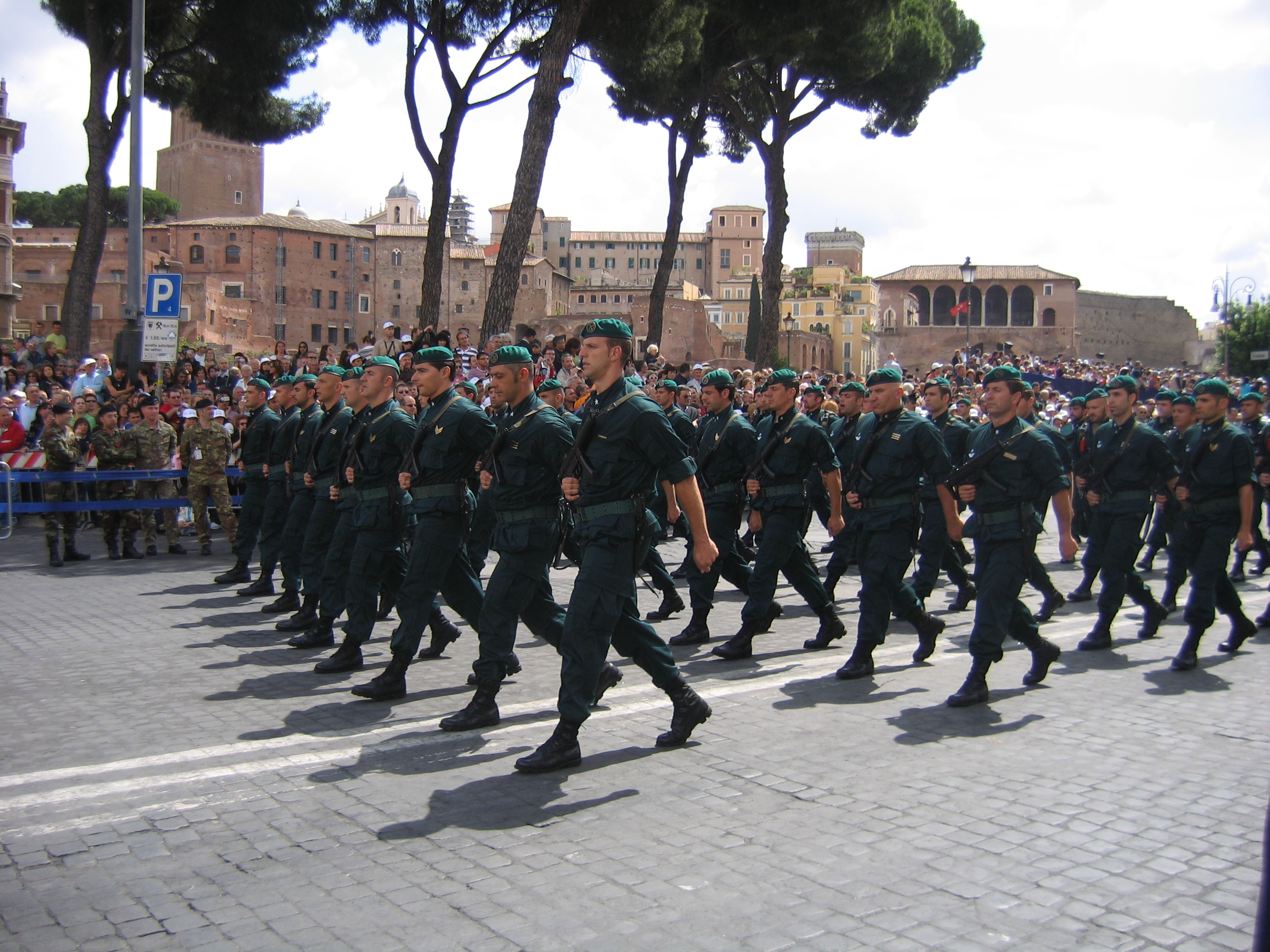
- Personnel of COMSUBIN
- Active: 1939–present
- Country: Italy
- Branch: Italian Navy
- Type: Special Forces
- Role: Search and rescue Special operations Direct Action
- Garrison/HQ: Varignano (HQ)
- Motto: "E Fluctibus irruit in hostem" (From the sea we assault the enemy)
- Engagements: World War II; Iraq War; War in Afghanistan; Lebanon Wars; UNOSOM
- Decorations: 1 Croci di Cavaliere all'O.M.I. 1 MOVM; 1 Medaglia d'argento al valor di Marina; 1 Medaglia d'argento al valor civile

Commanders
- Current commander: Rear Admiral Paolo Pezzutti
- Notable commanders: Admiral Gino Birindelli M.O.V. Admiral Luigi Faggioni M.O.V.

COMSUBIN (Comando Raggruppamento Subacquei e Incursori "Teseo Tesei"; Divers and Raiders Group Command "Teseo Tesei") is the Italian Navy's special operations unit. Italy was the first nation to use frogmen and human torpedoes. The Royal Italian Navy's Naval Assault Divisions are considered to be the precursor of modern Naval Special Forces. Their record can be traced back to World War I and the operation against the Austrian-Hungarian Battleship Viribus Unitis in Pula Harbour in 1918.

In World War II, famous operations include Suda Bay, Alexandria, Gibraltar, and Malta. Italy's frogman group originated in 1938 as the 1^{a} Flottiglia Mezzi d'Assalto (1st Flotilla Assault Vehicles), which was reformed in 1940 as the Decima Flottiglia MAS (10th Flotilla Assault Vehicles, 10a MAS).

== Chronology ==
See Operations of X MAS for Italian wartime frogman operations.

After World War II ended, the victors forbade Italy from maintaining special operations personnel. The Decima Flottiglia MAS was disbanded but the training experience gathered during the war was not lost, it was preserved in units scattered across the new Marina Militare.

- 1949: Italy joined the North Atlantic Council.
- 1955: Italy joined the United Nations. The Allied Powers relented. The Decima Flottiglia MAS was reformed, and had various names as the years passed.
- 1960: Its name was settled as Comando Raggruppamento Subacquei ed Incursori Teseo Tesei (Teseo Tesei Diver and Raider Commando Group, COMSUBIN) after Major Teseo Tesei.

COMSUBIN is currently based in three detachments near the Gulf of La Spezia in the Liguria region of north-west Italy. In keeping with its traditions, the command has long been known for its acquisition and use of unconventional weapons and small arms, such as the Armalite AR-10.

Some nations including Italy continued to make and keep human torpedoes after 1945.

Comsubin assisted in the investigation into the sinking of the yacht Bayesian.

== Organisation ==
The headquarters provides the services and maintenance needed for the groups to fulfill their missions. Part of the headquarter is the Research Office, which researches, develops and procures the materials and means needed by the operational groups.

=== Operational Raiders Group ===
The Operational Raiders Group (Gruppo Operativo Incursori - GOI) is an italian special forces unit and focuses on maritime special operations. The Raiders have four specific assignments:

- Attacks on naval and merchant ships while in port or at sea using a multitude of different weapons systems.
- Attacks on port or coastal civilian and military installations and infrastructure up to 400 km from the coast.
- Counter-terrorism operations especially on ships and dedicated to the recovery of hostages.
- Infiltration and long-term stays in hostile territory for reconnaissance or long-range naval targeting missions.

Raiders wear a green beret and are largely drawn from the ranks of the Navy's San Marco Marine Brigade.

=== Operational Divers Group ===
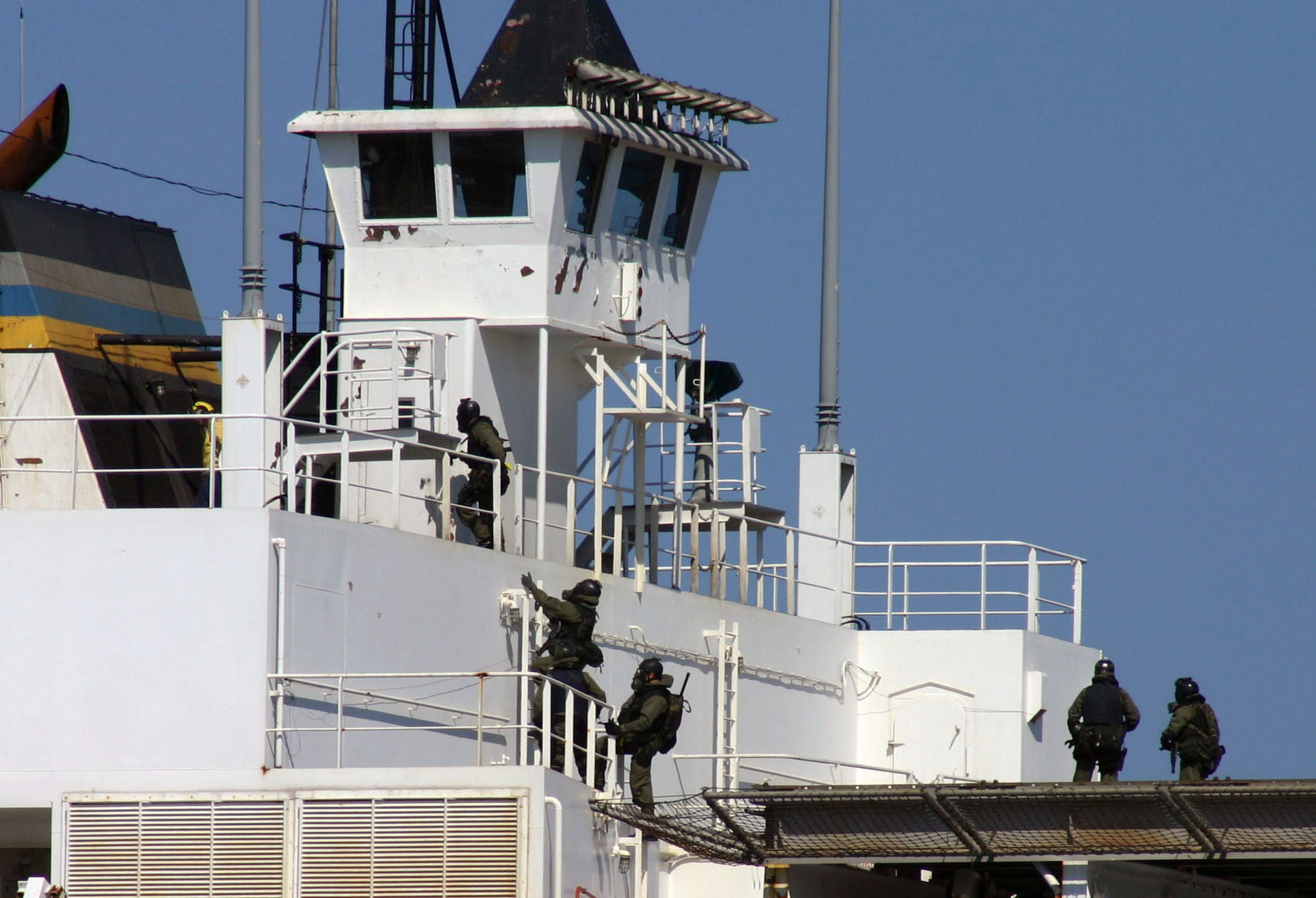
COMSUBIN commandos training on the Eugene A. Obregon (T-AK 3006) during exercise Clever Sentinel in 2004.

The Operational Divers Group (Gruppo Operativo Subacquei - GOS) specialises in scuba diving with air to 60 m, oxygen to 12 m, nitrox to 54 m, heliox to 150 m, and to 300 m with a mini-submarine or a special suit. After World War II the unit de-mined Italy's northern ports ravaged by years of war and filled with magnetic mines and ammunition onboard sunken ships. They accomplished the task by 1949, letting Italy's economy get back on track relatively quickly. Since World War II, they have performed de-mining and unexploded ordnance disposal operations across the world, especially in the Persian Gulf, the former Yugoslavia, and Albania. Diver detachments operate from the navy's minesweepers. They also specialise in rescuing personnel from stricken ships and submarines and assist the civil authorities in maritime rescue operations. Divers wear a medium blue beret.

=== Special Naval Group ===
The Special Naval Group (Gruppo Navale Speciale - COMGRUPNAVIN) supports and moves the raiders and the divers, with the aid of five ships:

- Marino-class diving support vessels: "Mario Marino" and "Alcide Pedretti"
- Cabrini-class high-speed patrol boats: "Angelo Cabrini" and "Tullio Tedeschi"
- Submarine rescue ship "Anteo" with a SRV-300 deep-submergence rescue vehicle

=== Schools Group ===
The Schools Group (Gruppo Scuole) consists of the Divers School, Raiders School and Underwater and Hyperbaric Medicine School.

== Operational capability ==
COMSUBIN (Comando Subacquei Incursori) is first and foremost a secret special operations unit. Its membership is a fairly well-guarded secret.

The Raiders are composed of volunteer officers and non-commissioned officers with an average age of 29 who are capable of:

- surface and under-water swimming
- use of naval units
- assault on stationary and moving naval units
- deployment from helicopters through various means
- movement during day and night in unknown and rocky terrain
- deployment from submarines while underwater and on surface
- use of automatic and commanded parachute
- use of arms, explosives and special weapons
- capability to reside in unknown hostile territory for long-term
- use of various land vehicles

After a member has qualified as a Raider, he may take up a number of specialisations including:

- Free Fall Parachutist (HALO/HAHO)
- Mountain Guide
- aerial photography analyst
- Explosive Ordnance Disposal
- Launch Director
- Military Mountain Troop Instructor
- Naval and Submarine Photographer

Former COMSUBIN Raiders may join other branches of the elite unit to continue serving the Navy or may join other parts of the military as instructors. Senior operators may transfer to the Italian Military Intelligence Agency "AISE" along with their other counterparts from the Army, Air Force and Carabinieri.

== Overseas deployment ==
COMSUBIN Raiders have been deployed to these places:

- Adriatic Sea, inspecting merchant navy ships due to UN embargo against the former Yugoslav republics.
- Albania, mostly to escort and patrol missions.
- Lebanon, mostly to escort and patrol missions.
- Persian Gulf, inspecting merchant navy ships due to UN embargo against Iran.
- Rwanda, evacuating Westerners from missionary outposts during the bitter civil war in Rwanda in 1994–95.
- Somalia, mostly to escort and patrol missions.
- Afghanistan, in support of ISAF.
- Iraq, in support of Antica Babilonia (the Italian contingent of Multinational force)
- Libya

== Equipment ==
The COM.SUB.IN. has a dedicated array of weaponry and equipment.

=== Knife ===
- Extrema Ratio GOI .S.E.R.E.

=== Handguns ===
- Glock 17
- Beretta APX
- HK USP
- Glock 41
- Beretta 92 FS
- HK P11

=== Sub-machine guns ===
- Beretta M12
- Spectre M4
- H&K MP5
- FN P90
- H&K MP7

=== Assault rifles ===
- Beretta ARX160
- Colt M4
- H&K HK416
- HK G41, license-manufactured by Luigi Franchi S.p.A.
- HK 417
- SIG MCX
- FN SCAR-L
- FN SCAR-H
- Heckler & Koch G36

=== Shotguns ===
- Benelli M4 Super 90
- Beretta RS202
- Benelli M3

=== Sniper rifles ===
- Accuracy International AWP (7.62×51mm)
- Heckler & Koch MSG-90 (7.62×51mm)
- Knight's Armament Company SR-25 (7.62×51mm)
- Accuracy International AXMX (8.6×70mm)
- Sako TRG-42 (8.6×70mm)
- Accuracy International AX50 (12.7×99mm)
- Barrett M107 (12.7×99mm)

=== Grenade launchers ===
- M203 grenade launcher
- 40x53mm Heckler & Koch AG36
- Beretta GLX 160

=== Machine guns and automatic grenade launcher ===
- FN Minimi MK 48/46
- M60E3
- MG42/59
- Browning M2
- H&K GMG

=== Rocket launchers ===
- M72A5 (66mm)
- C90-CR (M3) (90mm)
- Spike-SR (170mm)
