= SRV-300 =

Deep-submergence rescue vehicle

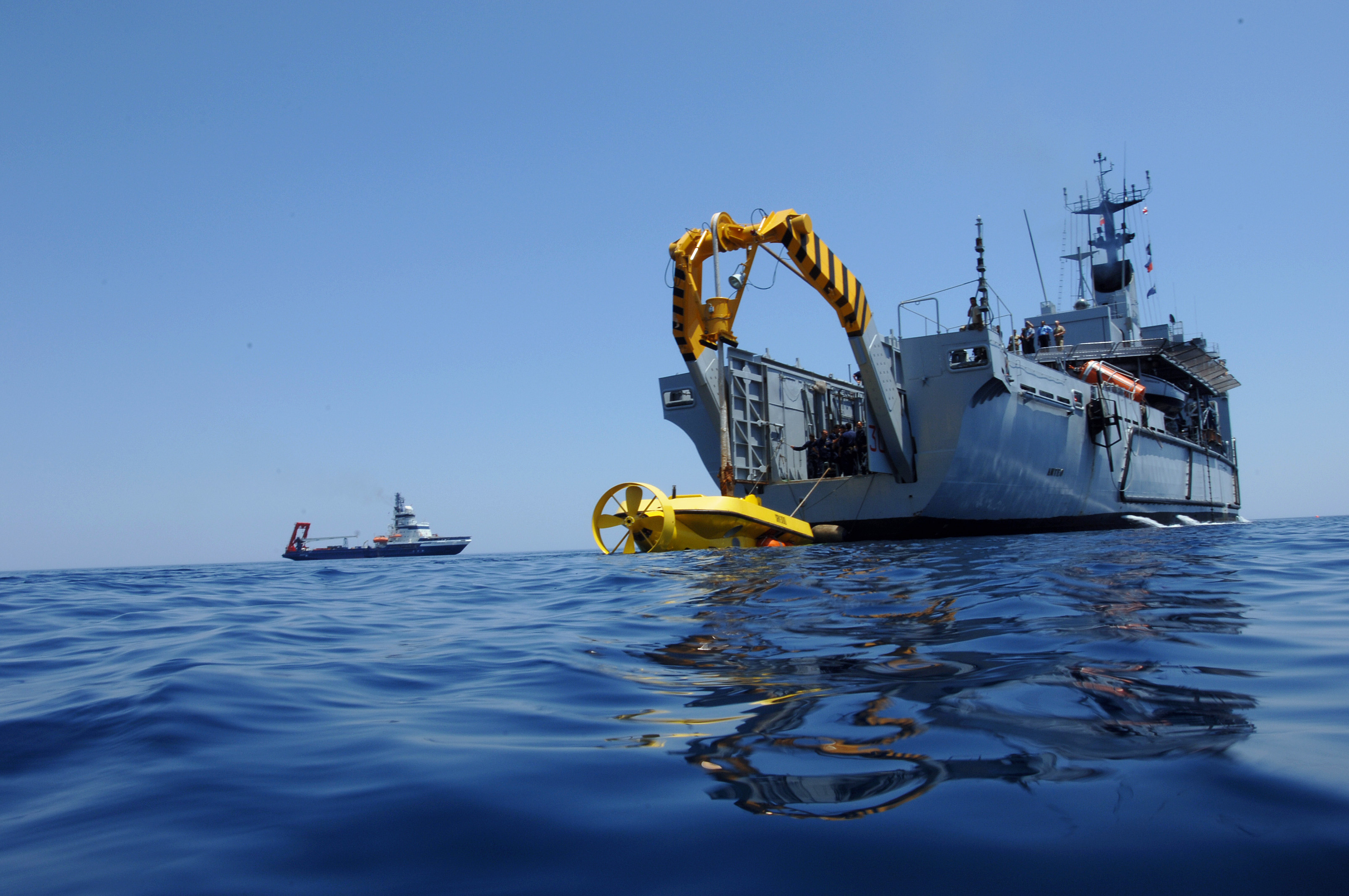
- DRASS Galeazzi SRV-300 launched by mother ship Anteo, Gulf of Taranto, 2005

History

Italy
- Name: SRV-300
- Builder: DRASS (Livorno)
- Launched: 1998
- Commissioned: 1999

General characteristics
- Class & type: deep submergence rescue vehicle
- Displacement: 27.3 tons
- Length: 8.46 m (27.8 ft)
- Beam: 3.13 m (10.3 ft)
- Installed power: 20 kW
- Propulsion: Electric motors; Main propulsion, horizontal angle up to ± 45°; Auxiliary propulsion, 4x10Kw thrusters for transverse and vertical motion
- Speed: 2.5 knots (4.6 km/h; 2.9 mph) (3 knots (5.6 km/h; 3.5 mph) without skirt)
- Range: 15 nmi (28 km; 17 mi)
- Capacity: 12 rescuees
- Complement: 2 (pilot and co-pilot)
- Sensors & processing systems: SIMRAD EM-1002 multibeam echo-sounder

SRV-300 is a deep-submergence rescue vehicle that is rated to dive up to 300 m (980 ft). It was built by DRASS (Livorno) for the Marina Militare, and is capable of descending to 300 metres (980 ft) carrying 12 passengers in addition to crew. SRV-300 is hosted by Anteo, berthed at La Spezia.

SRV-300 supplanted the Breda MSM-1S USEL deep-submergence rescue vehicle, in 2002 and since 2004 it has been fitted with a Simrad EM-1002 multibeam echo-sounder. Further upgrades in 2010 introduced air portability.

There is a new version under development, the SRV-650, with a maximum depth of 650 m (2 133 ft) and with a hosting capacity of 15 people.

== See also ==
- Italian ship Anteo (A 5309)
- Deep-submergence rescue vehicle – Submersible used for rescue of people from disabled submarines and submersibles
- MSM-1S USEL – Italian deep-submergence rescue vehicle
