= Drass (company) =

Italian manufacturing company

DRASS Group
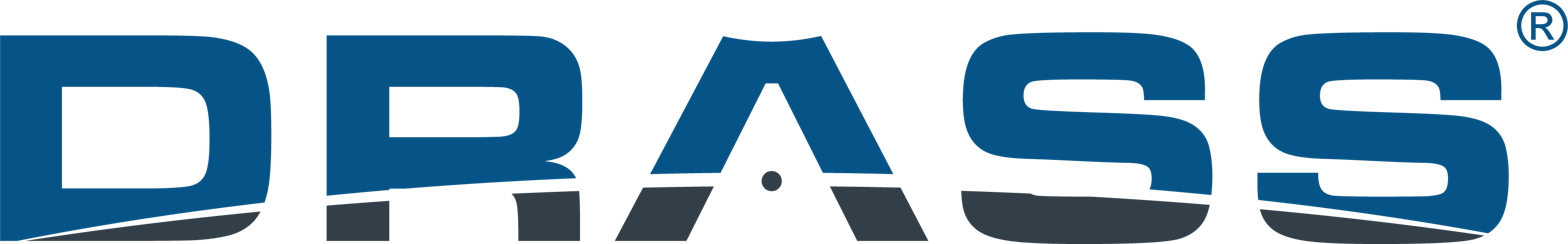
- Company type: S.r.l.
- Industry: Defense, marine engineering
- Founded: 1927; 99 years ago
- Founder: Roberto Galeazzi
- Headquarters: Livorno, Province of Livorno, Tuscany, Italy
- Area served: Worldwide
- Key people: Sergio Cappelletti (chief executive officer)
- Products: Midget submarines, swimmer delivery vehicle, diving equipment
- Number of employees: 200
- Website: www.drass.tech

Drass, or DRASS, is an Italian manufacturing company headquartered in Livorno, whose best known for their range of midget submarine and swimmer delivery vehicle. The company also has a line of hyperbaric chambers for diver decompression. Work is done at Livorno and also Ghiroda, Romania.

== History ==
=== Beginnings ===
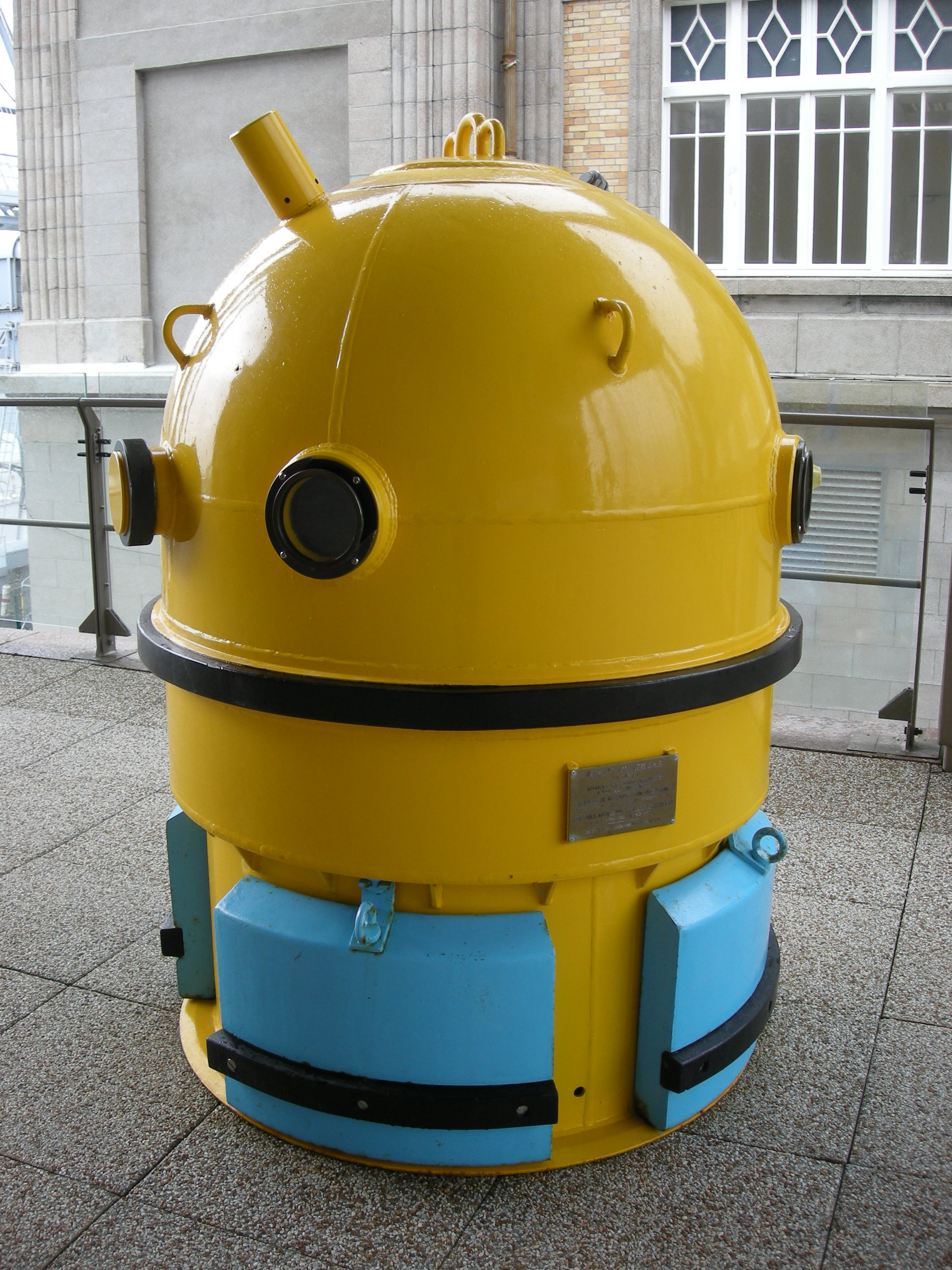
A 1968 Galeazzi dry bell on display at Cité de la Mer

The beginnings of the company date to 1927 when Roberto Galeazzi patented a hydrostatic pressure-resistant submarine hull. The patent was then approved by the Regia Marina which led to Galeazzi designing hulls for the Calvi-class submarines in the 1930s. Based on the 1927 patent, Galeazzi attempted to design a submarine himself and by 1929 he submitted his specifications for the "Great Oceanic Colonial Submarine" to the Italian Navy. The submarine had a weight of 3,800 tonnes (3,700 long tons), a length of 120 metres (390 ft) and was to be capable of speeds of 9.5 knots (17.6 km/h; 10.9 mph) when immersed and 24 knots (44 km/h; 28 mph) on the surface. The armament consisted of twin turrets of 152 millimetres (6.0 in) guns, and eight torpedo tubes. The submarine did not enter production, however its design went on to inspire other conventional submarines.

In 1930, Galeazzi founded his company in La Spezia. Another important patent by Galeazzi was a butoscopic turret (Torretta Butoscopica). The turret was used to establish a world record in 1930 by reaching a depth of 275 metres. In 1932, Galeazzi's company also produced the butoscopic turret designed and used by Alberto Gianni in the salvage of SS Egypt. The butoscopic turrets produced by Galeazzi were used well into the 1970s with one notable customer being explorer Jacques Cousteau. Drass further developed the turret into a diving bell for deep diving and rescue operations.

In 1935, Galeazzi patented an atmospheric diving suit based on the design of his butoscopic turret. The suit set the world record for deep diving immersion in 1938. Several navies used it since the 1940s. Also in the 1940s, the Galeazzi company provided diving equipment for the Italian Navy special forces.

=== 1960s to present ===
In 1968, Drass was established in Livorno as a manufacturing company supporting the Sub Sea Oil Services (SSOS) company. The two companies then succeeded in the first operational saturation diving with the Capshell system at Porto Santo Stefano in the same year. In 1978, Drass acquired the Galeazzi company which became the Drass Galeazzi company.

In the 1970s, Drass and SSOS began manufacturing a self-propelled diving bell known as "The Flying Bell" which was designed by Sergio Carlini. Other deep diving equipment was produced in the 1980s, such as the Diving Decompression System that was provided by Drass for the Micoperi 7000 semi-submersible crane vessel.

After the collapse of Cos.Mo.S in the early 2000s, Drass took over many of its product lines. Since then, Drass has built vessels for both the Italian military and the export market, with the company's DG class of midget submarines presented at the Euronaval 2016 exhibition in Paris. In 2007, the company's operations were expanded to Romania when Drass Romania SRL was founded.

== Products ==
=== SRV-300 ===
The SRV-300 is a deep-submergence rescue vehicle that is rated to dive up to 300 m (980 ft).

=== DG-160 ===
The DG-160 is a midget submarine that has an estimated displacement of 169 tons submerged.

=== DG-550 ===
The DG-550 is a submarine that is dedicated to operations in brown and blue waters.

=== DG-900 ===
The DG-900 is a submarine that has an estimated displacement of 900 tons submerged.

== See also ==
- CABI Cattaneo
