= Parachute Training School =

Parachute Training School may mean:

- Parachute Training School (Australian Army), adjacent to HMAS Albatross, Nowra, New South Wales, Australia
- No. 1 Parachute Training School RAF, in England, initially based at RAF Ringway (which is now Manchester Airport) and currently based at RAF Brize Norton
- Parachute Training School (Pakistan Army), Pakistan Army's Para Training School located at Peshawar
