= Ashfaq Hussain (Pakistan Army officer) =

Colonel (retd) Ashfaq Hussain
- Born: Lahore
- Education: PMA Kakul
- Occupation: writer

Ashfaq Hussain is a Pakistani military analyst, author, motivational speaker, and a former member of the Army Special Service Group. He had served as a senior officer in the media wing of the Pakistan Army.

His seminal work, the Gentleman series – five books on his experiences while serving in the Pakistan army – is popular in Pakistan's bookstores. The book series is a humorous account of his experience in the Pakistan army.

His sixth book "Witness to Blunder: Kargil Story Unfolds" was on the Kargil war. Hussain was a colonel in the Inter Services Public Relations Directorate (ISPR) during the time of the Kargil war. Husasin has recounted his observations and experiences of the entire war in the book. His findings expressed in the book are based on direct interaction with Pakistani officers at multiple levels who were directly involved in Kargil war. He personally interviewed senior commanders, leaders, middle-level and also junior officers in the Pakistan Army. He is also renowned for his criticism of General (retd.) Pervez Musharraf for his misadventures during the Kargil War. Hussain was covered both in the national and international mainstream media for the revelations related to the Kargil war. He also alleged that Musharraf claimed only 270 deaths from the Pakistani army in the war.

== Publications ==
Books

- 1976: Gentleman Bismillah
- 1984: Gentleman Alhumdulillah
- 1994: Gentleman Allah Allah
- 2001: Gentleman Subhan Allah
- 2008: Witness to Blunder: Kargil Story Unfolds
- 2016: Gentleman Fi Arzillah
- Hussain, Ashfaq (2021). Iqtidar Ki Majbooriyan (اقتدار کی مجبوریاں) [The compulsions of power]. Biography of General Aslam Beg.
