= Special Service Group =

Special operations force of the Pakistan Army

- خصوصی خدمات گروہ
- Active: 23 March 1956; 70 years ago
- Country: Pakistan
- Branch: Pakistan Army
- Type: Special Forces
- Role: Special operations; Unconventional warfare; Foreign internal defence; Special reconnaissance; Direct action
- Size: ~3,000 (2012)
- Headquarters: Ghazi Airbase, Tarbela, Khyber Pakhtunkhwa
- Nicknames: Maroon Berets, Black Storks, SSG
- Mottos: Urdu: من جاں بازم, lit. 'I am valiant'
- Colours: Maroon, sky blue
- Engagements: See list: Indo-Pakistani wars and conflicts; Kashmir conflict (1947–present); Indo-Pakistani War of 1965; Indo-Pakistani War of 1971; Siachen conflict (1984–2003) Conflicts in the Arab World; Grand mosque seizure; Omani Civil War Afghanistan Conflict (1978–present); Soviet Afghan war; Operation Cyclone; Battle for Hill 3234; Operation Magistral; Raids inside Soviet Union during Soviet Afghan War Sri Lankan Civil War; Military assistance to Sri Lanka U.S.−led War on Terror; War in Afghanistan (2001–present); Insurgency in Khyber Pakhtunkhwa; Operation al-Mizan; Operation Rah-e-Rast; Operation Silence; Operation Rah-e-Nijat; Operation Janbaz; Operation Black Thunderstorm; 2014 Peshawar school massacre; Operation Zarb-e-Azb; Operation Radd-ul-Fasaad; 2022 Bannu counterterrorism centre attack and siege; Operation Azm-e-Istehkam United Nations Missions; Bosnian War; UN Protection Force—Pakistan Internal Conflicts; Insurgency in Balochistan (1948–present); Dir campaign; Sectarian conflicts in Pakistan; Indian Airlines Flight 423
- Website: Official Website

Commanders
- Commander: Major General Ahmad Jawad
- Notable commanders: A.O. Mitha; Tariq Mehmood; Ameer Faisal Alavi

Insignia
- Flag: Flag of Special Services Group

SSG paratroopers landing in Kalam Valley, 2014.

The Special Service Group (SSG; Urdu: خصوصی خدمات گروہ) is the special operations forces of the Pakistan Army. They are also known by their nickname of "Maroon Berets" due to the colour of their headgear.

The SSG is responsible to deploy and execute five doctrinal missions: foreign internal defence, reconnaissance, direct action, counter-terrorism operations, and unconventional warfare.

Other operational roles and responsibilities attributed to the SSG include: search and rescue, counter-proliferation, search and destroy, hostage rescue, information operations, peacekeeping missions, psychological operations, security assistance, and HVT manhunts.

The chain of command and control of the SSG falls within the domain of the Pakistan Army's Strategic Forces Command (ASFC), and many of its personnel are directly recruited into the Inter-Services Intelligence (ISI)'s counter-terrorism division or SS directorate upon their retirement. Much of the SSG's activities and operations are shrouded in secrecy and public knowledge of their work is heavily controlled through selective declassified documents and published literary works by retired military veterans or authorized media.

== History ==
=== Roots of establishment ===
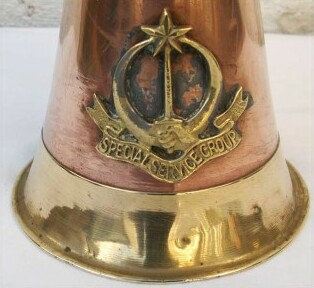
The vintage and classical Arm's SSG Insignia.

In 1950, the Pakistan Army established the school, Close Quarter Battle School, dedicated for teaching the methods of close quarters combat under Colonel Grant Taylor of the British Army in Quetta, Balochistan in Pakistan– the school was later moved to Attock under Colonel Kahoon, also an officer in the British Army. Citing unknown and unspecified reasons, the Close Quarter Battle School under Col. Kahoon was permanently closed and its passed out personnel who had earlier formed the 312th Garrison Company (312 Gar Coy (FF)), a light infantry, initially attached the military unit to the Frontier Force Regiment (FF Regiment) in 1952— the 312 Gar Coy (FF) still remains a part of the Frontier Force Regiment.

=== Creation from the 19th Regiment ===
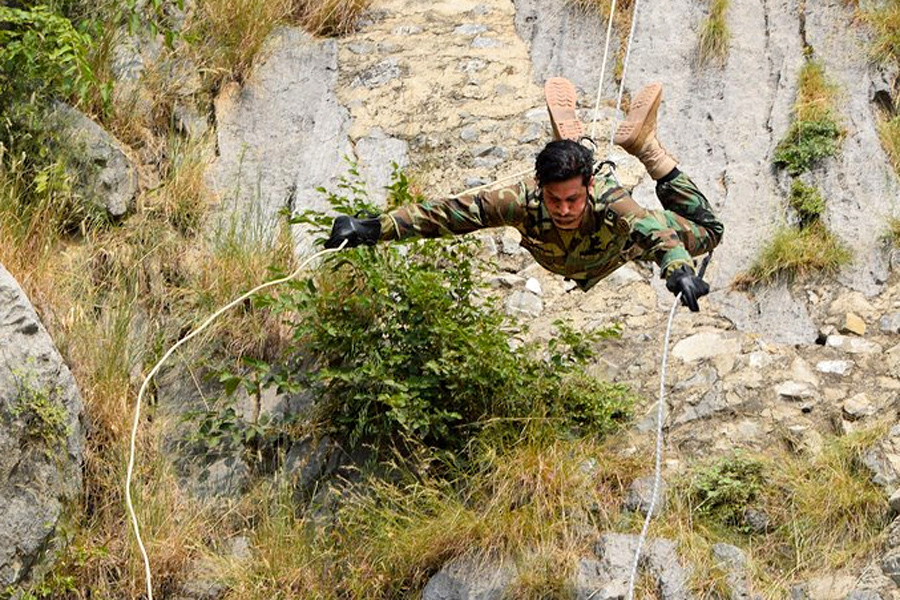
An Army SSG specialist, in U.S. Woodland uniform, performing the Mountain warfare course in a demonstration being performed for the Russian Spetnaz in 2016.

In 1953–54, the United States Army raised a special forces unit within the Pakistan Army to provide intelligence and combat defense against Soviet Union's expanding sphere of influence in Central Asia. The U.S. assistance helped raise the special forces unit from the simple infantry regiment, the 19th Baloch, that provided an ideal cover from its covert nature of works. In 1955, the 17th Baloch infantry was incorporated with the 19th Baloch, followed by the special forces training began to conduct under Lt Col. Donald W. Bunte from the Special Forces of the United States Army.

On 23 March 1956, the Special Service Group (SSG) was established as a Battalion under the command of its first commanding officer, Lieutenant-Colonel A. O. Mitha, after founding the School of Special Operations (SSO) under the advisement of army officers from the U.S. Army's Special Forces. The Special Service Group's institution and the physical training remained under the command of Lt-Col. Mitha until 1961–62. The headquarter of the Army Special Service Group was then based out in Cherat, Khyber-Pakhtunkhwa in Pakistan.

Initially, the SSG were popular as the Green Berets with Baloch insignia in the 1950s, but SSG dropped their green berets in favor of adopting the Baloch Regiment's maroon berets– hence giving them the nickname the Maroon Berets. In 1964, the Parachute Training School (PTS) was established under the watchful guidance of 101st Airborne Division of the U.S. Army, and training on the desert warfare with U.S. Special Forces' Mobile Training Team begin, followed by the Navy SSG established by the U.S. Navy SEALs as a deep diving team, which was known for its physical training in Karachi in 1966–70.

In 1970, the Musa Company was established that solely specialized in anti-terrorist operations, receiving training from the British Special Air Service advisers after U.S. had suspended the International Military Education and Training program with Pakistan in 1981.

The SSG initially had six battalions and each battalion had specialization units, specialized in the different war spectrum: desert, mountain, long-distance ranger, and deep diving warfare. In August 1965, the operational scope of the Army SSG was expanded from a battalion-size to larger special operation outfit. In 1968–70, the Pakistan Army integrated the Chinese introduced physical training, tactics, weapons, and equipments.

== Deployments and covert operations ==
=== Covert actions, Indo-Pakistani wars, and overseas missions ===
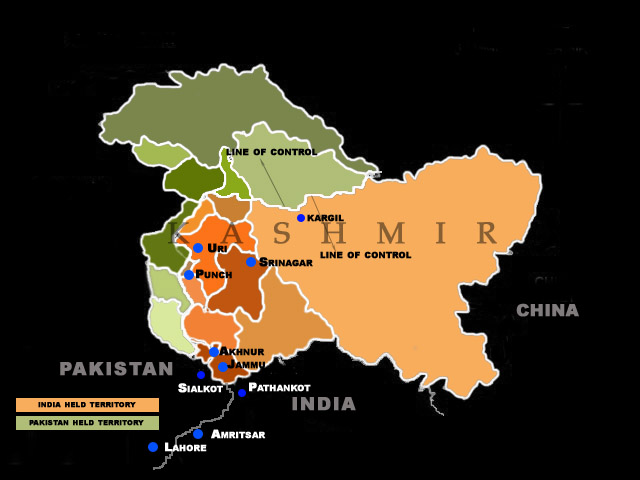
The Kashmir Valley in 1965: The Army Special Service Group teams were successful in their infiltration mission in 1964 but the plan failed when the local Kashmiris alerted the Indian agencies of this expedition, resulting India mounting an invasion on Pakistan in 1965.

The first war time deployment of the Army Special Service Group took place in 1960 with their first special reconnaissance mission in the former tribal belt near the porous Durand Line– the Afghanistan-Pakistan's line of international border. In 1960–61, the Army Special Forces team under Major Mirza Aslam Beg had successfully inserted in Dir and took control of the law and order situation by removing the instigating Nawab of Dir in Chitral in North-West Frontier Province.

In 1964–65, the teams of Special Service Group that entered Indian-administered Kashmir failed in executing Operation Gibraltar due to lack of understanding of the local culture and language and was eventually met with hostility from the locals who alerted the Indian government authorities.

The second war with India saw the testing and shaping of the Army Special Service Group when the Indian Army charged and invaded the Pakistan-side of Punjab in response to the covert actions took place in Indian Administered Kashmir. The airborne missions of the Army Special Service Group included performing the combat parachuting at the Indian airbases with an intention of launching a ground assaults in the Indian Air Force's air stations in Pathankot, Adampur, and the Halwara. 180 SSG commandos boarded a Pakistan Air Force's C-130 Hercules, the three airborne formations were flown detected on the night of 7 September 1965, first performing combat jumping at Pathankot at 02:30 hours but the wind velocity led to the scattering of the teams, due to the difficult terrain and poor visibility, none of the teams were able to re-group after the drop. Of the 180 commandos dropped, 138, including all officers but one, were captured and safely taken to prisoner of war (POW) camps. Twenty-two were lynched by villagers armed with sticks, police and even bands of muleteers released by the Indian Army, from the animal transport battalion of the nearby Corps headquarters.

Only 20 commandos were unaccounted for and most escaped back to Pakistan under the fog. Most of these were from the Pathankot group, dropped less than 10 km from the border in an area that had plenty of ravines, riverine tracks to navigate back along. One notable, commando-style escape was of Major Hazur Hasnain, the Halwara group commander who, along with his friend, hijacked a jeep and somehow managed to return safe.

The Pakistani accounts, the latest of which comes now from several participants in the wake of the 1965 at 50 commemorations, acknowledged the SSG-commando disaster but blamed it on poor briefing, planning and callous arrogance of the commanders. Some of these former Pakistani soldiers even write about having met some of these paratroopers and exchanged notes with them on how badly planned the operation was. Here is the account of Col SG Mehdi, himself a commando officer then. The fortified forces ’ conditioning in no way undermines its elevation, but by blocking free speech, the government has politicized the issue and brought the military leadership into the global spotlight. By 1970–71, the Pakistan Army had permanently posted one Army Special Service Group 3rd Commando Battalion in East-Pakistan under Lt-Col. Tariq Mehmood, begin working with local authorities in maintaining security situation in the East-Pakistan, near the border of Eastern India. The performance of the Army Special Service Group was reported to be much better than their performance in 1965, with 1st Command Battalion (Yaldram) and 2nd Commando Battalion (Rahber) engaged in several of their successful sabotage missions against the Indian Army's artillery and infantry regiments, while the 3rd Command Battalion in East oriented towards successfully engaging in the seek and destroy missions. Their final mission included the mounting of the successful defense of the Shahjalal International Airport against the Indian Army-backed Mukti Bahini, and were the last army special forces formation that had departed from the airport before the Dacca fall to India on 16 December 1971.

From 1972 to 1977, the Pakistan Army went into reorganization and major restructuring of its combat services but the Army Special Service Group remained active in successfully tackling the armed insurgency in Balochistan in Pakistan.

=== War in Afghanistan ===
In 1979–89, the Army Special Service Group had been seconded in covert actions in Afghanistan against the Soviet Union's armed intervention. There have been unconfirmed reports of the Army Special Service Group engaging in armed battles with the Soviet paratroopers in incidents including the Battle for Hill 3234 and the Operation Magistral.

When the Battle for Hill 3234 concluded, the Soviet paratroopers found that the Afghan mujahideen actually wore the black uniforms with rectangular black-yellow-red stripes, and suspected to be Army Special Service Group personnel; Pakistan's government has officially denied their involvement. The American author, Aukai Collins, identified the elements as "Black Storks" who crossed the border to join the Afghan mujahideen – a claim also backed by American author, David Campbell. Another battle was taken place between the Soviet paratroopers and the Afghan mujahideen in Kunar in 1986 that suspected the Army Special Service Group's involvement but the Russians dismissed the claim and noted that the battle was fought between the GRU's 15th Spetsnaz Brigade and Abdul Rab Rasul Sayyaf's group.

=== Siachen, Kargil, and war on terror ===
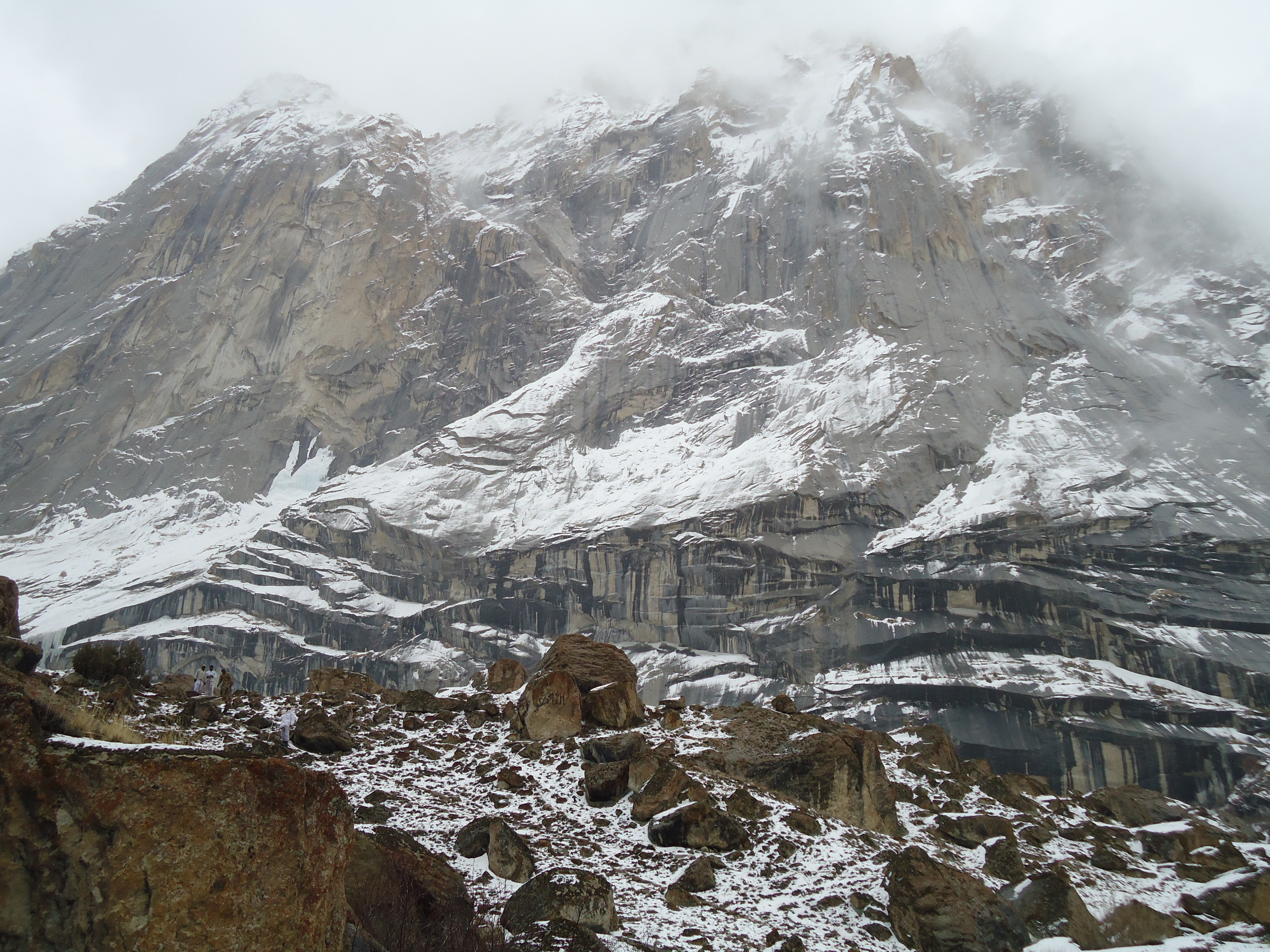
View of the Siachen Glacier from the Pakistani side. According to medical reports released by the Pakistan Army Medical Corps, Pakistani soldiers mostly die due to the zero temperature and lack of oxygen as compared to engagements with the Paramilitary forces of India, who are mostly deployed at the much warmer areas nearing Leh district.

When the Indian Army's conducted an expedition to take control of the Siachen Glacier from Pakistan, the ISI's Covert Action Division (CAD) inserted in the region, confirming the intrusion and movement of Indian Army soldiers in 1983. The Army Special Service Group was immediately deployed to engage in the armed battle with the Indian Army at 20,000 feet (6,100 m) above sea level. Led by Captain Muhammad Iqbal, the only 12-men Army Special Service team had to hiked at the 19,000 feet (5,800 m) to reach the Indian Army's resting camp. The battle with the Indian Army ensued and Special Service Group commandos but they did not gain much due to adverse weather conditions and enormous heights

Over the years, the Army Special Service Group have developed expertise in high altitude warfare, and are regularly deployed in Siachen.

Since 2001, the Army Special Forces have been engaged in counterinsurgency and counter-terrorism operations in Afghanistan and remote areas in areas adjacent to Afghanistan—their notable operations in Pakistan included the 2007 Lal Masjid siege in Islamabad. The Special Forces teams also taken parts in raiding and attacking the terrorists elements in near border with Afghanistan, working often with U.S. Army's Special Forces in Afghanistan.

In 2014, the Special Service Group were reportedly successful in their manhunt operation after targeting and killing of Adnan Gulshair, a Saudi citizen known as the Global Operations Chief of al-Qaeda.

In January 2013, India accused Pakistan that the Army Special Service Group led an attack across the Line of Control in which Indian soldiers were killed.

On the night of 8–9 October 2023 a Special Service Group member Major Ali Raza was killed in action in Sambaza.

== Organizational structure ==
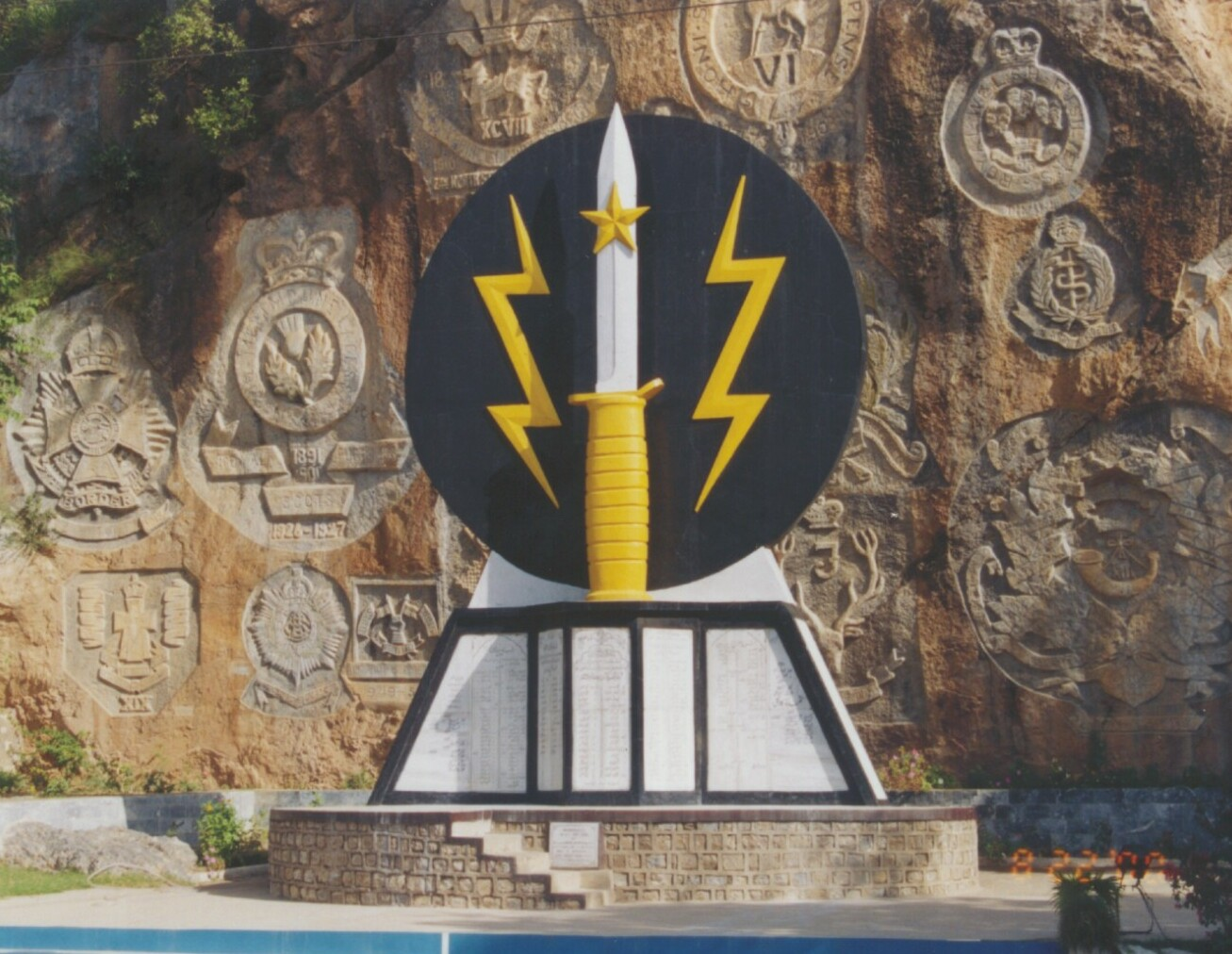
The Army's SSG Insignia outside SSG garrison and former headquarters at Cherat.

Due to their selection competitiveness, demanding military physicals, and commitment required per standard of the Army's Special Forces, the Special Service Group was restricted to the Brigade level until June 2003. On 14 June 2003, the major reorganization in the structure of the Army Special Service Group took place when the special forces were moved as a military division with Major-General A. F. Alvi becoming the first general officer commanding (GOC).

In an official documentary recognized and known structure of the Army Special Service Group given in YouTube is given below:

- Army SSG Divisional Headquarters Official Source only available in Urdu
  - Iqbal Buland Company
  - Musa Company
  - Parachute Training School
  - Special Operation School
  - Tarbela Brigade Special Operation Task Force (SOTF)
    - 3 Commando Battalion Powindahs
    - Zarrar Company
    - 8 Commando Battalion (Al-Azb)
  - Brigade HQ in Cherat Name not given in Documentary
    - 5 Commando Battalion (Zilzaal)
    - 6 Commando Battalion (Al-Samsaam)
    - 7 Commando Battalion (Babrum)
  - 11 SS Brigade HQ in Attock
    - 1 Commando Battalion (Yaldram)
    - 2 Commando Battalion (Rahber)
    - 4 Commando Battalion (Yalghar)

Notes: Source of officially recognized and known structure of the Army Special Service Group given in YouTube.

The early organizational structure of the Army's Special Service Group was initially based on the regimental system, with three battalions specialized in the military diving, airborne, mountain warfare techniques. After the third war with India in 1971, the Army Special Service Group was expanded with the eight battalions that specialized in their own set of war course of actions–each battalions is specialized in their criterion of war and are considered specialists in their fields.

The Special Service Group is headquartered at Ghazi Airbase, Tarbela, while its training school is located at Cherat. The operational responsibility of the special operations conducted by the Army Special Service Group, nonetheless, falls under the command of the Army Strategic Forces Command (ASFC) operating from the Army GHQ in Rawalpindi, along with the Rangers and Strategic Plans Division Force–the CBRN defense team.

=== Battalions in the Special Forces ===
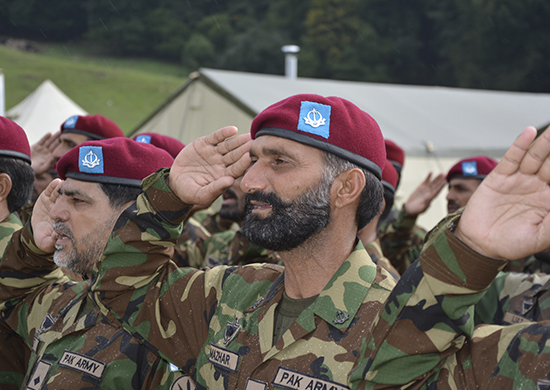
Pakistan Army soldiers saluting during a tactical exercise with Russian Ground Forces, wearing their maroon berets for which they are known for.

The Special Service Group is organized into eight battalions and three companies – all trained and specialists in the specific type of war operations. However, the Army has never issued an actual strength number for the special forces. The official strength of each battalion is treated as classified information.

The SSG battalions are each typically commanded by a lieutenant colonel (varies, and depends on availability), and the battalions are organized into groups under the command of colonels. The overall commander of the Special Service Group is a major general whose identity is also kept secret.

SSG Battalions	Call Sign	Headquarters	Detail
1st Commando Battalion	Yaldram	Attock	Headquartered with the 11 SS Brigade HQ in Attock, Punjab in Pakistan, along with 2nd and 4th Commando Battalions. The 1st Commando Battalion (Yaldram) is an airborne unit and its known for its ability and capability of remarkably performing the HAHO/HALO parachuting techniques.:77[46]
2nd Commando Battalion	Rahber	Attock	Headquartered with the 11 SS Brigade HQ in Attock, Punjab in Pakistan, along with 2nd and 4th Commando Battalions. The 2 Commando Battalion (Rahber) is known for its theoretically oriented in the desert warfare.:77[46]
3rd Commando Battalion	Powindahs	Tarbela	Headquartered in Tarbela, along with 8th Commando Battalion and Zarrar Company. The 3 Commando Battalion (Powindas) are oriented towards the high-altitude mountain warfare in Kashmir.:77[46]
4th Commando Battalion	Yalghar		
5th Commando Battalion	Zilzaal		
6th Commando Battalion	al-Samsaam		
7th Commando Battalion	Babrum		
8th Commando Battalion	al-Azb		

Flag of Zarrar company

SSG Companies	Call Sign	Headquarters	Details
Zarrar Company	Seek and Destroy		Zarrar is Special Service Group's elite counter terrorist unit. Zarrar operators qualify after specialized training in counter-terrorism tactics, hostage rescue, intelligence recon, sabotage and other high risk operations. [47]
SOCU Company	SOCU		Special Operation & Communication Unit. Zarrar can not operate without SOCU
Iqbal Company		Tarbela	Oriented towards the SIGNIT and ELINT in signals and telecommunications.
Musa Company		Mangla	Oriented towards the army's frogman to perform underwater demolition–secondary role in counterterrorism on seaborne actions with Navy.[12]

Sources:Sharma, Rajeev (1999). Pakistan's Proxy War: A Story of ISI, Bin Laden and Kargil. New Delhi, India: Kaveri Book Service. p. 223. ISBN 9788174790354.. For a description of the modern special forces, see: global context of the Special forces.

== Selection and training ==
=== Qualifications and physicals ===
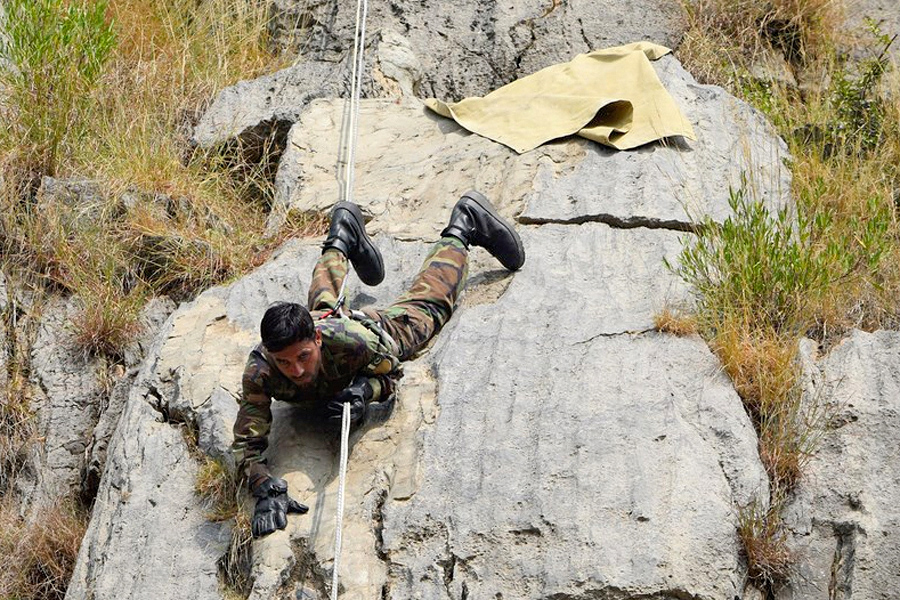
An Army SSG soldier performing descent during the mountain warfare course demonstrated for the Russian Ground Forces in 2016.

The Army specialist recruiter teams usually visit the different headquarters of the army's formation, distributing the pamphlets to the officers at OF-1 rank and enlisted personnel. The military physical standards, examinations, and criteria are same for the Army, Navy, Air Force, and Marines' special forces selections and training, often training in close coordination.

The Navy Special Service Group (SSGN) plays an important role in the overall architecture of the special operations forces, their qualification standards, fitness at all levels, and eligibility required for the security clearances.

There are three schools that the overall basic eligibility requirements to be considered for entry into the schools of the Special Forces are:

- Special Operations School (Spec Ops.)
  - Be age of ≥ 25–39.
  - Be a citizen of Pakistan.
  - Must be Volunteered, not coerced.
  - Minimum of 5 Years of military service.
  - Must pass the Physical Fitness Assessment with at least 40 push-ups in one minute, 40 sit-ups in one minute, 15 pull-ups, and be able to run 1.6 kilometers in a maximum of 7:30.
  - Meet medical fitness standards as outlined in Medical Category TV.
  - Eligible for a secret security clearance.
  - Must have 20/20 or corrected to 20/20 in both near and distant vision in both eyes.
  - Should be able to swim 30 meters in full service uniform with weapon, the standard rifle, Koch G3A3.
- Sniper School
  - Must have 20/20 or corrected to 20/20 in both near and distant vision in both eyes.
  - Medical Category "A".
- Frogman School
  - Medical Category "A".
  - Must have qualification in Chamber test up to 180 feet sea water.
- Swimming Standards
  - Should be able to swim 200 meters in 7 minutes (breast stroke).
  - Should be able to swim 25 meters Underwater.

=== Selection and training ===
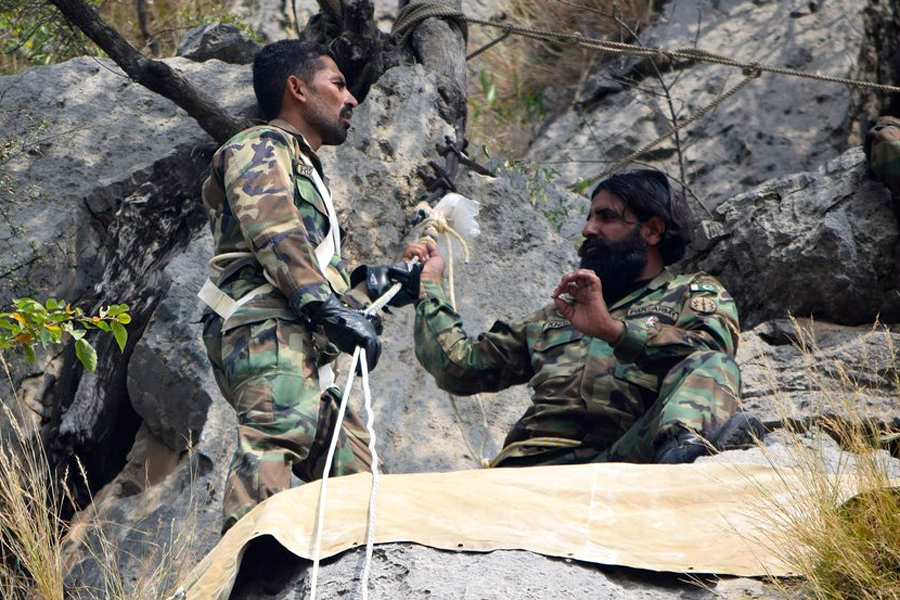
The Army SSG personnel preparing the mountain hike and survival skill sets in a demonstration being performed to the Russian Ground Forces's Spetsnaz in 2016.

The medical standards in various physical courses into the entrance in the Special Forces in Pakistan are maintained to be very high and extremely competitive, resulting in a high dropout rate even at the very early stage of selection, according to the Pakistan Army's official report in 2013. The Pakistan Army's Medical Corps keeps the qualification and selections standards difficult and competitive in the Pakistani military to only ensure that the suitable and qualified intakes in the Special Forces in the Pakistan military as the special forces cannot be mass-produced nor it can arise in the extenuating situations.

Prior to joining the Special Service Group, the interested junior army officers (usually at OF-1 and OF-2) and enlisted personnel must have spent their committed military careers for at least five years and must be volunteered to join the Special Service Group. Once selected through successfully undergoing through the medical evaluation, the interested personnel must report to the Parachute Training School in Peshawar to volunteer for the airborne training, and must get the airborne qualification badge from the airborne training school. The airborne training course held for four weeks where the interested personnel must excelled the HALO/HAHO methods with five-day jumps and three-night military free fall.

After gaining their airborne qualification badge, the army personnel then reports to Cherat from Peshawar– a nominal distance between two cities is approximated between 62.9 kilometres (39.1 mi)– engage through this journey by the foot while wearing their full military gear (30 kilograms). The interested individual must undergoes a 24-week of military training and training process once reported to Cherat.

The training courses in the Special Service Group emphasis strong physical conditioning and mental fitness, including the everyday based surprised strategic thinking quiz and a 36-mile march in 12 hours. Violation of the military code and ethics by the trainee soldier resulted in including the 9.3 kilometres (5.8 mi) march from Cherat to Chapri with full 36 pounds (16 kg) military gear.

The curriculum of the basic military training course included the mastery in Judo and Karateka, special weapons training, military navigation, and handling and disarming of the chemical explosives, survival skill training. There are schools of special warfare that the trainee soldier chooses: Snow and High Altitude School, Mountain Warfare School, Airborne Warfare School, Desert Warfare School, Sniper School, and Frogman School. These schools offers the advanced training courses which runs for additional 25–30 weeks (depending on student's choosing of his career), and only successfully passed out personnel are awarded with badges of their specialized fields by their specialized school faculty. The dropout rates of Special Service Group(Army) is 85 to 90 Percent because of extremely tough training process. Every year, thousands of Applicants apply to join the SSG but at the end, maximum of 100 to 120 cadets get their recommendation letter for Special Service Group. The army personnel interested in the underwater demolition must be trained with their Navy counterparts in Manora Island in the Karachi coast including being qualified to get their long-range swimming qualification badge from the Naval authorities.

The Special Service Group criteria meet special forces training and selection criteria of the United States Army

==== Interaction with other special forces ====
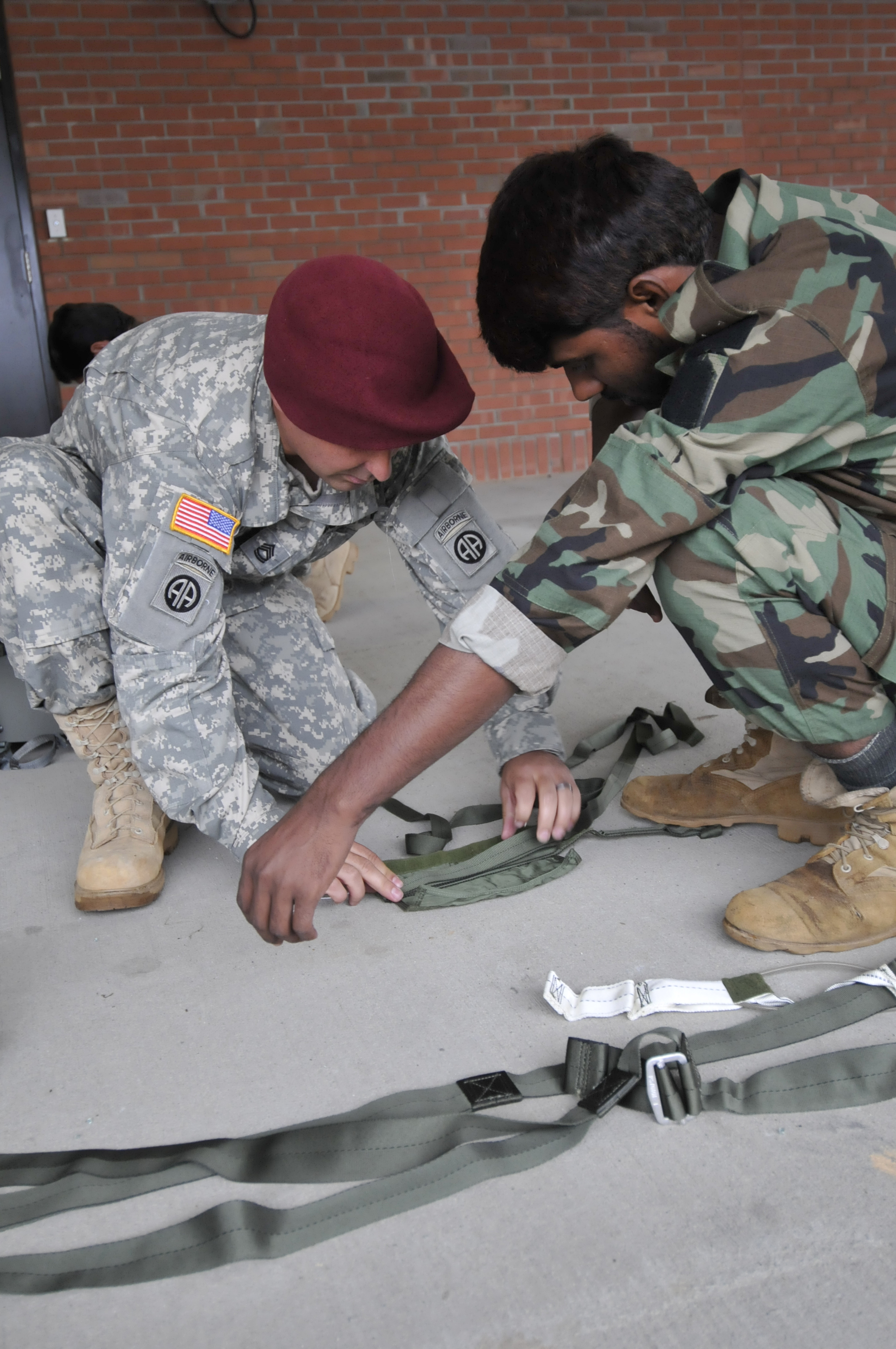
A U.S. Army's airborne specialist interacting with the Army SSG airborne trooper for the airborne mission training in Egypt in 2009.

Since its establishment in 1956, the Army Special Service Group have been regularly interacted and trained together with the United States Army Special Forces–though the Pakistan Army's infantry branch had first participated in Exercise Vulcan and Exercise Handicap in 1954. Besides training and the interaction with the United States Army, Pakistan Army Special Service Group have held joint special warfare training exercises with the Special Air Service (SAS) of the British Army, Special Forces Command of the Turkish Land Forces, Special Operation Forces of the Royal Jordanian Army, the Special Operation Forces of the Chinese People's Liberation Army Ground Forces, and the Spetsnaz of the Russian Ground Forces.

For their overseas deployment for the purpose of the education and training, the Special Service Group have been deployed in Bangladesh, Saudi Arabia, Sri Lanka, Bahrain, Maldives, United Arab Emirates, Turkmenistan, Egypt, Japan, and Iraq where its operatives have overseen the friendly nations special forces programs.

Since 1998, the Army Special Service Group biannually conducts the military exercise with the Turkish Land Forces's Special Forces, which have been designated as the "Jinnah–Atatürk Series." The military exercise held in Pakistan is known as "Atatürk Exercise" while in Turkey, it is known as "Jinnah Exercise." The first of these series of exercise were held in Pakistan, with twenty-one Turkish Land Forces officers and fourteen enlists coming to Pakistan for the exercise– Pakistan reciprocated the visit in 2000. The Jinnah-Atatürk Series are oriented and focused towards the snow, high-altitude, and mountain warfare."

With renewed military relations with the United States Army in the 1990s, the Army Special Service Group conducted several military exercises with the United States Army Special Forces (SF), known as the "Exercise Inspired Venture/Gambit", with first being held in 1993. The Exercise Inspired Venture/Gambit is oriented and directed towards focusing on special weapon familiarization, mountain warfare, night time assaults, air assault techniques in counter-terrorism measures.

Since 2006, the Army Special Service Group also conducts training with the People's Liberation Army Ground Forces Special Operation Forces, which is known as the Pakistan-China Joint Exercise Friendship– this exercise is oriented towards tackling insurgencies and improving methods in counterterrorism. In 2008–09, the Army Special Service Group, together with the United States Army Special Forces, participated in the multinational security exercise, the Operation Bright Star, held in Alexandria in Egypt in 2009 to train with the Thunderbolt Forces of the Egyptian Army.

In 2016, the Army Special Service Group conducted the annual military exercise with the Russian Ground Forces' Spetsnaz–the Russo-Pakistani military exercise is known as Druzhba (lit. Friendship). The Druzhba with Russian Spetsnaz are oriented and focused towards mountain warfare and tactics in counterterrorism in taking out and eliminating the terrorist organizations with first being held in 2016 and the recent being held in 2018.

== Operations ==
=== Counterterrorism operations timeline ===
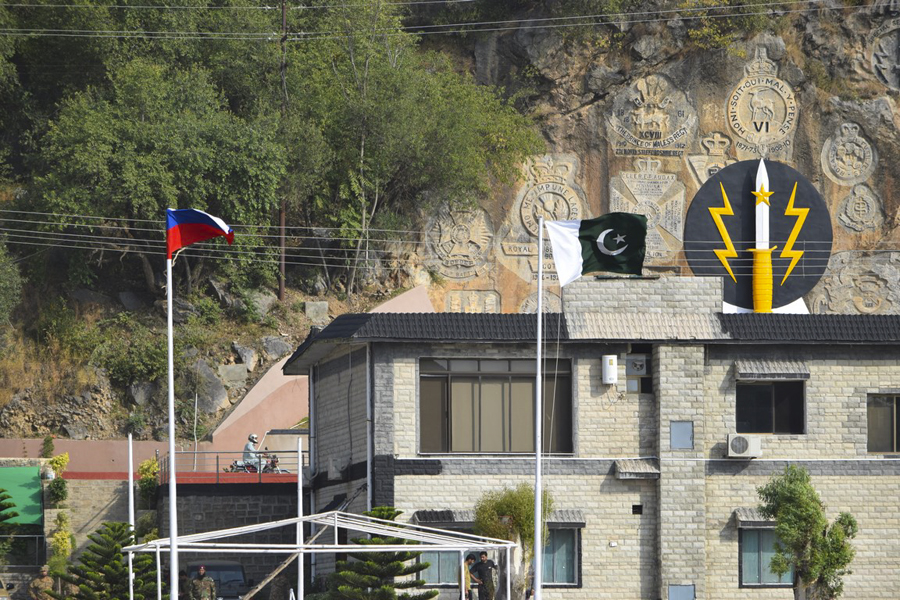
The Special Operation Forces School in Cherat with the Russian Flag waving.

- On 5 September 1986, Pan Am Flight 73 was hijacked by terrorists while it was refueling in Karachi. In the chaos, the pilots had managed to escape causing the hijackers to begin negotiations with the authorities. As negotiations stalled and the terrorists began to kill the passengers forced towards the back of the plane. Plane doors were opened allowing passengers to jump. The SSG was forced storm the plane, killing one hijacker and capturing the rest.
- On 20 February 1994, some terrorists of Afghanistan hijacked a school bus with 74 children and 8 teachers. They drove to the Afghan mission in Islamabad where they released 57 students but kept 16 boys and the teachers. The negotiations led nowhere and it was decided to free the hostages by force. The SSG commandos used a secondary explosion as a distraction and entered the room at the Afghan embassy where the hostages were being held, killing the three hijackers. The operation lasted about 20 seconds.
- On 25 May 1998, three terrorists took over a PIA Fokker plane, Flight 544, who wanted it to fly to Bhuj in Gujrat India. As negotiations dragged, SSG commandos rushed the plane and apprehended all 3 hijackers. None of the passengers were harmed during the assault.
- On Sept 2007, At least 15 soldiers from SSG commando unit were killed and 27 commandos were wounded in a blast, apparently set off by a suicide bomber. The attack took place about 50 miles outside the capital, Islamabad, in the cantonment area of Tarbela Ghazi at the brigade headquarters of the Special Operation Task Force.
- On 10 October 2009, militants attacked the Pakistan Military Headquarters, taking hostage 42 civil and military officials. SSG commandos rescued 39 hostages and killed 4 militants, capturing one. The militants have been linked to Ilyas Kashmiri being a leading Al Qaeda commander operating alongside Tehrik-e-Taliban. A total of six SSG commandos and three hostages were killed in the operation. As reported by ISPR (Inter Services Public Relations) Welcome to ISPR. Three more SSG commandos, injured during the operation, died in the hospital on 12 October.
- On 16 December 2014, SSG Commandos from the Zarrar Company were tasked with clearing an Army Public School which was raided by seven Tahreek-e-Taliban (TTP) terrorists in Peshawar. All the terrorists were eliminated and the school was cleared. Around 149 people, mostly students aged between 12 and 16 were killed by the Terrorists. The school had about 1,000 students, they were able to rescue about 840 people.
- On 24 October 2016, During the 2016 attack on the Quetta Police Training Center, SSG commandos carried out a counterterrorism operation to neutralize the militants who had stormed the hostel and taken cadets hostage. The operation was led by Captain Roohullah Mohmand and Major Asfandyar. Both officers played a key role in clearing the building under heavy fire. Captain Roohullah was killed during the rescue effort, while over 250 cadets were safely recovered and all attackers were eliminated.
- On 12 March 2025, SSG Commandos from the Zarrar Company were tasked with rescuing hostages taken by Balochistan Liberation Army militants who hijacked a train.

== Commanders of SSG ==
Commanders of Special Service Group
Name and Members	Parent Unit	Notes
Lt Col A.O. Mitha	2 Grenadiers & 9/8 Punjab	Later Major General.
Lt Col Aslam Khan	Punjab Regiment	Later Major General
Col Syed Ghaffar Mehdi	15 Punjab Regiment	Assigned the SSG wing which is worn by all officers serving in SSG from 1964.
Brigadier Naseer Chaudhry	Frontier Force Regiment	Later Major General. As GOC 33 Division during 1971 War, he was injured in an airstrike. Killed in a terrorist attack on a mosque in Lahore on 28 May 2010.
Brigadier Sherullah Beg	18 Punjab Regiment	
Brigadier Ghulam Muhammad	12 Baluch	Later Major General
Brigadier Saleem Zia		
Brigadier Hakeem Arshad Qureshi	11 and 26 Frontier Force Regiment	Later Major General
Brigadier Waheed Arshad Gejial	Guides Infantry (2FF)	Later Major General
Brigadier Rafiuddin Ahmad	2 Baluch	Later Major General
Brigadier Tariq Mahmood	2 Baluch	Killed in a parajumping accident in 1989.
Brigadier Mohammad Akram		
Brigadier Mohammad Nazir	Punjab Regiment	
Brigadier Hamid Rabnawaz	Frontier Force Regiment	later Lt Gen
Brigadier Kamal Shaukat	Azad Kashmir Regiment	
Brigadier Ameer Faisal Alvi	26 Cavalry	later first GoC SSG as Major General.
Brigadier Haroon Aslam	Azad Kashmir Regiment	later Lt General. Also GOC SSG as Maj Gen
Major General Ameer Faisal Alvi	26 Cavalry	First General Officer Commanding SSG.
Major General Tahir Mahmud	Punjab Regiment	Later Lt. Gen.
Major General Haroon Aslam	Azad Kashmir Regiment	Later Lt. Gen.
Major General Farrukh Bashir		
Major General Abid Rafiq		
Major General Tahir Masood Bhutta	54 Punjab Regiment	
Major General Mumtaz Hussain	Punjab Regiment	
Major General Adil Rehmani	Frontier Force Regiment	
Major General Ahmad Jawad	28 Baloch Regiment/ Special Services	

== Notable members ==
Notable members of the Army Special Service Group
Name and Members	Portrait	Notes Rank	Notes on Credentials
General Pervez Musharraf		General	The President of Pakistan (2001–2008), the Chairman of the Joint Chiefs of Staff Committee (1998–2001), the Chief of Army Staff (1998–2007).
Abu Taher		Lieutenant Colonel	Awarded with Black Cat Recognition by the US Army Ranger School in 1966, Awarded with Maroon Parachute Award by the US Army Ranger School, Awarded with Bir Uttam : the second highest gallantry award of Bangladesh Liberation War, Sector Commander of Bangladesh Liberation War, the Co-Chairman of the Socialist Party of Bangladesh
Mirza Aslam Beg		General	The Chief of Army Staff (1988–91).
Tariq Mehmood		Brigadier	Headed the Brigade Combat Team specialized in Airborne missions.
Haroon Islam		Lieutenant-Colonel	Commanding officer of the Operation Silence and lead a counterterrorism team.
Shamim Allam		General	The Chairman of Joint Chiefs of Staff Committee (1991–1994)
A. F. Alvi		Major-General	First GOC of the Army Special Service Group.
Julian Moazzam James		Major-General	First Christian SSG Commando to obtain rank of Major General

== Appearance and equipment ==
=== Uniforms and insignia ===
In the 1970s, the Army Special Service Group Battle Dress Uniform (BDU) was standard Khaki but this was changed to British-styled DPM. In the 1990s, the Battle Dress Uniform was changed in favor of adopting the U.S. woodland (or M81) with a maroon berets, a common colour for the airborne forces, with a silver metal tab on a light blue felt square with a dagger and lightning bolts, and a wing on the right side of the chest.

In 2022, the SSG adopted a new camouflage uniform based on the British Multi Terrain Pattern (MTP), fully replacing the previously used U.S. woodland (M81) camouflage. The uniform introduced a modern camouflage pattern designed for use across a range of terrain and environmental conditions. It also incorporated a contemporary cut and configuration, providing greater compatibility with modern load-bearing equipment and other operational gear.

The counterterrorism teams, on the other hand, include camouflage and black dungarees (for the CT team).

=== Equipment ===
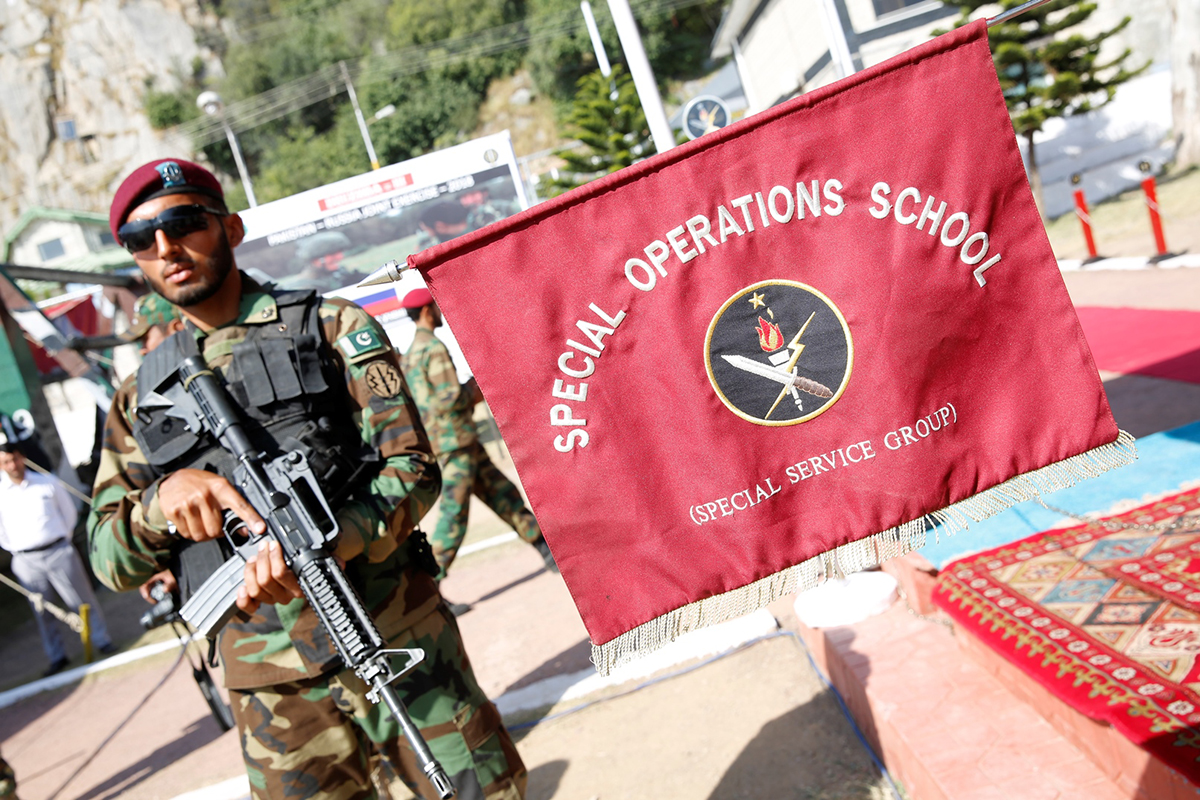
SSG troop with an M4 carbine.

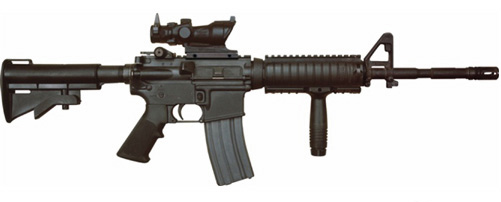
The U.S.-built M4 carbine rifle— This is the standard issue rifle for the Army Special Service Group.

Pistols

- Germany SIG Sauer P226/P229
- Germany Heckler & Koch USP
- Austria Glock 17/19
- Pakistan POF Eye

Submachine guns

- Germany Heckler & Koch MP5
- Belgium FN P90

Assault rifles

- USA M4A1 Carbine
- Austria Steyr AUG
- Switzerland SIG SG 550

Sniper rifles

- Pakistan PSR-90
- Austria Steyr SSG 69
- UK Accuracy International Arctic Warfare
- USA Barrett M82
- UK RPA Rangemaster .50
- Germany Heckler & Koch G28

Heavy Armament

- USA M249
- Russia RPG-7
- USA SMAW
- Germany MILAN ATGM
- Pakistan Anza MANPADS
- Source: Army Special Service Group's Weapon System by Military Factor. Inside Pakistan's Sharp Sword - The Special Service Group (SSG) by Pakistan's Premier Military Defence Forum.

== Influence on the Inter-services branches ==
Special Operations Forces of Pakistan

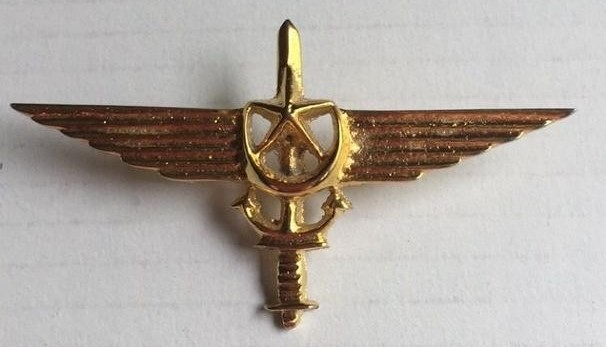
Badge of the Special Service Group (Navy)

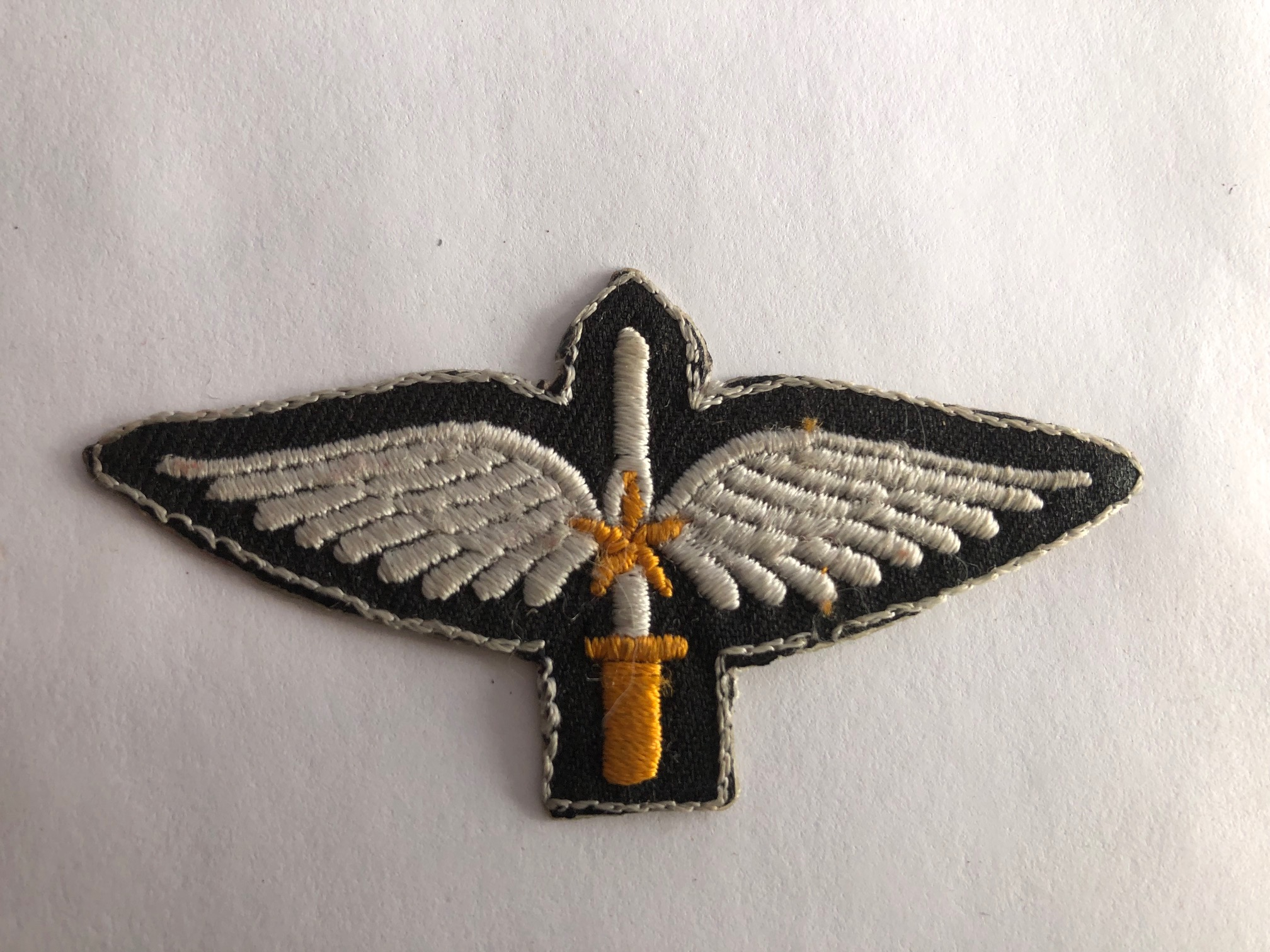
Badge of the Special Services Wing

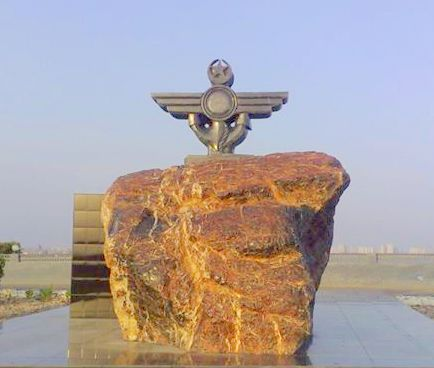
Badge of the Pakistan Marines

After the Indo-Pakistani war of 1965, the Army Special Service Group had established its personnel physical fitness leading the Pakistan Navy to recognize the need of the special operation force but it had little experience and tradition in the military scuba diving as well as had little understanding towards the nature of the seaborne special operations. In 1966, the Army Special Service Group helped raise the military diving division within the Navy from its frogman team— the Musa Company that remains to be part the Army Special Service Group for inland riverine operations.

Introduction and instructions on combat scuba diving and basic training were provided by the personnel from the Musa Company before the Navy Special Service Group moved towards getting trained with the U.S. Navy's United States Navy SEALs. Over the several years, the Navy was dependent on the Army to provide training to their Navy SEAL Teams in the Navy Special Service Group on education and training on the combat parachuting, sniper marksmanship, counterterrorism, and counterinsurgency.

Eventually, the Navy established their own schools on combat parachuting, sniping, counterterrorism, and the counterinsurgency but these schools are influenced and modeled after the Army's Special Service Group training methods whose instructors are the alumnus of the Army schools of special operation forces who tightly followed the army's philosophy, physical standards, and education.

The personnel of the Navy SEAL Teams in the Navy Special Service Group adopted to wear the Army Special Service Group U.S. Woodland (M81) Battle Dress Uniform (BDU) with the distinction of the dark blue beret with three versions of the "fouled anchor" with a navy badge (as shown in the footage) and a metal SSGN qualification badge featuring a vertical dagger superimposed over a midget submarine is worn over the left pocket on dress uniforms; parachute wings are worn over the right pocket.

In 1965, the Pakistan Air Force had a special operation force established: the Special Service Wing under Air Commodore Mukhtar Ahmad Dogar but it was decommissioned in 1972 whose personnel went to join the Army Special Service Group. In 2003, the Pakistan Air Force recommissioned the Special Service Wing and their headgear is distinguished by maroon berets with the airmen wears insignia on the beret, and a wing on the right side of the chest. The combat uniform of SSW is olive drab camouflage. They also wear their special service wing insignia on the left shoulder "Winged Dragons and lightning bolts".

== Distinction from Other Special Operations Formations ==
The Special Service Group (SSG) is distinct from other Pakistani special operations formations, including the Special Service Group Navy (SSGN) and the Special Service Wing (SSW) of the Pakistan Air Force. The SSG is a formation of the Pakistan Army, whereas the SSGN and SSW belong to the Pakistan Navy and Pakistan Air Force, respectively, and have separate organizational structures, roles, and areas of specialization. Despite sharing similar training and operational capabilities, the three formations operate under their respective military services.

=== Difference in Appearance ===
==== SSG ====
The SSG currently uses a camouflage combat uniform based on the British Multi Terrain Pattern (MTP) with a silver metal tab on a light blue felt square with a dagger and lightning bolts and a wing on the right side of the chest.

==== SSGN ====
The Special Service Group (Navy) (SSN), is distinguished by a dark blue beret with three versions of the "fouled anchor" navy badge for officers, NCOs and enlisted men. A metal SSGN qualification badge featuring a vertical dagger superimposed over a midget submarine is worn over the left pocket on dress uniforms. Parachute wings are worn over the right pocket.

==== SSW ====
The Special Services Wing (SSW), is distinguished by maroon berets with PAF Officer, JCO or Airmen insignia on the beret, and a wing on the right side of the chest. The combat uniform of SSW is olive drab camouflage. They also wear their special service wing insignia on the left shoulder "Winged Dragons and lightning bolts".

== In popular culture ==
Books, television series, movies and video games

- 1996: Aahan, a popular television series produced by ISPR and on-aired by PTV. The main character, played by poet Wasi Shah, who also wrote the screenplay, and his coursemates go through physical challenges and fitness required for becoming the Maroon Beret.
- 1998: Alpha Bravo Charlie, a popular television series produced by ISPR and on-aired by PTV.
- 2003: Unlikely Beginnings: A Soldier's Life, a book by A O Mitha.
- 2006: In the Line of Fire: A Memoir, a book by Pervez Musharraf.
- 2008: Crossed Swords: Pakistan, Its Army, and the Wars Within, a book by Shuja Nawaz.
- 2013: Waar, the main character Major Mujtaba Rizvi (played by Shaan Shahid) is a SSG soldier and Kargil war veteran.
- 2014: Retribution, the video game featuring sniping and special operations.
- 2017: Yalghaar, the war film based on the Special Service Group's 4th Command Battalion (Yalghaar)'s covert operations.

== See also ==
- Special Service Group (Navy) — Pakistan Navy
- Special Services Wing — Pakistan Air Force
- Pakistan Marines — Pakistan Navy
