= Ghazi Airbase =

Pakistan Army Aviation air base in Tarbela, Khyber Pakhtunkhwa

Coordinates: 33°59′04″N 072°36′33″E

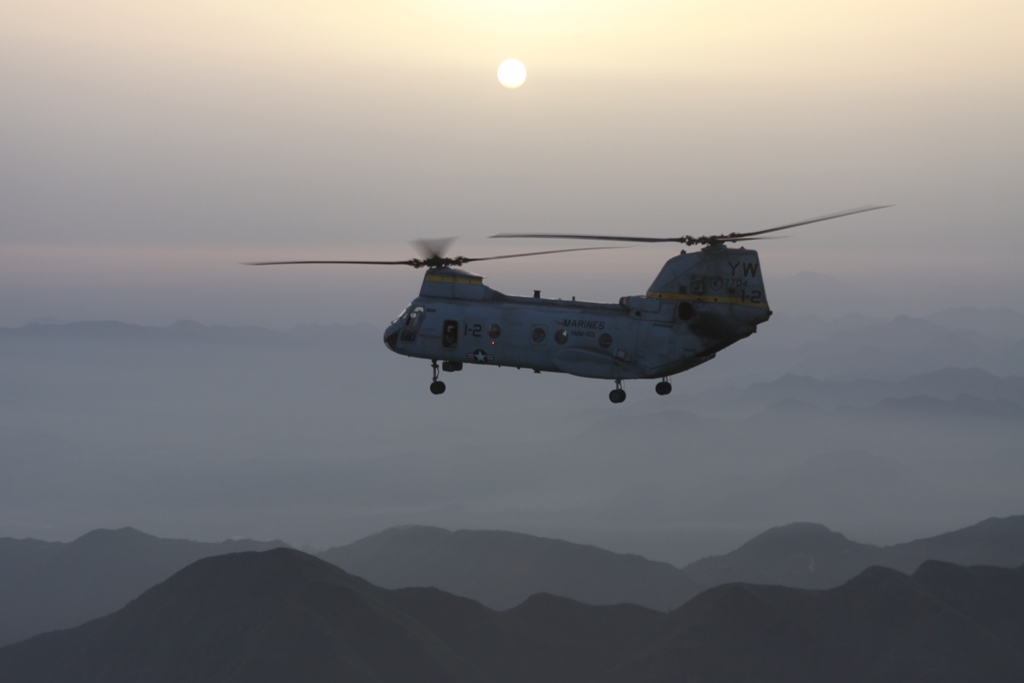
A U.S. Marine Corps CH-46 Sea Knight helicopter flies over the mountains of Kohistan, en route to Ghazi Aviation Base, Pakistan

Ghazi Airbase or Ghazi Aviation Base is a Pakistan Army Aviation air base located in Tarbela, Haripur District of Khyber Pakhtunkhwa, Pakistan. It serves as the headquarters of the Special Service Group (SSG), the special forces of the Pakistan Army. The airbase also sees civilian use.
