= Roohullah Mohmand =

Pakistani military person

- Captain Roohullah Mohmand, Tamgha-e-Jurat
- Born: 5 May 1989; Peshawar, Khyber Pakhtunkhwa, Pakistan
- Died: 24 October 2016 (aged 27); Quetta, Balochistan, Pakistan
- Military career
- Allegiance: Pakistan
- Branch: Pakistan Army
- Service years: 2012–2016
- Rank: Captain
- Units: Light Commando Battalion, Special Service Group
- Conflicts: 2016 Quetta police training college attack
- Awards: Tamgha-e-Jurat (posthumous)

Roohullah Mohmand (5 May 1989 – 24 October 2016) was a Pakistani military officer who served as a commando in the Special Service Group (SSG) of the Pakistan Army. He was killed on 24 October 2016 during a clearance operation at the Balochistan Police Training College attack in Quetta, after throwing himself onto a concealed suicide bomber to shield police recruits from the blast. He was posthumously awarded the Tamgha-e-Jurat, Pakistan's fourth-highest military honour.

== Early life and education ==
Roohullah Mohmand was born on 5 May 1989 in Peshawar, Khyber Pakhtunkhwa. He was the eldest of four siblings, three brothers and one sister, and grew up in the Muradabad area of the city. His father, Dr Habibullah Mohmand, had hoped he would pursue a medical career, but Roohullah chose instead to join the armed forces.

He completed his matriculation with distinction from Islamia Collegiate School in 2007 and his FSc from Government College Hayatabad in 2009.

== Military career ==
Roohullah was commissioned into the Pakistan Army in 2012 following graduation from the Pakistan Military Academy (PMA), Kakul. He was initially posted to the 50th Baloch Regiment before volunteering for the Special Service Group, where he served in the Light Commando Battalion.

Prior to October 2016, he participated in several counter-terrorism operations, including the response to the 2014 Peshawar school massacre, the 2015 Camp Badaber attack, the Bacha Khan University attack in January 2016, and operations at the Christian Colony in Warsak. He was transferred to Balochistan on 28 September 2016, approximately one month before his death.

== Death ==
On the night of 24 October 2016, three heavily armed militants stormed the Balochistan Police Training College on the outskirts of Quetta, killing 61 cadets and wounding more than 165 others. The Islamic State – Khorasan Province subsequently claimed responsibility for the attack; Pakistan-based Lashkar-e-Jhangvi claimed to have participated alongside them.

Captain Roohullah led an SSG team conducting a clearance operation inside the college buildings to rescue trapped cadets. While searching a darkened dormitory, he encountered a group of recruits sheltering under charpoys. He identified himself as an SSG soldier and ordered the cadets to raise their hands and leave the room. One person remained hidden. Roohullah moved across the room, kicked over the charpoy, and exposed a suicide bomber concealed beneath it. He immediately threw himself onto the attacker, who detonated his explosive vest moments later.

The blast killed Roohullah. Surviving recruits credited his actions with preventing further casualties among the cadets present in the room. At the time of his death, he was serving as an anti-terrorism platoon commander and was reported to be engaged to be married, with the wedding planned for January 2017.

== Awards ==
Following his death, the Chief of Army Staff, General Raheel Sharif, nominated Roohullah for the posthumous award of the Tamgha-e-Jurat in recognition of his conduct during the attack.
