= Julian Moazzam James =

Pakistan Army general

Julian Muazzam James TBt
- Born: Kohat, KPK
- Alma mater: Pakistan Military Academy
- Children: Kawish Julian Akash Julian Salman Julian
- Military career
- Allegiance: Pakistan
- Branch: Pakistan Army
- Service years: 1995 — present
- Rank: Major General
- Units: 136 RCG Air Defence; 3 Cdo Bn SSG
- Commands: GOC of 3 Air Defence Division; Brigade Commander of SSG Brigade Tarbela; Brigade Commander of Air Defence Brigade, Sargodha; Defence attaché to Nigeria
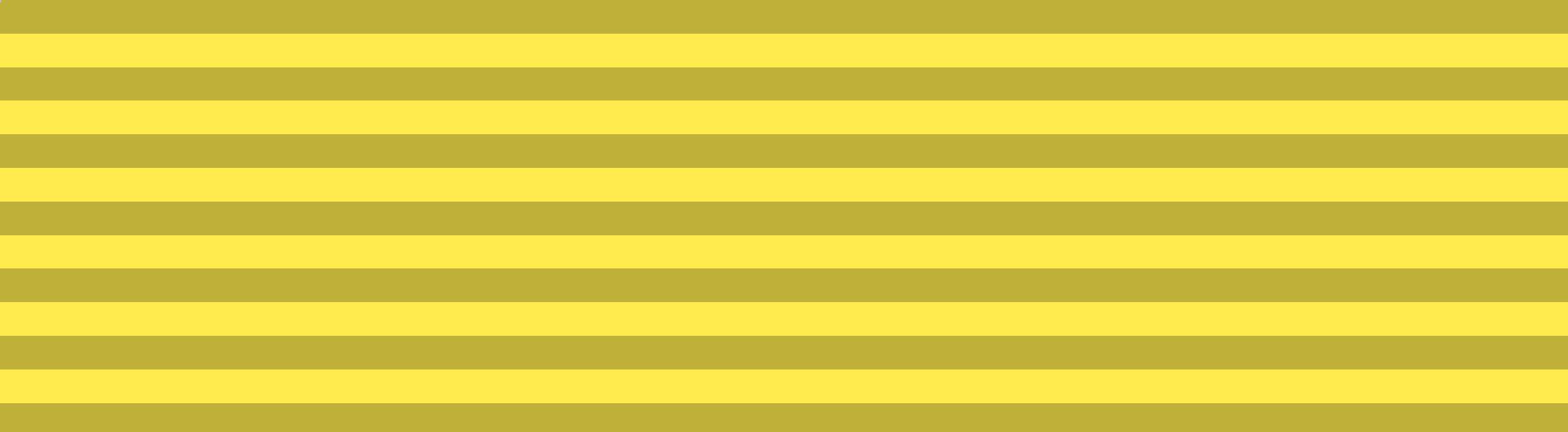
- Awards: Tamgha-i-Basalat Golden Wound Strip of the Pakistan Armed Forces

Julian Muazzam James is a two star general in the Pakistan Army who is the incumbent General Officer Commanding of 3 Air Defence Division. He is the first Christian SSG Commando to attain the rank.

== Early life ==
Julian Moazzam James was born in Kohat Pakistan and was commissioned in 92 PMA Long Course.

== Military Career ==
He served in the elite Special Services Group (SSG),becoming the first Christian to reach two star rank from this unit. He commanded the SSG Brigade in Tarbela and Air Defence Brigade in Sargodha.

He also served as the Defence Attaché to Nigeria and is a graduate of Command and Staff College from National Defence University.

In 2023 he led the Pakistani Military Delegation to India for SCO Defence Ministers meeting.

He was promoted to the rank of Major General in 2024,becoming the first Christian General from SSG and the third in Pakistan Army.
