= Tariq Mehmood =

Pakistani military officer

- Born: Tariq Mehmood; 8 October 1938; Multan, Punjab, British India
- Died: 29 May 1989 (aged 50); Rahwali near Gujranwala, Punjab, Pakistan
- Alma mater: Pakistan Military Academy
- Military career
- Allegiance: Pakistan
- Branch: Pakistan Army
- Service years: 1960–1989
- Rank: Brigadier
- Nicknames: Man of Steel; TM Tiger
- Units: 50th Airborne Division, PA; Special Service Group
- Commands: 3rd Commando Powinda Battalion; Shaheen Company, 1st commando battalion Special Service Group; 50th Airborne Division
- Conflicts: Operation PANAM; Indo-Pakistani War of 1965; Operation Gibraltar; Indo-Pakistani War of 1971; East Pakistan Air Operations, 1971; Siachen Operations of 1984; Soviet–Afghan War; Battle for Hill 3234
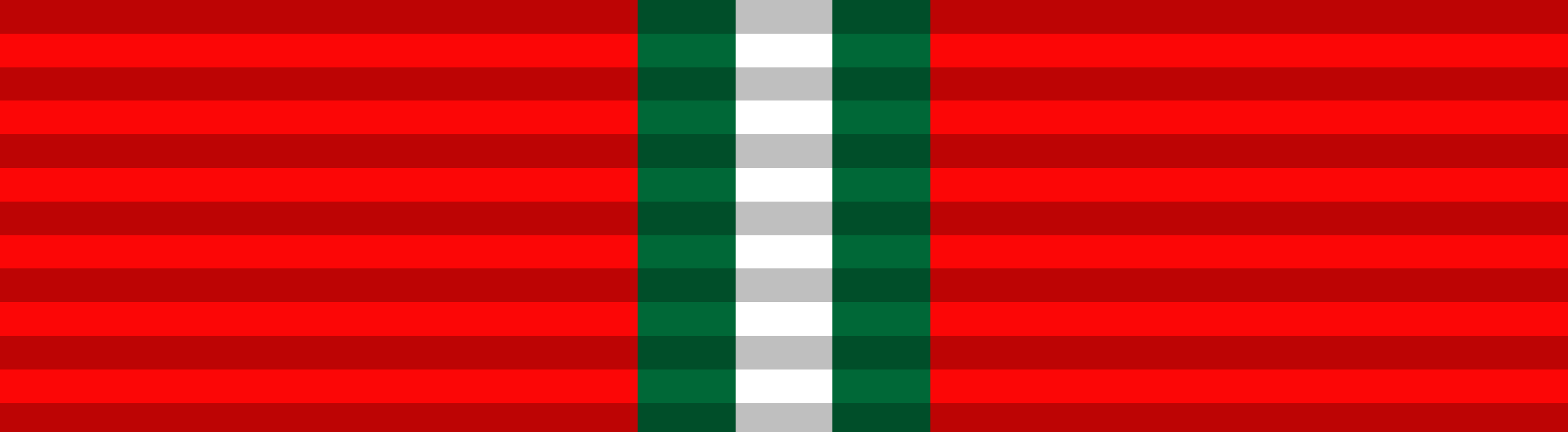
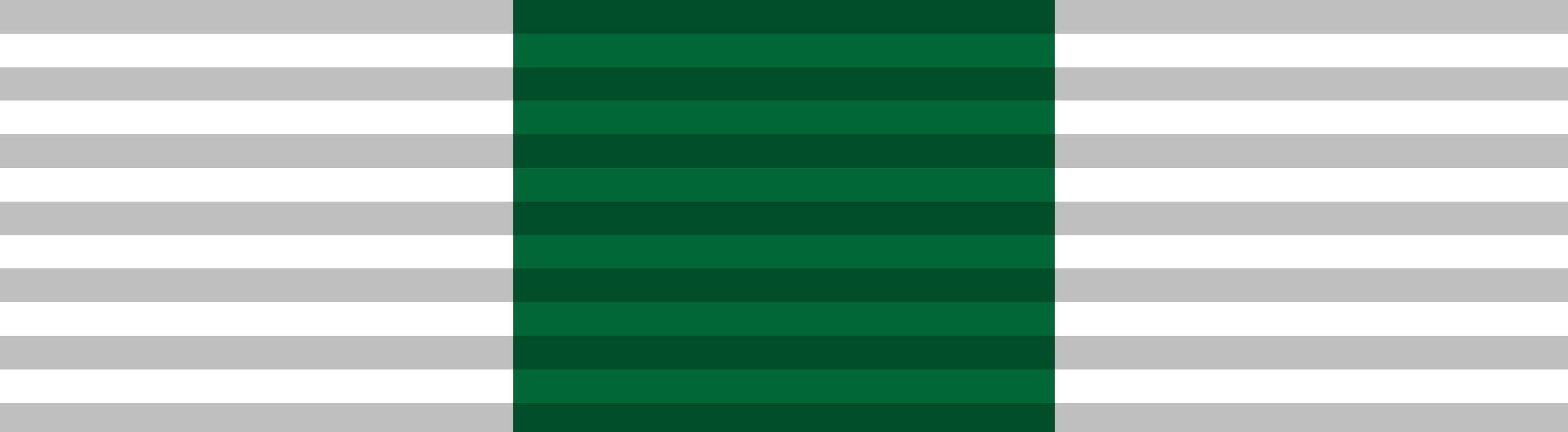
- Awards: Hilal-e-Shujaat Sitara-e-Jurat & BAR Sitara-e-Basalat

Tariq Mehmood (8 October 1938 – 29 May 1989) was a Pakistani military officer of the Pakistan Army. He was serving as the Commander of Pakistan Army's Special Service Group (SSG), when he died in an accident in 1989 due to malfunctioning of his parachute during a free fall display at Rahwali, near Gujranwala.

== Early life and education ==
Mehmood was born on 8 October 1938 at Multan. His father was a senior police officer. After completing his intermediate education from Gordon Christian College, Rawalpindi in 1956, he went to Lahore and graduated from Government College in 1959. He was also a member of Government College cricket team captained by Javed Burki. After graduation he went to Peshawar to study law at University of Peshawar, but he also got selected for Pakistan Army at the same time. He made a choice to serve his country and joined Pakistan Military Academy as a cadet in 1960. He graduated from PMA in 1963 with a double BSc in Military science and War studies. He also attended Command and Staff College, Quetta, and completed his Staff Course in 1969.

== Military career ==
Mahmood was commissioned in 2nd Battalion of The Baloch Regiment in 1960, passing out from PMA in 1963. The same year, he was inducted in 51st Paratrooper Division, Airborne Corps, and from there, he was selected for the Special Service Group (SSG). After completing the Special Training of SSG he was posted to the 1st Commando Battalion (Yaldram)(Shaheen Company).

Throughout the 1980s, the SSG and ISI were collaborating with American intelligence to lead Operation Cyclone. On 5 September 1986, Pan Am Flight 73 was hijacked in Karachi, Sindh. He came to public prominence after having led the successful Operation PANAM to liberate the airline from terrorists. The hijackers opened fire on the SSG team, killing and injuring the passengers but soon all the hijackers were arrested and many lives were saved. Later, in 1987–88, he led operations against criminals in Sindh.

== Death and legacy ==
Brigadier TM died on 29 May 1989 when he led a team of SSG paratroopers for a free-fall at Pakistan Army Aviation School, Rahwali, Gujranwala. The jump was part of Army Aviation's Passing Out parade.

== Awards and decorations ==
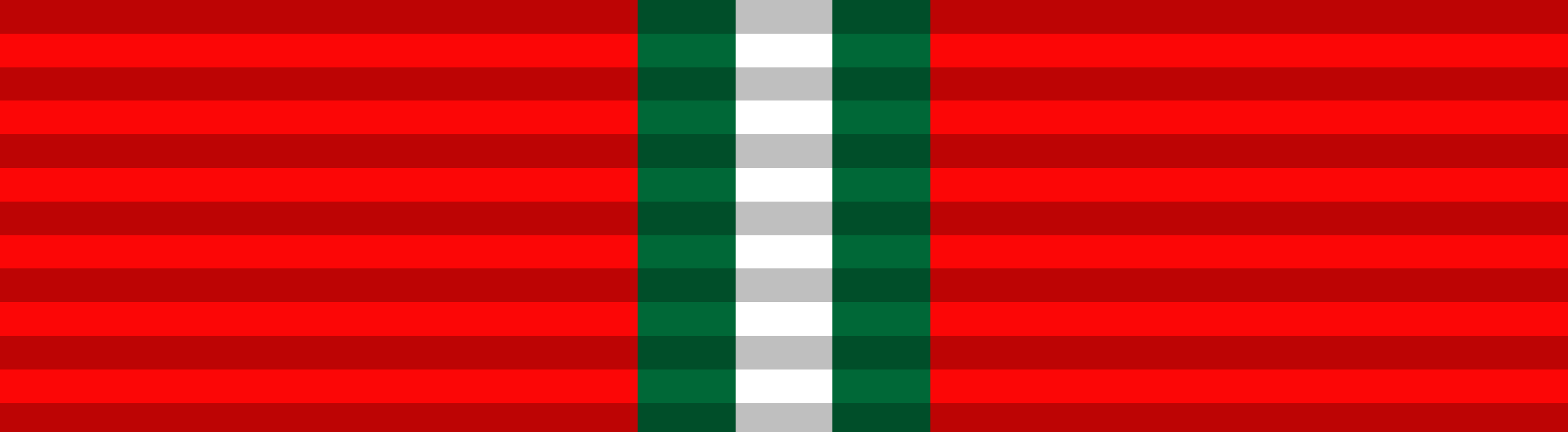

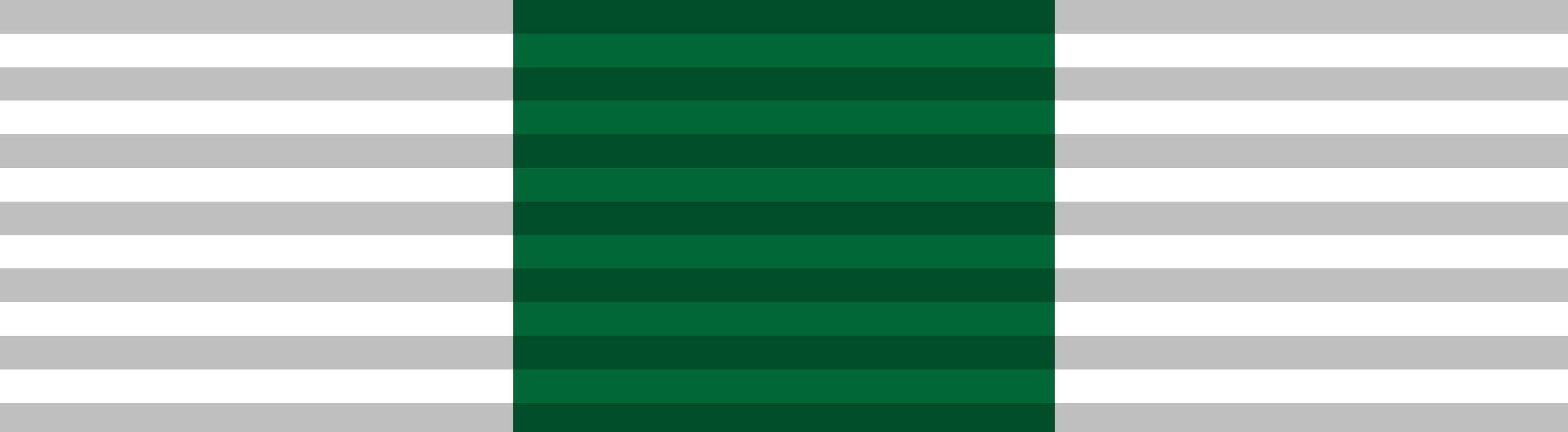

	Hilal-e-Shujaat (Crescent of Bravery) POSTHUMOUS	Sitara-e-Jurat & Bar (Star of Courage): 1. 1965 War; 2. 1971 War	
Sitara-e-Basalat (Star of Good Conduct) 1977	Tamgha-e-Diffa (General Service Medal) Siachen Glacier Clasp	Sitara-e-Harb 1965 War (War Star 1965)	Sitara-e-Harb 1971 War (War Star 1971)
Tamgha-e-Jang 1965 War (War Medal 1965)	Tamgha-e-Jang 1971 War (War Medal 1971)	Tamgha-e-Sad Saala Jashan-e- Wiladat-e-Quaid-e-Azam (100th Birth Anniversary of Muhammad Ali Jinnah) 1976	Hijri Tamgha (Hijri Medal) 1979
