= Covert Action Division =

Special operations force of Inter-Services Intelligence (ISI) agency

- Urdu: خفیہ ایکشن ڈویژن; Persian: بخش اقدام مخفی; Arabic: قسم العمليات السرية
- Active: 1948–present
- Country: Pakistan
- Type: Black ops, special forces, paramilitary
- Size: Classified
- Part of: Inter-Service Intelligence
- Headquarters: Islamabad, Pakistan
- Known operations: Waziristan rebellion (1948–1954); Afghan conflict; 1975 Panjshir Valley uprising; Soviet–Afghan War; Afghan Civil War (1989–1992); Afghan Civil War (1992–1996); Afghan Civil War (1996–2001); War in Afghanistan (2001–2021); Yugoslav wars; Bosnian war; Indo-Pakistani wars and conflicts; Indo-Pakistani war of 1965; Bangladesh Liberation War; Third Indo-Pakistani War; Kashmir conflict; Insurgency in Kashmir; Terrorism in Pakistan; Insurgency in Khyber Pakhtunkhwa; Insurgency in Balochistan; Iraqi conflict; War in Iraq (2013–2017)

Commanders
- Current commander: DG-ISI Lt. Gen. Asim Malik

Insignia
- Symbol of Identification: None

The Covert Action Division (CAD) is the black ops unit of the Inter-Services Intelligence. It is responsible for paramilitary and covert operations. It is tasked to collect intelligence and conduct covert operations in hostile environments and war-zones. It is similar in its function and structure to the CIA Special Activities Center.

== History and formation ==
After the formation of ISI in 1948, Pakistan faced challenges in the Tribal Agencies of Waziristan caused by the Faqir of Ipi. In response, a group of die-hard persons from the Pakistan Army and the Gilgit scouts were trained. They had formed the new directorate of ISI. Their main task was to counter the influence of Faqir of Ipi and to delay any Afghan incursion until the main force of the Pakistan Army arrives.

== Operations ==
Until November 1954, the CAD was mostly aimed to counter insurgency in Waziristan but after that, its role was slowly expanded outside Waziristan, and a new unit was raised in East Pakistan to conduct counterinsurgency and counter-terrorism operations against the Indian-backed Mukti Bahini. Its role was expanded in the late 1980s to assist the Afghan mujahideen.

During the 1960s, the unit received training from the CIA and again received training in the 1980s to assist the Afghan Mujahideen during the Soviet invasion. The unit is believed to have been involved in orchestrating the 1975 Panjshir Valley uprising, which was the ISI's first ever successful operation in Afghanistan. The unit also took part in many battles against Soviets, including direct raids into the Soviet Union.

When the Indian Army's conducted an expedition to take control of the Siachen Glacier from Pakistan, the ISI's Covert Action Division (CAD) inserted in the region, confirming the intrusion and movement of Indian Army soldiers in 1983.

As part of its operations in Bosnia, the Inter-Services Intelligence, through its Covert Action Division, secretly supplied the Bosnian mujahideen with arms, ammunition, and guided anti-tank missiles to give them a chance against Serb forces, during the Bosnian War (1992–1995). General Javed Nasir later claimed that the ISI had airlifted anti-tank guided missiles to Bosnia, which ultimately turned the tide in favor of the Bosniaks and forced the Serbs to lift the siege of Sarajevo.

The ISI and its CAD (along the Pakistan Army's SSG), provided both intelligence and training to Iraqi forces during the War in Iraq (2013–2017).

Little is known about the unit as it is one of the most classified elements of the ISI, working with a limited number of senior officers.

Since 1990s, there had been allegations that CAD teams were involved in recruiting and training Kashmiri fighters (rebels and mujahideen) from both Indian Kashmir and Pakistani Kashmir to operate in India.

== Training ==
CAD operatives are trained in home developed tactics. They are also trained to a high level of proficiency in the tactical employment of an unusually wide degree of modern weaponry, improvised explosive devices, irregular warfare tactics, explosive devices and firearms (foreign and domestic), hand-to-hand combat, high performance/tactical driving (on and off-road), apprehension avoidance (including picking handcuffs and escaping from confinement), cyber warfare, covert channels, high-altitude military parachuting, SCUBA diving and amphibious operations, proficiency in foreign languages, surreptitious entry operations (picking or otherwise bypassing locks), vehicle hot-wiring, Survival and Escape, extreme survival and wilderness training, combat EMS medical training, tactical communications, and tracking.

As fully trained intelligence case officers, paramilitary operations officers possess all the clandestine skills to collect human intelligence–and most importantly–to recruit assets from among the indigenous troops receiving their training. These officers often operate in remote locations behind enemy lines to carry out direct action (including raids and sabotage), counter-intelligence, guerrilla/unconventional warfare, counter-terrorism, and hostage rescue missions, in addition to being able to conduct espionage via Human intelligence assets. As such, paramilitary operations officers are trained to operate in a multitude of environments.

== Recruitment ==
Recruits of the CAD are typically either serving, or retired members of Pakistan Army's Special Service Group, Pakistan Navy's Special Service Group-(Navy), and Pakistan Air Force's Special Services Wing. This is also very similar to the CIA's Special Activities Centre's way of recruiting operatives from existing tier one special operators from the Delta Force or Navy SEALs.

== See also ==
- Ground Branch
- Special Group (India)
- Quds Force:
  - Unit 190
  - Unit 340
  - Unit 400
  - Unit 700
  - Unit 840
  - Unit 2250
  - Unit 18000
- Hezbollah:
