= Special Services Wing =

Special Services Wing (SSW)
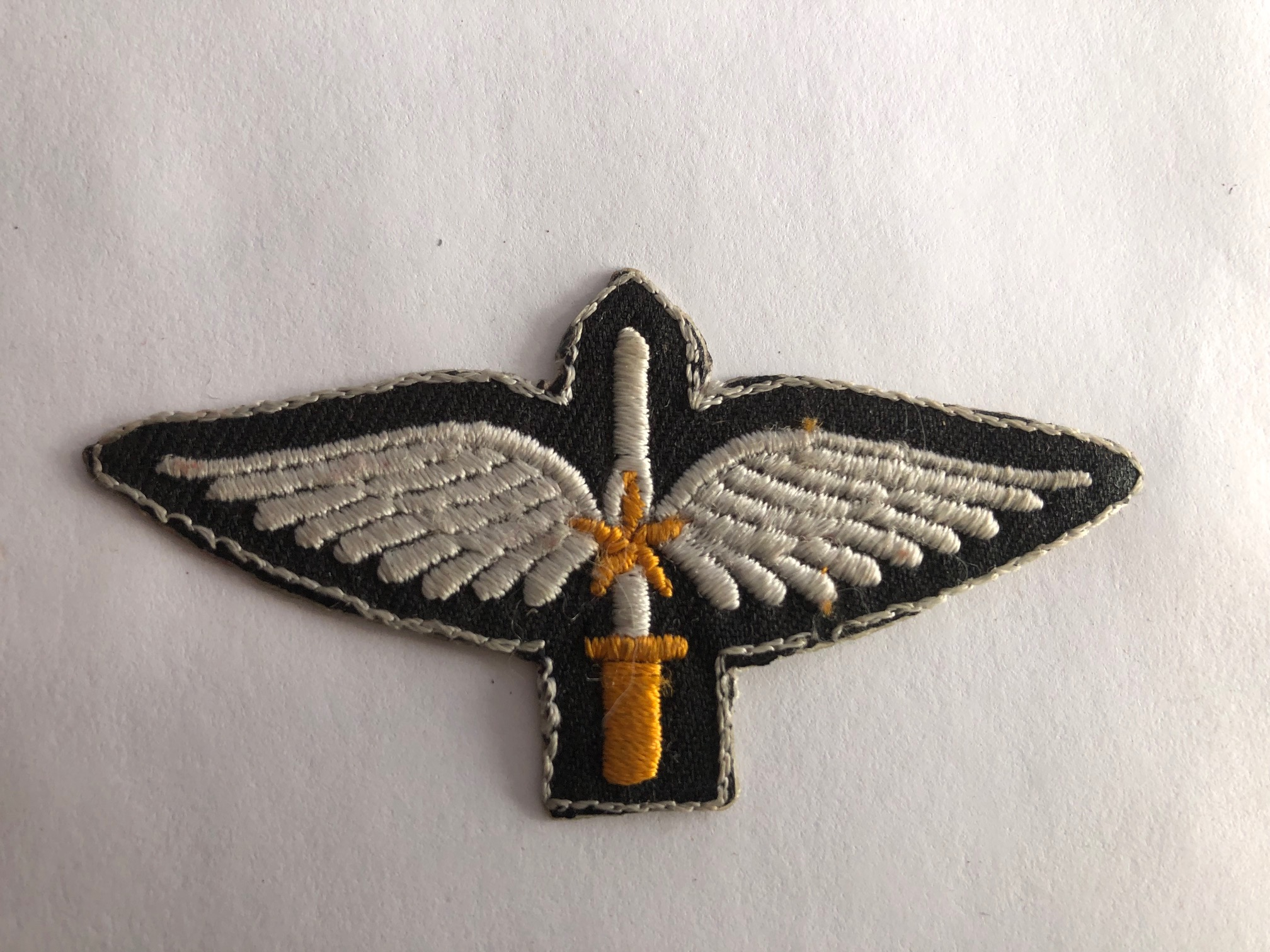
- The Special Warfare Insignia/Badge of PAF
- Active: 2004—present
- Country: Pakistan
- Branch: Pakistan Air Force
- Type: Special operations force, Airborne forces, Paratroopers
- Role: Special operations; Special Reconnaissance; Counter-terrorism; Airlifting; Airdroping; Air assault; Strategic Airlift
- Part of: Air Force Strategic Command
- Garrison/HQ: Kallar Kahar, Punjab
- Mottos: 'Faith, Piety, to strive in the path of Allah', 'Thunder and lightning is a message of death for you '

Commanders
- Current commander: Air-Commodore Sohail Imran Cheema
- Abbreviation: SSW

The Pakistan Air Force Special Services Wing is a special operations force who specialized in all aspects of air-to-ground communication, including airborne special operations, air traffic control, fire support, command, control and communications in covert counterterrorism or austere environments.

They are often assigned individually or as a team to Army Special Service Group, Navy Special Service Group and special tactics units of the Pakistan Marines, to provide expert airfield seizure, airstrike control and communications capabilities.

== History ==
After the 1965 war with India, Air Cdre Mukhtar Ahmad Dogar (SJ), who had flown Royal Indian Air Force aircraft supporting the Chindits Operating behind Japanese lines in Burma, was instrumental in creating a special forces unit for the Pakistan Air Force called SAW (Special Air Warfare Wing). The SAW was raised in 1966 under the command of Sqn Ldr Altaf Hussain Butt (GDP) as C.O of the unit. These Men were picked up directly from RTS (Recruit Training School) in January 1966. The unit was directly under the Directorate of Air Intl (DAI). In 1971, Upon request from PIA (Pakistan international Airlines), members of SAW Unit were given to SKY MARSHALS to perform Flight Protection Services on all domestic and international flights till the end of 1973. When it was decided to convert the unit roll from Offensive to Defensive.

In 1999, the concept of a special forces wing for the Air Force was again revived after the Kargil War with India. Senior officials and military scientists of the Pakistani Armed Forces were impressed in the way that United States Army Special Forces during the initial phase of the war in Afghanistan were able to secure targets, set up runways and airstrips for immediate use and direct strategic and tactical air strikes on enemy positions so quickly. The Air Force established the division under the name Special Service Wing (SSW). One of the combat brigades of Special Service Wing had been carrying out special day-light aerial and night-aerial operations during the recent insurgencies inside Pakistan. The unit, alongside Navy's SSGN and Army's SSG, has actively participated in operations, led by the Pakistan Army, in Waziristan.

== Training ==
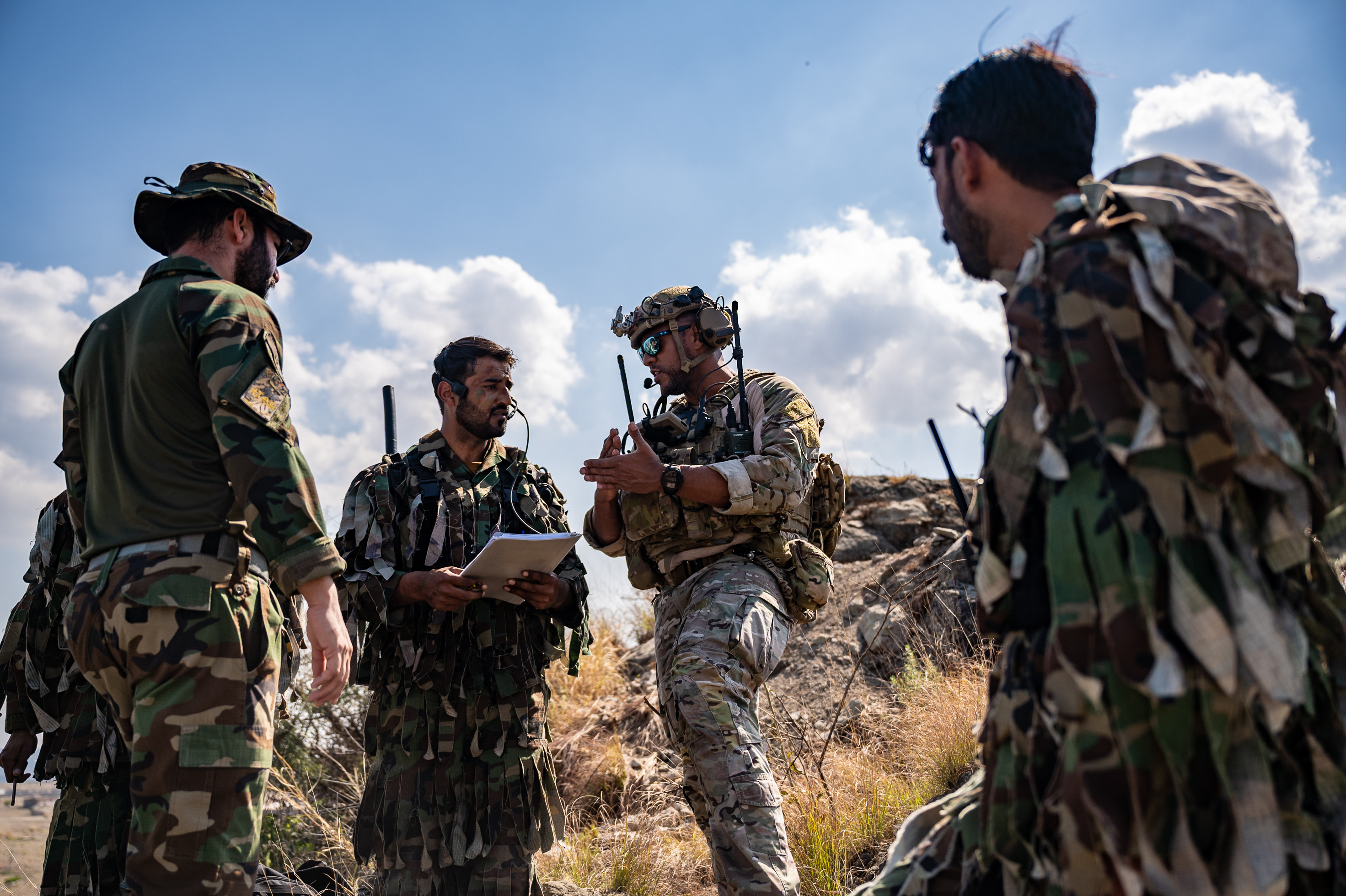
USAF Special Forces Operative briefing SSW Commandos during Falcon Talon 2022

All SSW members get their initial training from the Army's Special Operation School, Cherat. Soldiers wanting to join the SSW must have at least two years of service before they can join.

First, they are given basic training at Pakistan Air Force Ground Combat School Kallar Kahar for a 6–8 weeks. The initial course emphasizes tough physical conditioning and endurance. This includes a 40-mile march in 12 hours with 20 kg weight and a 5-mile run in 35 minutes with full gear (60-80 lbs) among the many physically demanding challenges. The concept of the initial training is designed to weed out the weak candidates. The drop out rate is very high; those who survive the initial training are then sent to Army Special Operation School for 9-12 Months for specialized training.

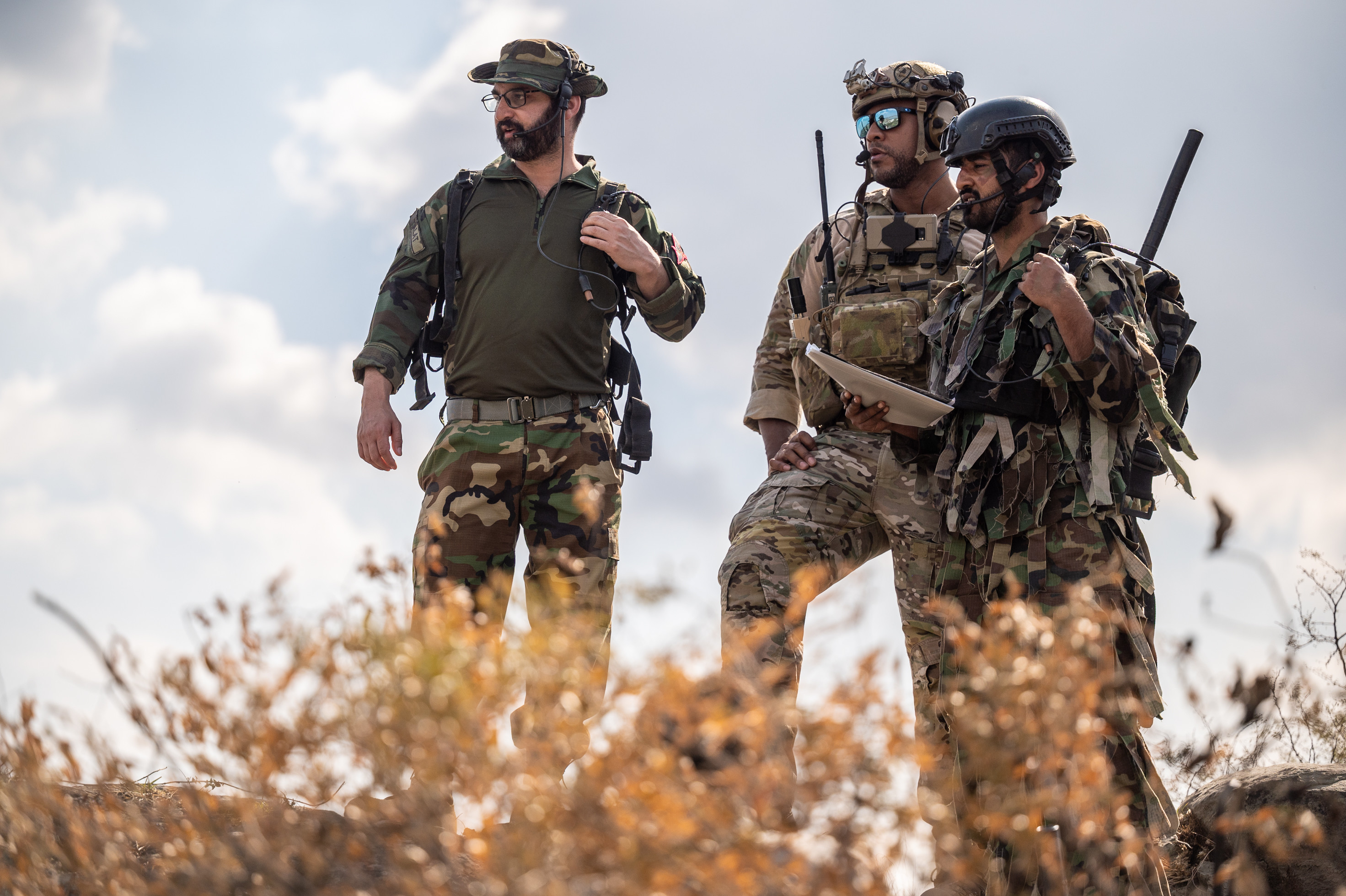
Pakistan Air Force SSW commandos with a USAF Special Forces operator

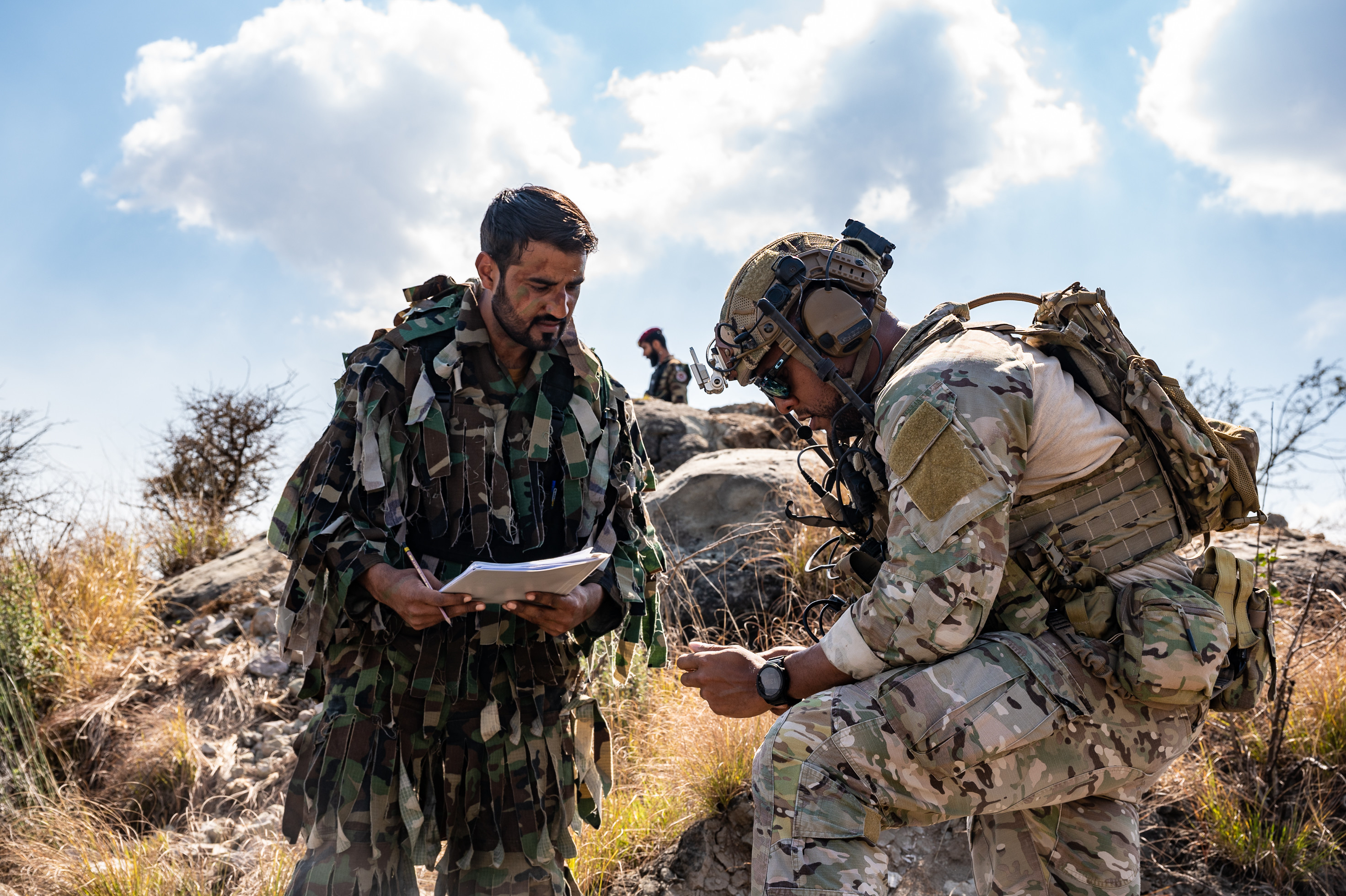
USAF & PAF Special Forces coordinate during Falcon Talon 2022

== Organization ==
The SSW is designed to execute difficult aerial and land operations, serving as equivalent to the US Air Force's Special Tactics Squadron units.

Special Services Wing has five squadrons and one separate Flight Wing.

- Each Squadron consists of 250–400 men. Squadrons are divided into numerous flights which are further subdivided into 10-12 men teams. Squadrons are commanded by Wing Commanders/Squadron leaders.

The Commando Squadrons Of PAF Special Services Wings (SSW)
PAF Special Operations Squadrons	Nick	Details
PAF 1st Special Operations Squadron	(1st SOS)	The No. 1st Special Operation Squadron is one of PAF's aggressor squadron. The members of No. 1 Special Operations Squadron are fighter-pilots by profession graduated from Combat Commander's School, but are also trained to participate with Pakistan Army's SSG Anti-Terrorist Group. The No. 1 SOS are currently participated in War in West-Pakistan along with Navy's SSG Naval Special Forces. They are distinguished when they had participated in Operation Black Thunderstorm led by Pakistan Army's 50th Airborne Division
PAF 2nd Special Operations Squadron	(2nd SOS)	The No. 2 Special Operation Squadron is dispatched with ISI, CIA and 427th Special Operations Squadron. It performs clandestine missions as part of the Global War on Terrorism, as part of the effort to destroy Al Qaeda.
PAF No. 3rd Special Operations Squadron	(3rd SOS)	Anti Terrorist and Hostage Rescue Squadron, The No. 3 Squadron is trained for an immediate evacuation of hostages and high-value military personnel in a war-zone crises.
PAF No. 4th Special Operations Squadron	(4th SOS)	The No. 4 Squadron is based on providing Very Important Person (VIP) protection to state leaders and other VIP personnel's flight. The No. 4th Squadron is currently assigned to Islamabad, Pakistan.
PAF No. 5th Paratrooper Training Squadron	(5th PTS)	The members of No. 5th Paratrooper Squadrons are the Airborne forces of Pakistan Air Force. Together, they perform and participated in military operations led by Pakistan Army 50th Airborne Division.
PAF No. 10th Special Reconnaissance Flight Squadron	(10th SRF)	The Number 10th Special Reconnaissance Flight Squadron are tasked with taking reconnaissance flights in enemy territories. The 10th SRF Group is closely associated with Pakistan's ISI Special Operations Directorate (SOD). As of today, the 10th SRF Squadron is participating in War in North-West Pakistan, notably Operation Black Thunderstorm and Operation Rah-e-Nijat, where they had taken numerous reconnaissance sorties and targeted high-value targets.

== Uniform ==
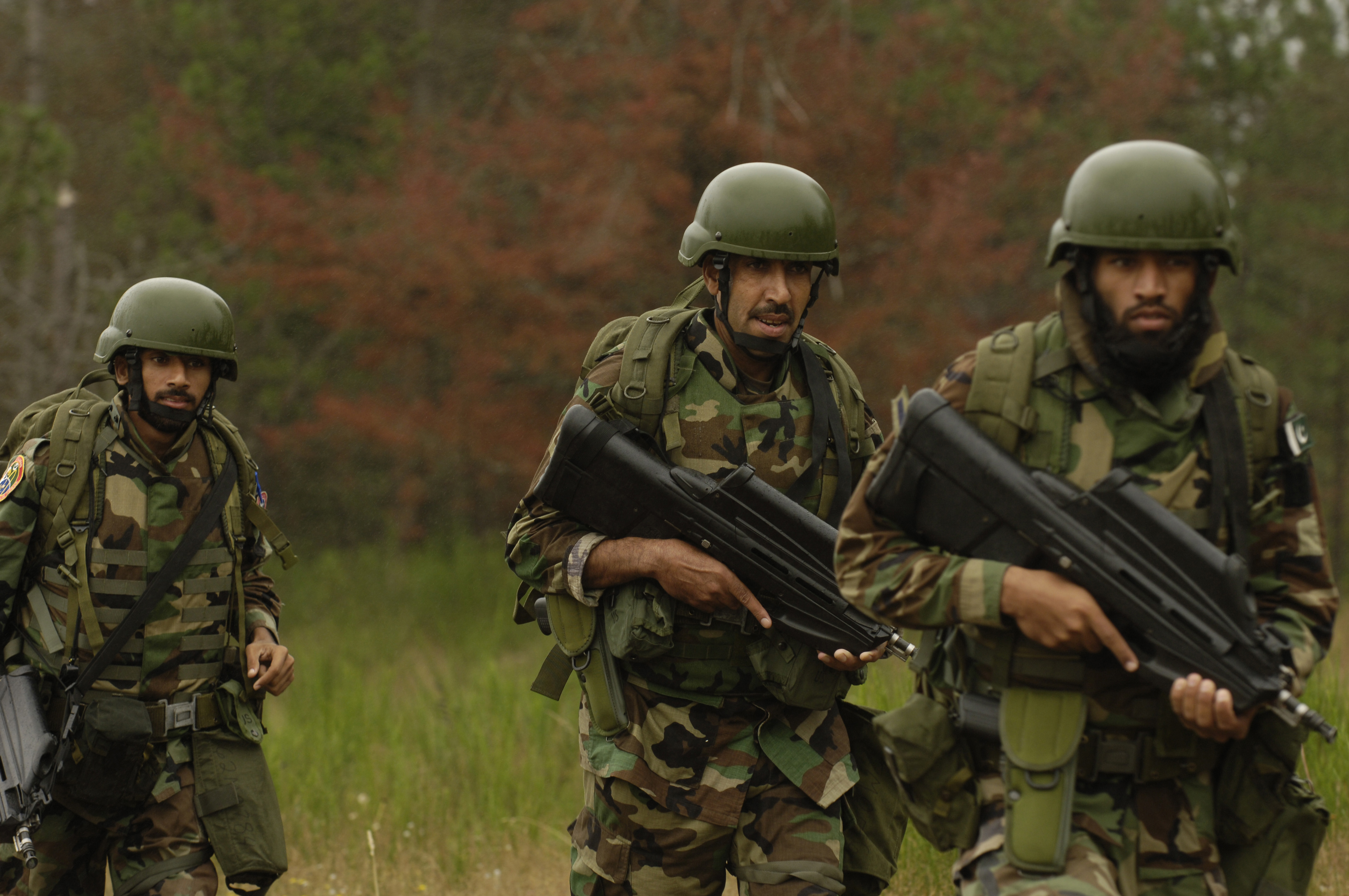
SSW Operatives with FN F2000 during a training session

SSW (Special Services Wing) is distinguished by maroon berets with PAF Officer, JCO or Airmen berret insignia, and a wing on the right side of the chest. The combat uniform of the SSW is green jungle camouflage. They also wear their wing insignia.

== Equipment ==
=== Firearms ===
Image	Name	Type	Origin	OEM	Notes
Pistols
	Glock-17	Semi-automatic pistol	Austria	Glock Ges.m.b.H.	Standard issue sidearm.
	Glock-26	Semi-automatic pistol	Austria	Glock Ges.m.b.H.	Standard issue sidearm.
	FN Five-seven	Semi-automatic pistol	Belgium	FN Herstal	
Submachine guns
	Heckler & Koch MP5	Submachine gun	Germany	Heckler & Koch; Pakistan Ordnance Factories	Locally made variants used. MP-5Kurz and MP-5SD versions also used.
	FN P90	Personal defense weapon	Belgium	FN Herstal	
Assault rifles
	FN F2000	Bullpup AR	Belgium	FN Herstal	Standard issue bullpup rifle.
	Steyr AUG	Bullpup AR	Austria	Steyr Arms	
	M16A1	Assault rifle	United States	Colt	
	Type 56	Assault rifle	China	Norinco	
	M4A1	Carbine	United States	Colt	Standard issue carbine rifle.
Machine guns
	FN Minimi	Squad automatic weapon	Belgium	FN Herstal	
	Rheinmetall MG3	General-purpose machine gun	Germany	Rheinmetall; Pakistan Ordnance Factories	
	FN MAG	General-purpose machine gun	Belgium	FN Herstal	
	Type 81	Light machine gun	China	Norinco	
Sniper rifles
	Barrett M82	Anti-materiel rifle	USA	Barrett	
	Heckler & Koch PSG1	Designated marksman rifle	Germany	Heckler & Koch; Pakistan Ordnance Factories	Also operates local license made PSR-90.
Rotary cannon
	M134/GAU-17/A	Gattling gun	USA	General Electric	

== See also ==
- Special Service Group (Pakistan Army)
- Special Service Group (Navy) (Pakistan Navy)
