= 2016 Quetta police training college attack =

Terrorist attack in Pakistan

Coordinates: 30.3600°N 67.0200°E

Quetta police training college attack
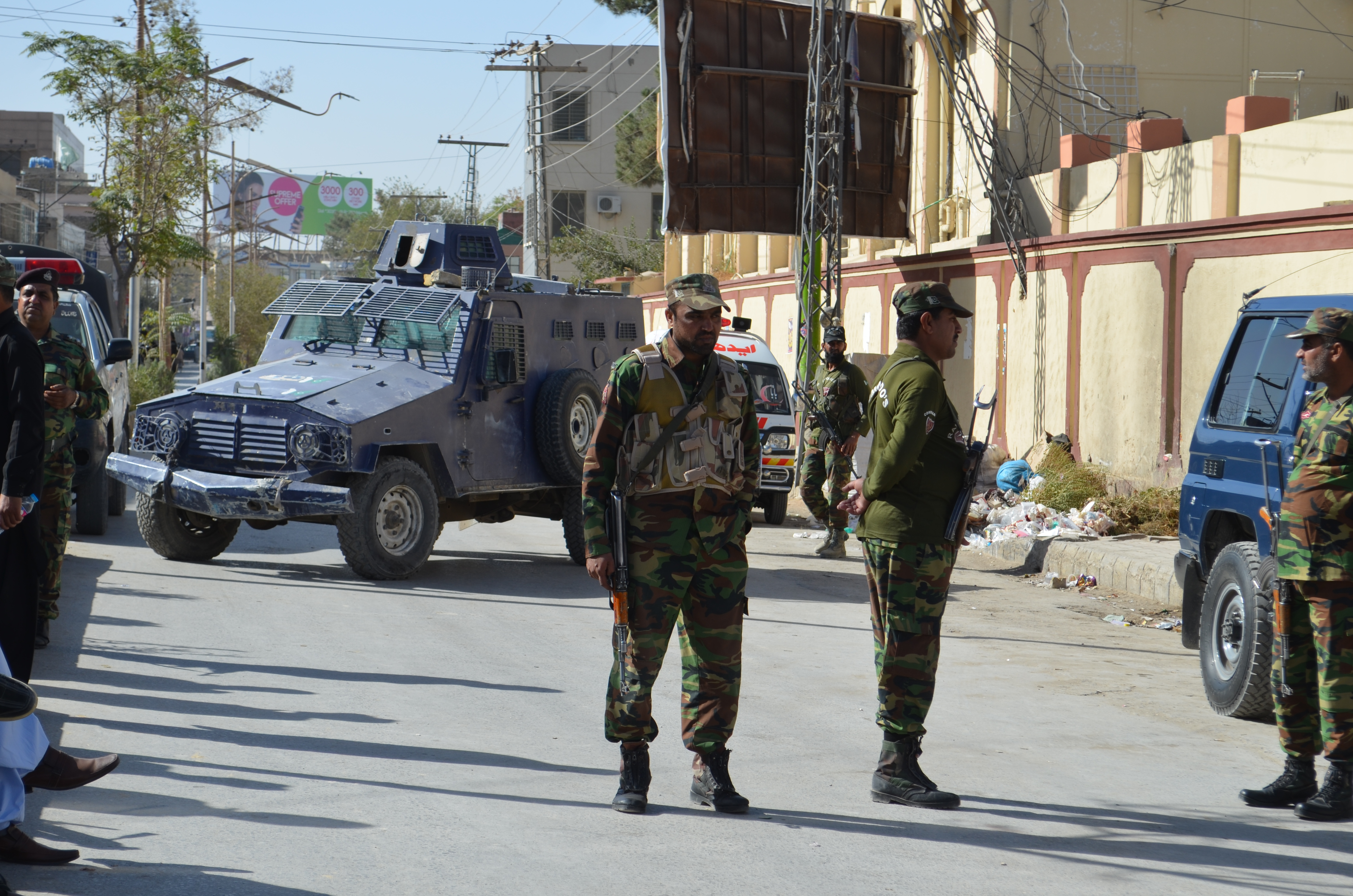
- Location: Balochistan Police College, Quetta, Balochistan, Pakistan
- Date: 24 October 2016
- Target: Police training centre
- Attack type: Mass shooting, suicide bombing, hostage-taking
- Deaths: 62
- Injuries: 165+
- Perpetrators: Islamic State – Khorasan Province; Lashkar-e-Jhangvi
- No. of participants: 3

On 24 October 2016, three heavily armed terrorists carried out an attack on the Balochistan police training college in Quetta, Pakistan, killing 61 cadets and injuring more than 165 others. The Islamic State of Iraq and the Levant – Khorasan Province claimed responsibility for the attack, and Pakistan-based Lashkar-e-Jhangvi claimed to have collaborated with them. According to Pakistani authorities, the assailants came from Afghanistan and were in contact with their handlers there while perpetrating the attack.

== Attack ==
Three militants entered the training centre around 11:10 pm on Tuesday 24 October, while cadets were sleeping, and opened fire before taking hundreds of police cadets hostage and engaging in a standoff with security forces. At least 61 people were killed and over 165 people were injured as well.

All the three gunmen were killed during the attack. Two detonated suicide belts and the third was shot by police. Many of the victims were killed when the attackers detonated their belts.

=== Captain Roohullah Mohmand ===
Captain Roohullah neutralized one suicide bomber and tackled another, who detonated his explosives, killing Captain Roohullah instantly. His courageous action saved numerous lives, as many cadets were able to escape the attack.

His heroic sacrifice earned him the Tamgha-i-Jurat, Pakistan's fourth-highest military honor. Captain Roohullah is remembered as a national hero in Pakistan for his sacrifice.

== Perpetrators ==
Maj. Gen. Sher Afgan, the chief of the Frontier Corps in Quetta, said that a faction of Lashkar-e-Jhangvi, a Pakistan-based sectarian Sunni group, was believed to have carried out the attack. Shortly afterwards, Islamic State of Iraq and the Levant – Khorasan Province (ISIL) claimed responsibility via its Amaq media wing. It also released the photos of the claimed attackers.

A senior security official said that the ISIL had "outsourced" the attack to Lashkar-e-Jhangvi. A spokesman of the Lashkar-e-Jhangvi faction Al-Alami subsequently told Reuters that the two groups (Al-Alami and ISIL) had "done this attack together". Analysts said that the ISIL clearly has a presence in Pakistan and has local groups working with it.

Pakistan's national security advisor Naseer Khan Janjua stated to U.S. ambassador David Hale that India's Research and Analysis Wing and Afghanistan's National Directorate of Security (NDS) were "patronising" terrorist organisations on attacking soft targets in Pakistan, and emphasised the need for effective action against militant elements in Afghanistan linked to the attack.

== Aftermath ==
Prime Minister Nawaz Sharif cancelled all of his engagements and called a meeting with arms officials in Quetta. Chief Minister Sanaullah Zehri revealed on 10 November 2016 the arrest of mastermind and facilitator of the attack.

== Reactions ==
=== International ===
The Chinese Foreign Ministry, French Foreign Minister Jean-Marc Ayrault, Japanese Ministry of Foreign Affair, German Minister of Foreign Affairs Frank-Walter Steinmeier, Indian Vice President Venkaiah Naidu and Indian Defence Minister Manohar Parrikar, Russia President Vladimir Putin, British Foreign Secretary Boris Johnson, United States State Department Spokesperson John Kirby all condemned the attack and expressed their solidarity with Pakistan.

The United Nations and the European Union condemned the terrorist attack, and pledged to "work closely together with Pakistan to fight the global threat of terrorism and expressed condolences to the families of the victims."

== See also ==
- List of terrorist incidents linked to Islamic State – Khorasan Province
- List of Islamist terrorist attacks
- List of terrorist incidents in October 2016
- List of terrorist incidents linked to ISIL
- List of terrorist incidents linked to ISIL (IS-K)
- Terrorist incidents in Pakistan in 2016
- January 2016 Quetta suicide bombing
- August 2016 Quetta bombing
- 2014 Peshawar school massacre
- Quetta attacks
