= Parachute Training School (Pakistan Army) =

Military institution

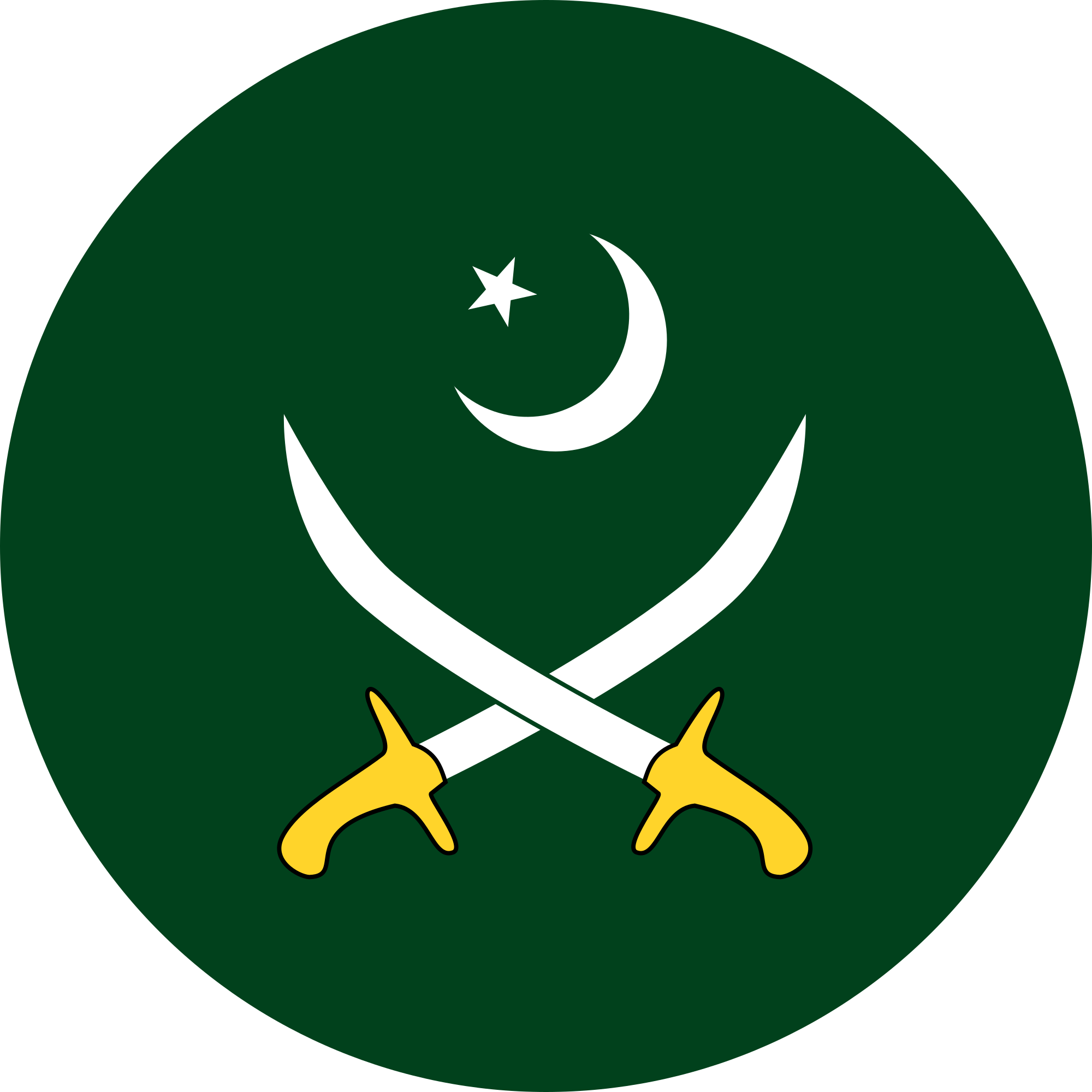
- Badge of Pakistan Army
- Active: 1964; 62 years ago
- Country: Pakistan
- Branch: Pakistan Army
- Type: Training formation
- Garrison/HQ: Peshawar Cantt, Khyber-Pakhtunkhwa in Pakistan.
- Nickname: PTS

The Parachute Training School (reporting name: PTS) is a training formation of the Pakistan Army that provides the imparting basic and advance airborne skills to all levels of its command structure.

The Parachute Training School is located and headquartered in Peshawar Cantt, Khyber-Pakhtunkhwa in Pakistan.

== Training overview ==
The Parachute Training School (PTS) was established in Peshawar Cantt, Khyber-Pakhtunkhwa in 1964. The Parachute Training School was established with the crucial help from the United States Army's 10th Special Forces Group as a small military section on basic parachuting but its training scope was increased and further expanded into full-fledged airborne training formation on 22 March 1981.

== Courses ==
It conducts five parachuting courses:

- Basic Airborne Course
- Jumpmaster and Airborne Operation Course
- High Altitude and Low Opening Course
- Pathfinder Course
- Parachute Packing and Maintenance Course

== Aircraft used in training ==
- C-130 Hercules
- CASA CN-235
- Mil Mi-17

== See also ==
- Special Services Group
