= Mukhtar Ahmad Dogar =

Pakistani Air Commodore (1922-2004)

Air Commodore M. A. Dogar SJ TPk
- ایم اے ڈوگر

Personal details
- Born: Mukhtar Ahmad Dogar; 15 May 1922 Hoshiarpur, British India
- Died: 5 June 2004 (aged 82)
- Resting place: Faisalabad, Pakistan
- Children: 4
- Education: RAF College Cranwell

Military service
- Branch/service: Royal Indian Air Force (1943-1946); Pakistan Air Force (1947-1968)
- Years of service: 1943-1968
- Unit: No. 5 Squadron PAF
- Commands: PAF Base Dacca; Air Intelligence; No. 12 Squadron PAF
- Battles/wars: World War II; Burma Campaign; India–Pakistan war of 1947–1948; India–Pakistan war of 1965; Indo-Pakistani Air War of 1965
- Awards: See list

Mukhtar Ahmad Dogar (Note: Urdu: مختار احمد ڈوگر Sometimes spelled as Mukhtar Ahmed Dogar) (15 May 1922 – 5 June 2004) also known as M. A. Dogar, was a retired Pakistani one-star rank of the Pakistan Air Force and an agriculturalist. He was the first air force officer to receive the Sitara-e-Jurat for his role in the India-Pakistan war of 1947-1948.

A World War II veteran, he is known for his participation in Indo-Pakistani War of 1947 most notably for the "Defenceless Dakota" incident in which he engaged by two IAF Hawker Tempest's while performing transport operations but still managing to bring back his Douglas DC-3.

Dogar was reputed to have been instrumental, as the founding father, in the creation of a special forces unit for the Pakistan Air Force of what is now known as the Special Service Wing (SSW).

== Early life and education ==
Mukhtar Ahmad Dogar was born in Hoshiarpur, Punjab, British India on 15 May 1922. He was the son of Hakim Ali Dogar.

== Service years ==
=== Royal Indian Air Force (1943-1947) ===
He was commissioned into the Royal Indian Air Force on 29 September 1943, after receiving pilot training as a member of No 16 Course, which ran from 29 September 1942 to 29 March 1943.

He was posted to No.9 Squadron based in Bohpal, joining on 10 January 1944 and leaving on 19 April 1944 on being posted to No.10 Squadron, which he joined on 2 May 1944.

No.10 Squadron was formed on 20 February 1944 at Lahore and was equipped with the Hawker Hurricane IIc fighter. He was promoted Flying Officer 29 March 1944.

The Squadron commenced training shortly thereafter and had moved between various locations during this time until the beginning of November 1944, when based at Ranchi, the squadron was designated as a ground support squadron.

Deemed operational, they joined the campaign in Burma on 23 December 1944, when No.10 flew into Ramu and commenced supporting the troops operating the Kaladan Valley from then up to the end of April 1945.

It was then taken off operations awaiting re-equipping with Spitfires. It was deemed successfully converted and sent back to Burma in September 1945, just as the war in the Far East ended.

The squadron remained in Burma until February 1946. He left the squadron at the end of May 1946 and was posted to the strength of No. 1 Demobilisation Centre awaiting his official release, which was granted in late December 1946.

=== Pakistan Air Force (1947-1968) ===
After the Partition of British India in August 1947, Flying Officer Dogar opted for the Royal Pakistan Air Force and was posted to No. 5 Sqn.

After Indian forces entered Kashmir during the Kashmir unrest, Dogar was stationed at Gilgit-Baltistan for air transport & supply services.

On 4 November 1948, Dogar was piloting a DC-3C transporter in the valleys of Kashmir when he was intercepted by two Indian Air Force (IAF) Hawker Tempest fighters.

The Indian pilots ordered him to surrender and land at Srinagar. Though unarmed and unable to retaliate, the undaunted pilot refused to surrender and after nearly 30 minutes of constant evasive maneuvers, he managed to take his plane back to Pakistan. Though one of the occupants on the plane later died due to bullet wounds sustained from the strafing IAF Fighters.

=== Kashmir Valley operations ===
Pakistan, faced with limited aircraft and hazardous weather, issued specific orders to PAF to not be involved in the conflict while the ground operations were undertaken by the Army apart from providing limited air dropped supplies.

In the early morning of 4 November 1948, Dogar, along with Flying Officer Jagjivan, took off to air drop supplies to the Pakistani forces at Skardu. While returning to base, the pilots had spotted the IAF's Hawker Tempests. At first, Dogar believed it was the Pakistani aircraft, but the pilots had not received any early warning from the Air Force control base.

Dogar continued tracking the IAF pilots. After 15 minutes, on the radio, the IAF Tempests pilots ordered Dogar and Jagjivan to go to the nearest Indian airfield but Dogar and Jagjivan gave no response to the order and continued flying to Risalpur Airbase. The order was repeated three times but the PAF pilots did not respond. At this point the IAF pilots threatened to shoot down Dogar and Jagjivan if the orders weren't followed. The IAF pilots fired a free burst to show that they were armed.

Dogar and Jagjivan tried to avoid to respond as they had been given orders by the Government of Pakistan. The Pakisatan army personnel onboard had requested the pilots to ease off, not knowing what was happening at this point.

Flying Officer Alfred Jagjivan and Naik Mohammad Din, however, stood watching from the open doorway of the aircraft, unaware of what was to come to them a minute later.

At this time, one of the Indian Air Force (IAF) pilots broke off, gained a little height and came in to attack. He fired a full burst of 20 mm at the PAF Dakota, fatally wounding Naik Mohammad Din and knocking Jagjivan unconscious with a profusely bleeding arm.

Flying Officer Dogar responded with evasive maneuvers by which he kept on evading the Indian planes until he crossed the Pakistan border and they gave up. The encounter had lasted twenty to twenty-five minutes.

Air Commodore Dogar and Air Commodore Alfred Jagjivan were subsequently awarded the Sitara-e-Jurat for the daring handling of the Dakota while under attack from Indian Air Force fighters on 4 November 1948. His Sitara-e-Jurat (Star of Courage) award was the first for Pakistan Air Force.

=== Indo-Pakistani War of 1965 ===
Dogar had participated in Operation Gibraltar, and was instrumental in creating a special forces unit within the Pakistan Air Force (PAF). Dogar established and founded the "Special Airwarfare Wing" (now-known as Special Service Wing), where he had served there as first Air Commodore-in-Chief. He played an important role, and headed the SAW until his retirement in 1968.

=== Career highlights ===
Dogar served on various command and staff assignments during his career in PAF, which included OC Flying Wing Lahore in 1956, Deputy Director Plans at AHQ in 1957, Director Operations at Pakistan International Airlines (PIA) in 1959. He also was the Officer Commanding Dacca Base from 1960 to 1963. He commanded PAF Base, Chaklala and Peshawar as well.

=== A rare honour ===
Dogar was the only PAF officer who had flown such a large variety of aircraft during his long and illustrious service. He had flown more than 35 fighter, transport, light communication and bomber aircraft. Dogar retired from service in 1968.

=== Tamgha-e-Pakistan citation ===
His Tamgha-e-Pakistan citation reads:

CITATION
GROUP CAPTAIN MUKHTAR AHMAD DOGAR (PAK/2353)

"Gp Capt Mukhtar Ahmed Dogar has made a significant contribution towards planning, control and conduct of special operations during the war with India. In May 1965, he was asked to set up the Joint Operations Centre while at the same time he was a member of the planning committee at AHQ. In that capacity, he was entrusted with the conduct of special transport operations. The task he carried out very successfully in close liaison with the army often carrying out complicated operations at very short notice. For this selfless devotion to duty, he has been awarded with TPk"

== Death and legacy ==
Mukhtar Ahmad Dogar died on 5 June 2004 and was buried at his native town Faisalabad, Punjab, Pakistan. He was survived by his wife and four children.

Air Marshal Asghar Khan described him as an "upright and straightforward officer".
