= Naval Special Warfare Group 3 =

Former formation of the U.S. Naval Special Warfare Command

U.S. Navy Special Warfare Group 3
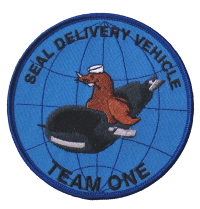
- Country: United States
- Branch: United States Navy
- Type: Special operations force
- Size: 667 personnel authorized: 620 military personnel; 47 civilian personnel
- Part of: U.S. Special Operations Command; U.S. Naval Special Warfare Command
- Garrison/HQ: Naval Amphibious Base Coronado, California
- Mottos: "The Only Easy Day Was Yesterday" "It Pays to be a Winner" "There is no 'I' in TEAM"
- Engagements: Liberation of Panama; Operation Just Cause; Persian Gulf War; Operation Desert Storm; Global War on Terrorism: Operation Enduring Freedom; Operation Red Wings (SDVT-1); Iraq War; Operation Iraqi Freedom

Commanders
- Notable commanders: P. Gardner Howe, III

Naval Special Warfare Group 3 (NSWG-3), based at Naval Amphibious Base Coronado in California, was one of six constituent formations of the United States Naval Special Warfare Command. Until 2008, NSWG-3 was composed of two SEAL Delivery Vehicle Teams: SDVT-1 in Pearl Harbor and SDVT-2 in Little Creek. In 2008, SDVT-2 was disestablished and merged into SDVT-1, which was then now headquartered in Pearl Harbor and operated detachments in Pearl Harbor and Little Creek. SDV Teams are SEAL teams with an added underwater delivery capability. SDVT-2 was reactivated on 8 March 2019. NSWG-3 was deactivated alongside NSWG-10 in August 2021 and replaced by Naval Special Warfare Group 8 which took in all units previously under NSWG-3 and NSWG-10.

== Naval Special Warfare Group 3 Introduction ==
Naval Special Warfare Group 3 was one of the principal groups responsible for the organization’s leadership and deployment of United States Navy SEALs. The word SEAL is an acronym that stands for SEa, Air, and Land. This is named for the principal domains of operation that SEALs operate in. As the United States Navy’s primary special operations force it is imperative that they are highly functional in any terrain as they carry out the unconventional warfare missions that they are tasked with. There were many elements of Naval Special Warfare Group 3 that proved to be pivotal to the security of the United States. Such facets of Naval Special Warfare Group 3 included training, technology, and allies.

=== Training ===
One aspect of Naval Special Warfare Group 3 that was of importance included the continuous training regiment and upkeep of skills and abilities of the Navy SEALs; from the first day of the SEAL pipeline it usually takes about a year and a half of intensive training before a SEAL is ready to report to a SEAL Team. As of 2018, Naval Special Warfare had decided to triple the amount of SEAL training in the Hawaiian Islands. This was an important development in the Naval Special Warfare community as it showed a shift in focus for future training. This also showed how the command within Naval Special Warfare Group 3 might have been training for a domain different from that of recent history (Iraq, Afghanistan). As stated, “after sixteen years of focusing predominantly on the terrain of Iraq and Afghanistan, they are expanding their training to be ready for other, more varied environments to be prepared for the missions to come”. This point also led to the transition of the entire U.S. Navy and its future plans with the help of Naval Special Warfare Group 3. Observations noted that a “strategic change to a ‘balance of power’ approach to deterrence should mean a tilt towards the Navy’s traditional missions” as well as how “inter-state strategic competition, not terrorism, is now the primary concern in U.S. national security”. Returning to the Hawaiian Islands, the prime location of the islands offered SEALs the ability to conduct a multitude of training operations which include but are not limited to “scuba diving and launching and recovering submersibles, while land-based training would include transiting over the beach on foot and parachute insertions”.

=== Technology ===
Another key component to Naval Special Warfare Group 3 was their use of SEAL Delivery Vehicles and subsequent SEAL Delivery Vehicle Teams. According to Stavros Atlamazoglou of SOFREP, the Naval Special Warfare Command had decided to reactivate SEAL Delivery Vehicle Team 2 (SDVT-2) stationed on the East Coast. SEAL Delivery Vehicle Teams offered the Naval Special Warfare Community a unique opportunity to approach a designated target with minimal detection.

=== Allies ===
Another major importance for Naval Special Warfare Group 3 included relationships with other special forces groups. Naval Special Warfare is at the forefront of training and dominance over all terrains operators can be involved in, with an emphasis on the ocean. With that being said, it could be very beneficial for the United States to use Naval Special Warfare to train up other nations’ special forces. According to Targeted News Service, this has been done over the past several years and recipient countries include Brazil, Panama, Colombia, and Peru. This joint nation special forces training took place during the PANAMAX multi-nation training operation; training was conducted in order to practice real-world scenarios that may arise and must be contained by allied partners. With the help of Naval Special Warfare Group 3 and subsequent SEAL and SWCC (Special Warfare Combatant-Craft Crewman) operators, PANAMAX was able to effectively train up the allies of the United States and ensure they are prepared for a potential attack on the Panama Canal.

== SDVT-1 ==
SEAL Delivery Vehicle Team One (SDVT-1) is commanded by a Navy Commander (O-5). The table of equipment for the unit included three operational SEAL Delivery Vehicles (SDV) and a Dry Deck Shelter (DDS). The normal table of organization includes three task units and a headquarters element. Each SDV Task Unit operates independently from a host submarine in the conduct of Naval Special Warfare missions. SDV Task Units typically deploy aboard host submarines, but may be deployed from shore or surface ships. The 40-man SDV Task Units are formed of a Headquarters element and 2 platoons of 16 men, comprising 11 SEALs, 1 dive medical technician, and 4 fleet support maintenance technicians. SDVT-1 conducts operations throughout the Pacific Command's and Central Command's geographic areas of responsibility. SDVT-1 was initially headquartered in Coronado, California before being moved to Pearl Harbor in 1994. With Naval Special Warfare Group 3's deactivation in August 2021, SDVT-1 was transferred to Naval Special Warfare Group 8.

== SDVT-2 ==
SDVT-2 is a team of Navy divers, SEALs, and SDV technicians based in Little Creek, Virginia, and commanded by a Commander (O-5). It gives the Navy's SEAL Delivery Vehicles a base for operations on the East Coast and in Europe. SDVT-2 was disestablished on 8 August 2008. SDVT-2 was merged into SDVT-1, although the Navy continued to operate a small Dry Deck Shelter establishment at Little Creek, albeit under the command of SDVT-1. SDVT-2 was reactivated on 8 March 2019. With Naval Special Warfare Group 3's deactivation in August 2021, SDVT-2 was transferred to Naval Special Warfare Group 8.

== Mission ==
NSWG-3 was tasked with developing expertise in deploying Naval Special Warfare assets from submarines. Current non-classified methods of deployment include the SEAL Delivery Vehicle (SDV) from dry deck shelters on submarines. The Advanced SEAL Delivery System (ASDS) was also used before its cancellation. The SDV is planned to be replaced by the Shallow Water Combat Submersible in 2019, and the ASDS will be replaced with the Dry Combat Submersible. Naval Special Warfare Group 3 and Naval Special Warfare group 10 were both deactivated in August 2021 and replaced by Naval Special Warfare Group 8, which took on all units previously assigned to NSWG-3 and NSWG-10. This restructuring was in response to emerging threats from China and Russia and reportedly seeks to realign the Navy's intelligence-gathering capabilities.

== History ==
The SDV program dates back to World War II, when various sleds and vehicles developed for use by the Underwater Demolition Teams. After the war, development continued in a garage-shop fashion by various UDT units, and included various "Marks" as the MK V, VII, VII, and XII. Intermediate numbers were assigned to some vehicles that never left the shop floor. All were of flooded design.

The wet vehicle SDV program (officially named the Swimmer Delivery Vehicle, sometimes erroneously designated as the SEAL Delivery Vehicle after the Swimmer Delivery Vehicle Teams were renamed SEAL Delivery Vehicle Teams) currently centers on the MK VIII MOD 1, was first established in 1975 for use among UDT/SEAL teams. The early MK8 MOD 0 SDVs had a PRC104 UHF ultra high frequency radio for use underway. The newer model MK8 MOD1 has a dual sliding canopy and quick release hatch.
