= SEAL Delivery Vehicle =

Manned wet submersible for deploying naval special forces

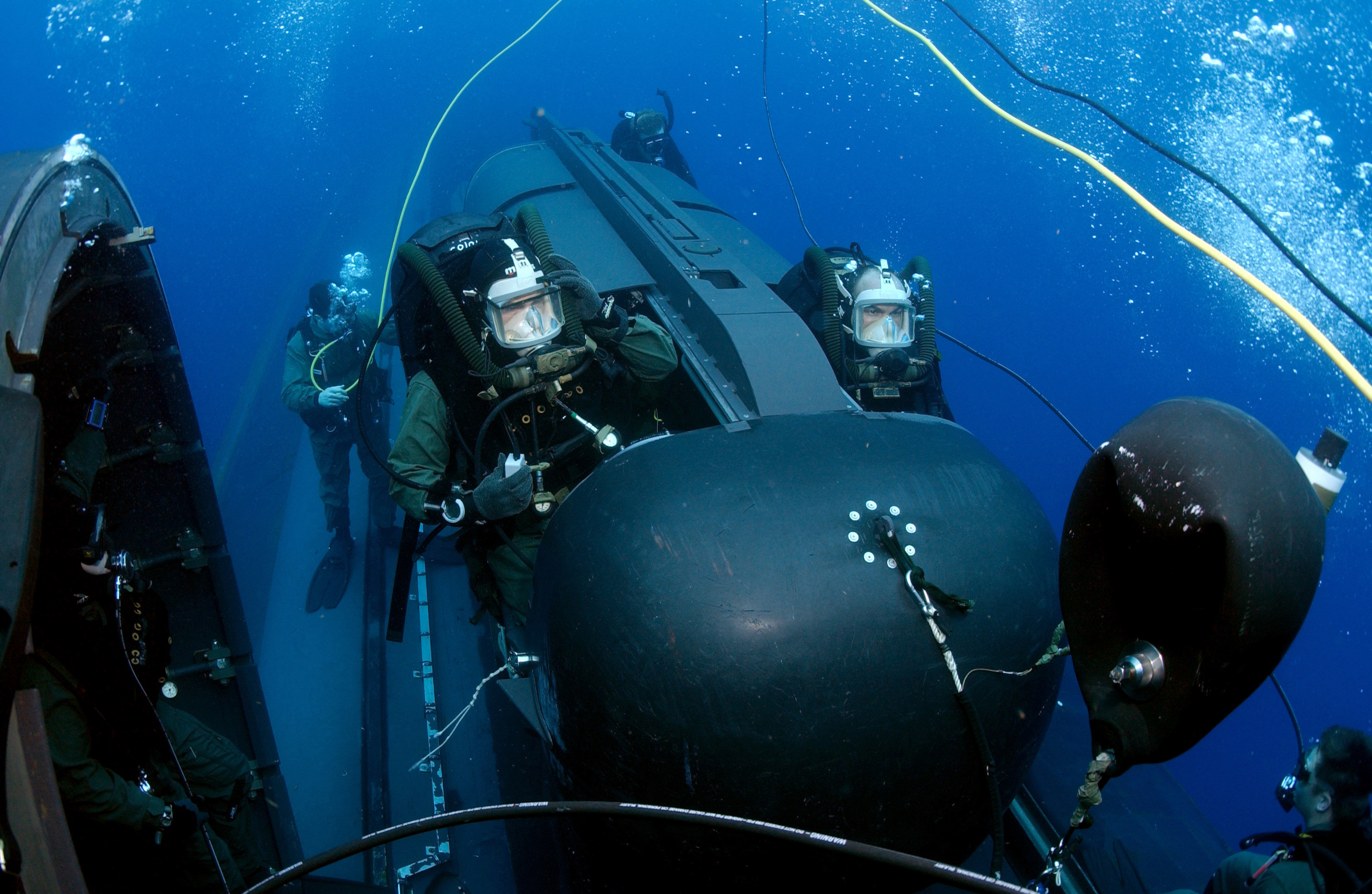
- SEAL Delivery Vehicle Team Two launch an SDV from Los Angeles-class submarine USS Philadelphia

Class overview
- Builders: The Columbia Group
- Operators: United States Navy; Royal Navy
- Succeeded by: Shallow Water Combat Submersible (planned)
- In commission: Since 1983

General characteristics
- Type: Submersible, diver propulsion vehicle
- Displacement: 17 tons (15.4 tonnes)
- Length: 6.7 meters (22 ft)
- Beam: 1.8 meters (5.9 ft)
- Propulsion: Silver-zinc batteries powering an electric motor and single screw propeller
- Speed: 6 kn (11 km/h) (top speed); 4 kn (7.4 km/h) (cruising speed)
- Range: 15 to 18 nmi (28 to 33 km) with diving team; 36 nmi (67 km) without
- Endurance: 8 to 12 hours
- Test depth: 6 meters (20 ft)
- Complement: 6 (2 crew, 4 passengers)
- Sensors & processing systems: Doppler Inertial Navigation System, high frequency sonar for obstacle/mine avoidance and navigation, GPS
- Armament: SEAL team personal weapons, limpet mines
- Notes: Specifications are given for Mark 8 SDV

The SEAL Delivery Vehicle (SDV), also known as Swimmer Delivery Vehicle, is a crewed submersible and a type of swimmer delivery vehicle used to deliver United States Navy SEALs and their equipment for special operations missions. It is operated by SEAL Delivery Vehicle Teams.

The SDV, which has been in continuous service since 1983, is used primarily for covert or clandestine missions to denied access areas (either held by hostile forces or where military activity would draw notice and objection). It is generally deployed from the Dry Deck Shelter on a specially-modified attack or ballistic missile submarines, although it can also be launched from surface ships or land. It has seen combat in the Gulf War, Iraq War, and the US intervention in Somalia.

The SDV was intended to be replaced with the Advanced SEAL Delivery System (ASDS), a larger, dry submersible that is often confused with the SDV. The SDV is flooded, and the swimmers ride exposed to the water, breathing from the vehicle's compressed air supply or using their own SCUBA gear, while the ASDS is dry inside and equipped with a full life support and air conditioning system. The ASDS was canceled in 2009 due to cost overruns and the loss of the prototype in a fire. The Navy currently plans to replace the SDV with the Shallow Water Combat Submersible (SWCS), which will be designated the Mark 11 SDV. The SWCS was expected to enter service in 2019.

== History ==
The SDV program dates back to World War II. Initiated by the Office of Strategic Services Maritime Unit (OSS MU). A "submersible canoe" was invented by the Italians during World War I. The idea was successfully applied by the Italian Navy (Regia Marina) also early in World War II. The official Italian name for their craft was Siluro a Lenta Corsa (SLC or "Slow-running torpedo"). The vehicle was then copied by the British when they discovered the Italian operations and called it the "Sleeping Beauty" or Motorised Submersible Canoe. It was employed by OSS MU during extensive training and exercises, but was never actually deployed for combat operations.

The same capability was adopted by the American Underwater Demolition Teams (UDTs) in 1947. The one-man submersible displayed little functional military potential. However, it substantiated and characterized the need for improved and expanded UDT capabilities. After the war, development continued in a garage-shop fashion by various UDT units, and included various "Marks" such as the Mark V, VI, and VII. Intermediate numbers were assigned to some vehicles that never made it off the shop floor. All were of flooded design.

The first SDV to be operationally deployed was the Mark VII, which entered service in June 1972 after being tested between 1967 and 1972. It could carry three SEALs plus a pilot sitting in compartments fore and aft. It had a hull made from fiberglass and non-ferrous metals to hinder detection and was powered by a silver-zinc battery attached to an electric motor. The Mark VIII SDV, the model that is still in use today, began to supplant the Mark VII starting in 1983.

The wet vehicle SDV program (officially named the Swimmer Delivery Vehicle, later re-designated the SEAL Delivery Vehicle after the Swimmer Delivery Vehicle Teams were renamed SEAL Delivery Vehicle Teams) currently centers on the Mark VIII Mod 1. The SDV was first developed in 1975 for use among UDT/SEAL teams. The early Mark 8 Mod 0 SDVs had a PRC104 UHF radio for use underwater. The newer model Mark 8 Mod 1 has a dual sliding canopy and quick release hatch.

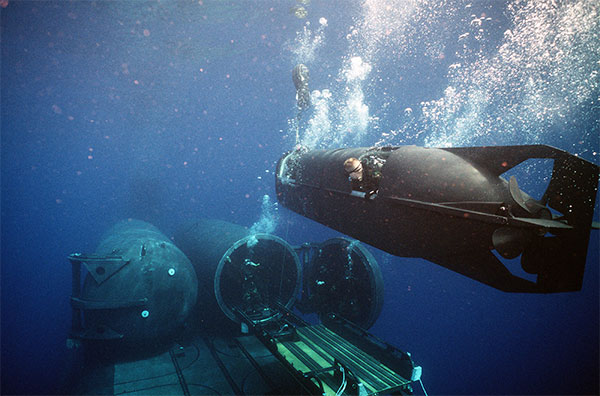
A Seal Delivery Vehicle maneuvers into a drydeck on the submarine USS Kamehameha

== Design ==
SDVs carry a pilot, co-pilot, and four person combat swimmer team and their equipment to and from maritime mission objectives on land or at sea. The pilot and co-pilot are often a part of the fighting team. The SDV is silver-zinc battery powered and equipped with propulsion, navigation, communication, and life-support equipment. The batteries directly power the electric motor that drives the single screw propeller. Because they are all electric, SDVs are extremely difficult to detect using passive sonar, and their small size makes them hard to detect using other means. The Mark 8 Mod 1 SDV can deliver four fully equipped SEALs to the mission area, be "parked" or loiter in the area, retrieve the SEALs, and then return to the launch site. The SEALs sit upright in the Mark 8, with the pilot and co-pilot/navigator facing forward and the other four facing aft. For air, the SEALs rely on their own air tanks or rebreathers, supplemented by compressed air tanks on the SDV. The crew and passenger compartment in the Mark 8 is small, cramped, and pitch black except for the dim lights of the instrument panel; SEALs describe riding in an SDV as like "being locked in a little black coffin deep under the water." A 2011 article reported that out of 2,600 SEALS roughly 230 are trained to operate the SDVs.

SDVs are generally launched from a Dry Deck Shelter on the back of a submarine, although they can also be deployed from amphibious carriers and other surface ships equipped to launch and recover the SDV. SDVs are launched and recovered by surface ships using a crane. They can also be airdropped (uncrewed) into an operational area from a C-130 Hercules airplane. Finally, the SDV can be launched from the shore.

An SDV can be launched from one platform and recovered by another. USS John Marshall demonstrated this capability during a multilateral exercise in the Mediterranean when it recovered and then launched another country's SDV.

=== Mark 8 SDV ===
The Mark 8 Mod 1 SDV is the only SDV officially in use by the US Navy and Royal Navy. It is an upgrade of the earlier Mark 8 Mod 0 SDV. The Mod 1 is quieter, faster, more efficient, and has a longer range than the Mod 0. Its updated electronics, materials, and battery and motor systems gives it twice the range and 1.5 times the speed of the Mod 0. Another advantage of the Mark 8 Mod 1 over its predecessor is that it is built from aluminium instead of plastic reinforced fiberglass, making its hull sturdier and roomier. The sturdier hull means that it can be deployed from CH-46 Sea Knight and CH-53E Super Stallion helicopters, although SDVs often break or explode when dropped in the water from a helicopter, making aerial deployments impractical and undesirable.

The Mark 8 Mod 1 SDV has an endurance of about eight to 12 hours, giving it a range of 15 to 18 nmi (28 to 33 km) with a diving team or 36 nmi (67 km) without. The main limiting factor on endurance is not batteries or breathing gas for the SEALs, but water temperature: humans can only spend so much time in cold water, even with wetsuits, before their blood pressure drops and they become dehydrated from losing blood volume and body fluids, respectively.

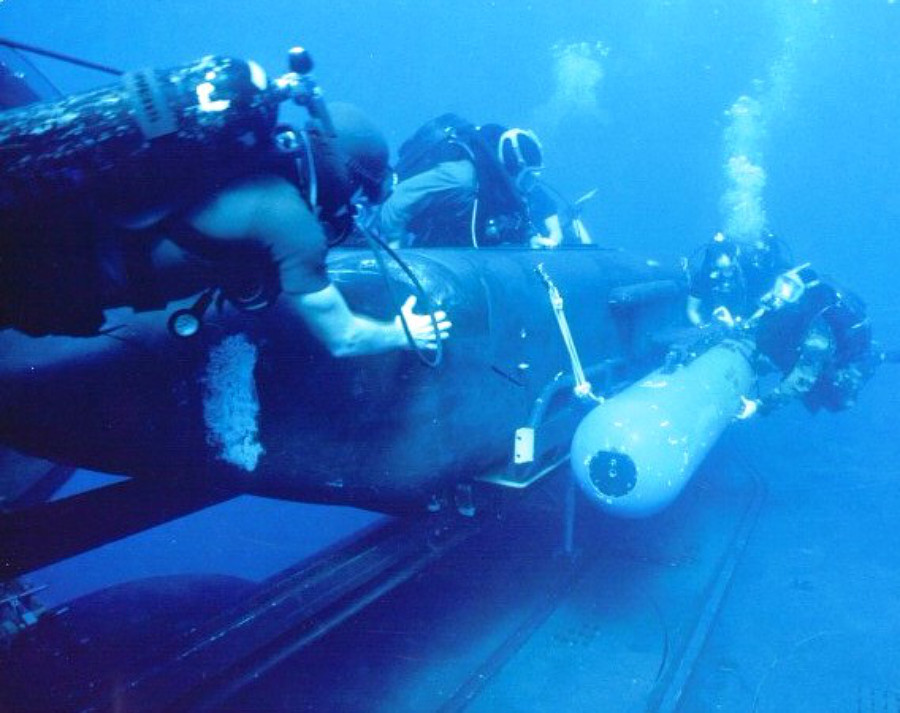
US Navy SEALs deploy a torpedo-armed Mark 9 SDV from a submarine

=== Mark 9 SDV ===
Despite being a development of the Mark 8 SDV, the Mark 9 is a very different vehicle, designed for attacking surface ships rather than deploying SEAL teams on clandestine operations. Indeed, the Mark 9 and Mark 8 share very few common parts. The Mark 9 carries two SEALs, a pilot and a navigator, and two Mark 31 or Mark 37 torpedoes for standoff attacks against ships. These torpedoes can travel up to 3 nautical miles (5.6 km) in a straight line, carry a 330-pound (150 kg) warhead, and are capable of sinking ships as large as cruisers. In addition to torpedoes, the Mark 9 also carried limpet mines and satchel charges in a large cargo compartment aft of the pilot and co-pilot.

The Mark 9 is designed to clandestinely approach enemy vessels while submerged, surface to fire torpedoes, and then escape unnoticed. As such, its design incorporates stealth characteristics, including a lower profile and sonar absorbing materials. The Mark 9 SDV was intended to attack ships in shallow coastal waters that full-size submarines could not enter, and to draw attention of an enemy fleet away from the Mark 9's parent submarine. Though it proved very effective in exercises, the Mark 9 was retired starting in 1989 and was fully phased out of service by the mid-1990s due to manpower and budget constraints and because all of its capabilities save launching torpedoes were duplicated by the Mark 8.

The pilot and navigator operate the vehicle from a prone position and lay side by side. The prone position gave the Mark 9 a low profile and enabled it to operate in very shallow water, although SEALs reported that staying prone for the entire duration of an operation was uncomfortable.

The Mark 9's sleek profile and independent diving planes enabled it to be especially agile. It was also faster than the Mark 8, reaching speeds of 7–9 knots (13–17 km/h), owing to its twin screw propellers and high-performance silver-zinc batteries. Its speed and agility led operators to compare it to flying a fighter jet or driving a sports car.

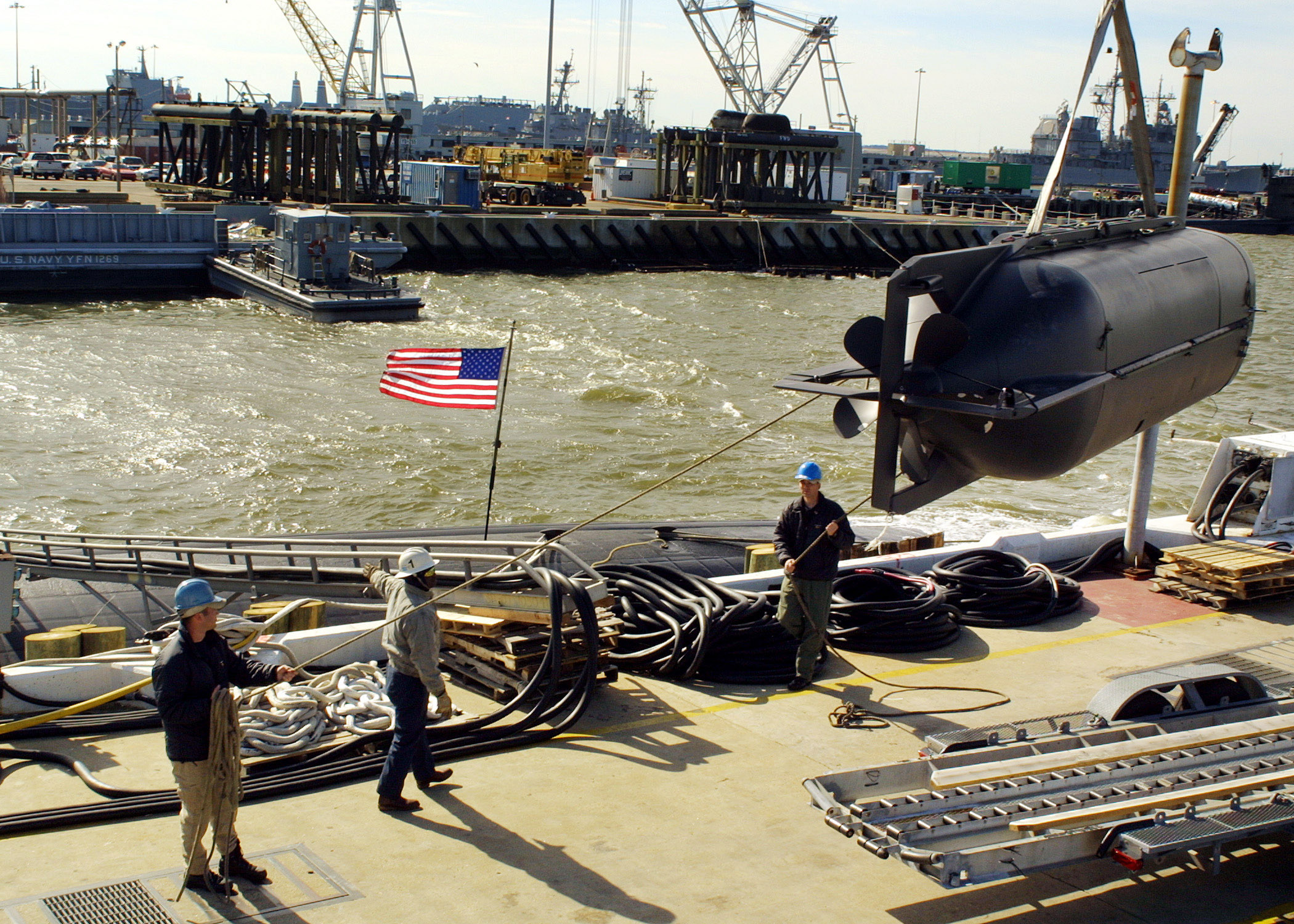
A Mark 8 SDV is loaded aboard Los Angeles-class submarine USS Dallas

== Operational history ==
The SDV is used primarily for inserting SEALs for covert operations or for placing mines on ships. It is also used for underwater mapping and terrain exploration, location and recovery of lost or downed objects, and reconnaissance missions. It has been invaluable at deploying SEAL teams in clandestine missions, as it has enabled them to land on shores inaccessible to a larger submarine with a degree of stealth greater than that offered by small surface craft, helicopters, or other means. In exercises, the SDV has been found to excel at anti-shipping attacks, being able to attack targets in heavily-guarded fleets or docked at military bases and then slip away undetected. Additionally, it can carry larger limpet mines than those carried by a diver and has a much greater range than a diver, enabling attacks on larger and more distant enemy ships. However, the SDV is not without its weaknesses, namely its range, reliability, and mobility. The SDV's short range, which is contingent on sea state, water temperature, payload, and other factors, sometimes hinders operations. In one example, the Navy wanted to use an SDV to get a closer look at a Soviet ship anchored in a Cuban harbor 18 miles (29 km) upriver from the Caribbean Sea. The SDV could not have made the round trip to the Soviet vessel from an American ship outside of Cuba's territorial waters, so the mission had to be called off.

Mark 8 SDVs saw combat during the First Gulf War, where they performed mine reconnaissance and demolition missions. In the Iraq War, Mark 8 SDVs were used to secure offshore oil and gas terminals. Several days before the beginning of the 2003 invasion of Iraq, two SDV teams were launched from Mark V Special Operations Craft in the Persian Gulf. Their objectives were the hydrographic reconnaissance of the Al Basrah (MABOT) and Khawr Al Amaya (KAAOT) Oil Terminals. After swimming under the terminals and securing their Mark 8 Mod 1s, the SDV SEALs spent several hours taking pictures and surveying Iraqi activity on both platforms before returning to their boats. On March 20, 2003, SEALs from SEAL Team 8 and 10 (31 SEALs, 2 Navy EOD, 1 USAF combat controller, and several Iraqi interpreters) moved to seize the MABOT oil terminal and KAAOT Oil Terminals, in part using SDVs. The terminals were quickly seized with no casualties, and explosives which were found on the terminals were made safe by Polish GROM operators.

In 2003, SEALs using SEAL Delivery Vehicles swam ashore along the Somali coastline and emplaced covert surveillance cameras. Known as cardinals, the cameras were designed to watch likely target locations for wanted terrorists as al-Qaeda and its affiliates began to regroup in the country, however the cameras only took one image a day and captured very little.

In American service, the SDV is deployed with SEAL Delivery Vehicle Team 1 (SDVT-1), based in Pearl Harbor, and SEAL Delivery Vehicle Team 2 (SDVT-2), based in Little Creek, Virginia. SDVT-1 operates on behalf of Central Command and Pacific Command in the Middle East and Indian and Pacific Oceans. SDVT-2 operates in the Atlantic and European Command and Southern Command, and is primarily focused on supporting the activities of the Sixth Fleet.

The SDV suffered from reliability concerns early in its lifespan. LCDR Doug Lowe, a member of SDV Team 1 in the 1980s, reported that his team's SDVs were operational less than 50 percent of the time. However, reliability improved with usage: LCDR Lowe later commanded SDV Team 2 in the 1990s and reported that his subs were ready more than 90 percent of the time.

The main failure of the SDV is its poor mobility. The SDV can only be effectively deployed from specially modified submarines and surface ships. Although it can be transported by C-130 airplanes, the relative scarcity of vessels capable of deploying an SDV limits its usage. Submarines are the preferred means of deployment, as enemies can see a surface ship deploying an SDV with a crane, further limiting the SDV's mobility and usage. Modifying a surface ship to launch and recover the SDV through an underwater door, like the Italian Navy had done for its human torpedoes in WWII, would have helped alleviate this problem.

The Special Boat Service of the United Kingdom Special Forces operates three Mark 8 Mod 1 vehicles.

== Operators ==
United States

- United States Navy: Navy SEALs
  - SEAL Delivery Vehicle Team 1 (SDVT-1)
  - SEAL Delivery Vehicle Team 2 (SDVT-2)

United Kingdom

- Royal Navy: Special Boat Service

== Gallery ==
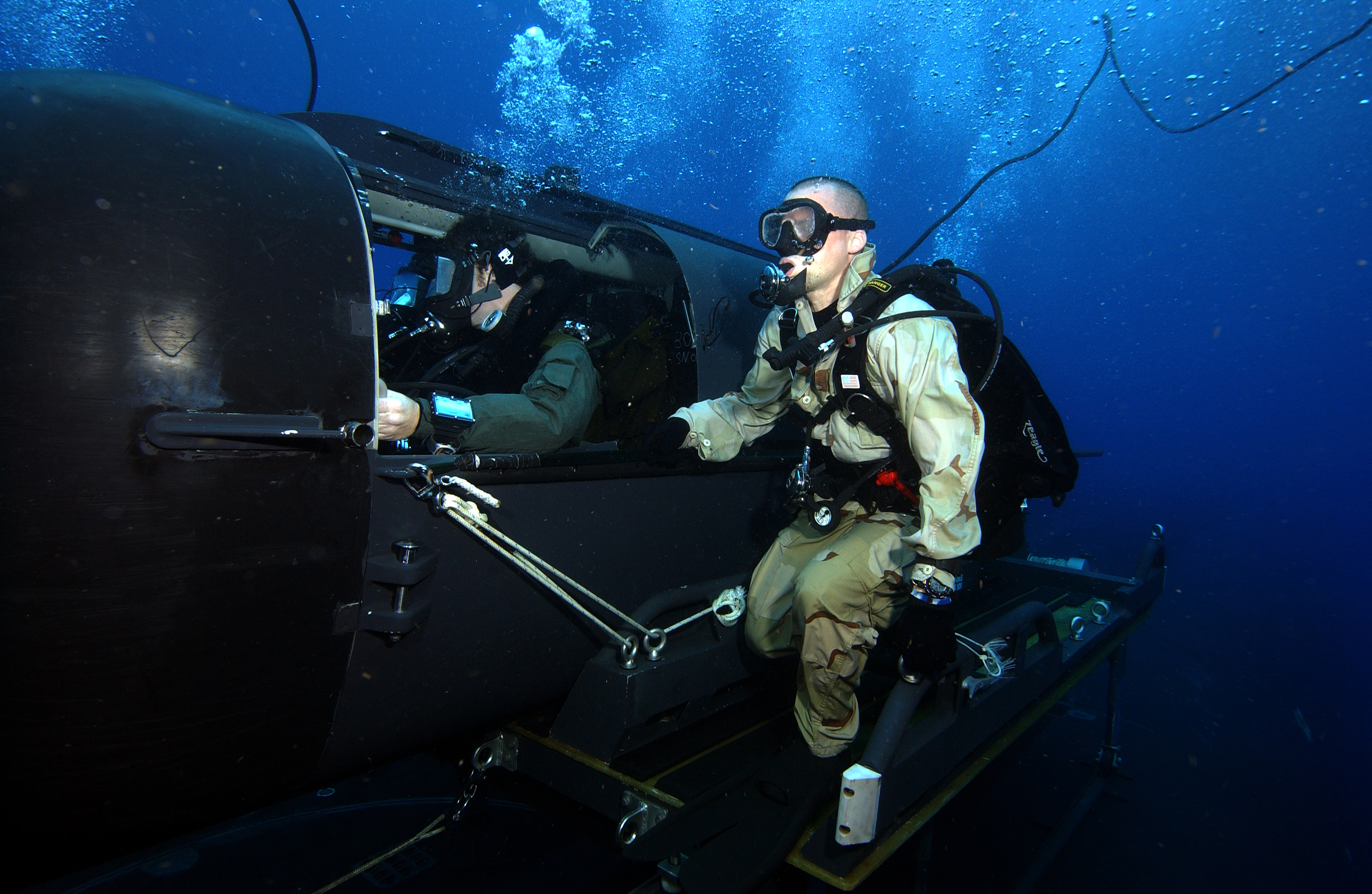
A Navy diver and special operator from SEAL Delivery Team 2 operate an SDV from the nuclear-powered guided-missile submarine USS Florida (SSGN-728)

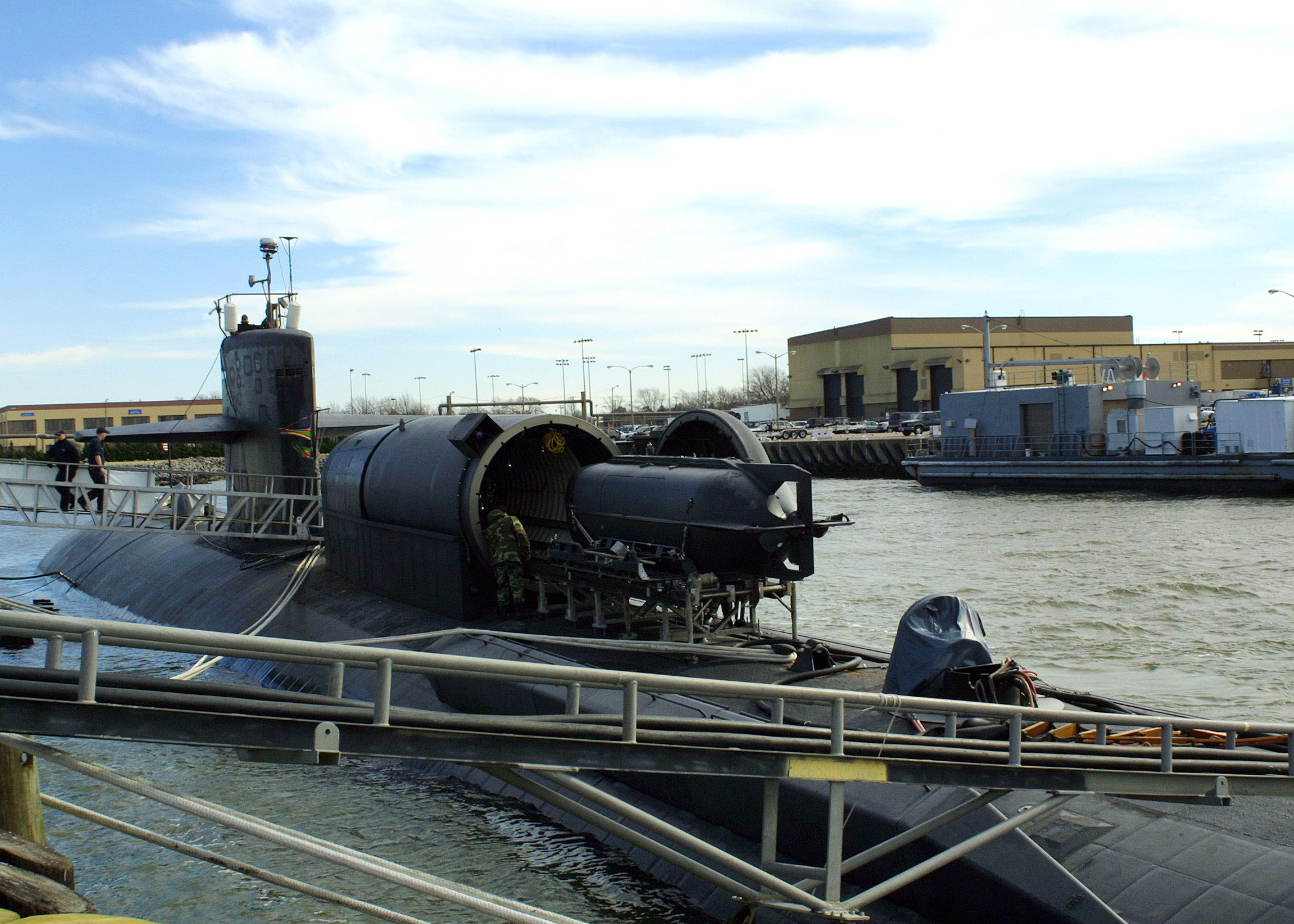
An SDV being loaded aboard Los Angeles-class attack submarine USS Dallas

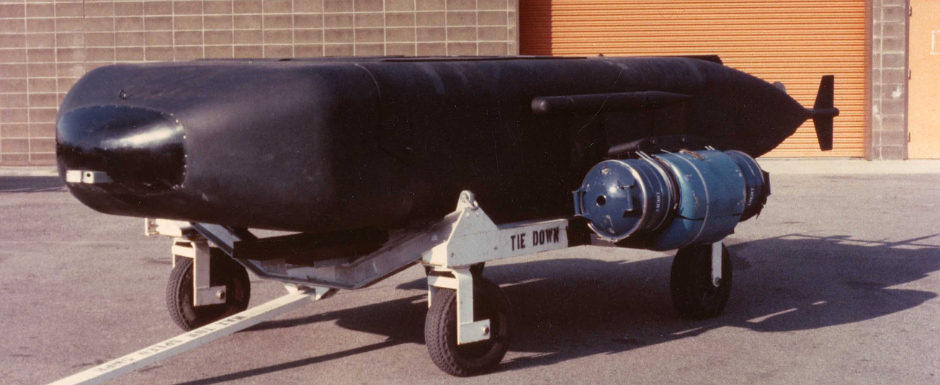
Mark 9 SDV "Little Bo Peep" armed with a LAM-5 mine

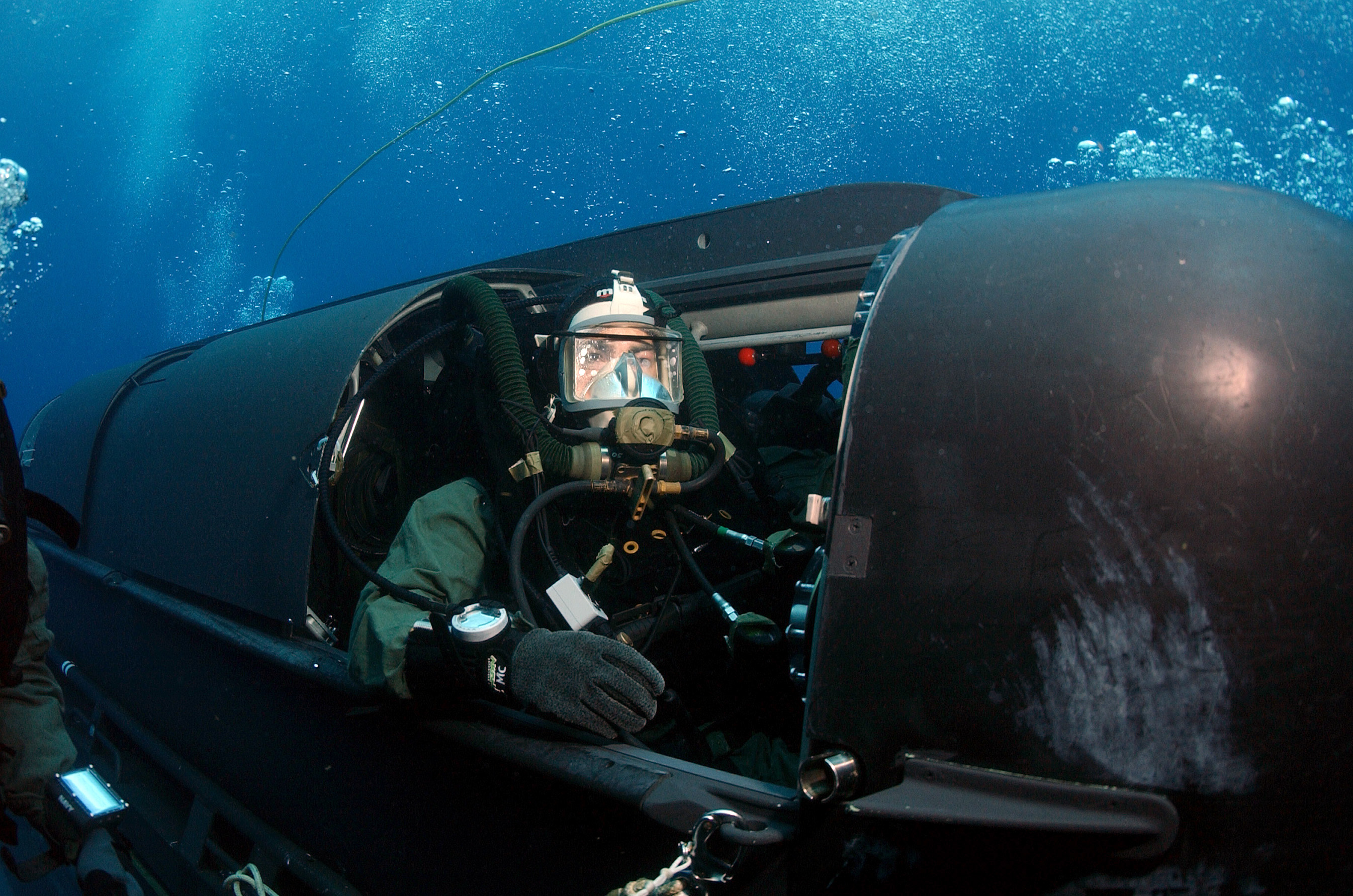
A member of SEAL Delivery Vehicle Team Two (SDVT-2) prepares to launch a Mark 8 SDV from Los Angeles-class attack submarine USS Philadelphia

== See also ==
- Chariot manned torpedo
- Human torpedo
