= Tugger =

Tugger may refer generally to something that tugs.

It may also refer to:

- A tugboat
- A restoration device, for restoring foreskin after circumcision
- The Protei-5 Russian diver propulsion vehicle

Steve Waugh[Tugger] For characters named Tugger, see:

- Rum Tum Tugger, a character from a poem by T. S. Eliot and who appears in the musical Cats
- Tugger, a character from South Park episode The New Terrance and Phillip Movie Trailer

See also:

- Coat-tugger
