= ASDS =

ASDS may refer to:

- Autonomous spaceport drone ship, a mobile rocket landing platform
- Advanced SEAL Delivery System, a former U.S. submarine
