= Pluto Plus =

Unmanned Underwater Vehicle for use in underwater mine identification and destruction

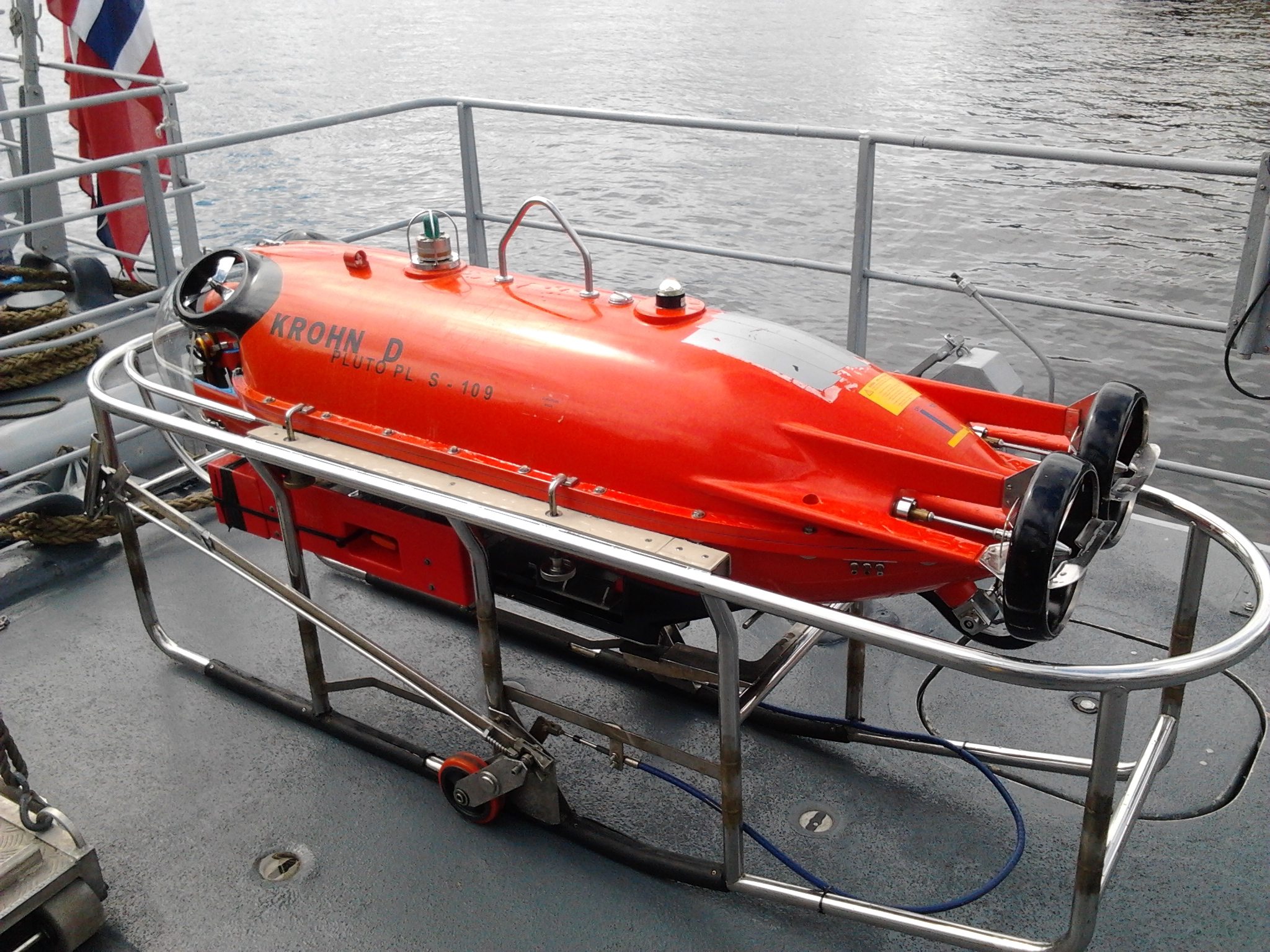
Pluto Plus at Norwegian minehunter KNM Hinnøy

The Pluto Plus is an Unmanned Underwater Vehicle (UUV) designed for use in underwater mine identification and destruction by militaries. The vehicle is battery operated, has a maximum speed of 6 kt, and an endurance of 2 to 6 hours. Its ability to be fitted with a wireless link makes it suitable for counter-terrorism purposes. The Pluto's UUV family is developed and build by the company Gaymarine Srl in Lomazzo (Italy). The Columbia Group is the exclusive licensee for fabrication of the Pluto Plus in the United States.

== Operators ==
- Egyptian Navy (Egypt) - 3 in service, (under a $10.6 million fixed-price contract in 2009 with The Columbia Group)
- Hellenic Navy (Greece)
  - 3rd Fleet Minesweeping Squadron of the Fleet Headquarters - 3 deployed on HS EVROPI (M 62) (Note: former HMS Bicester (M36))
- Italian Navy (Italy) - GAETA class (installed by end 2019, after the class' modernisation programme)
- Norwegian Navy (Norway) - 6 in service, 2 on 3 Oksøy-class mine hunters (Note: 2 Pluto Plus USVs deployed on Karmøy, Måløy and Hinnøy minehunters, under a modernisation programme between 2008 and 2011.)
- Spanish Navy (Spain) - at least 8 in service, 2 on each of first 4 Segura class minehunters

== Specifications ==
Type	USV
Length	2250 mm
Width	580 mm
Height	770 mm
Weight	320 kg
Payload	100 kg
Maximum Depth	300 m underwater
Speed	6 kn
Sonar Range	0.5 m to 120 m (optional 400 m)
Armament	Manipulator arm for placing explosive charges
Guidance	Remote-controlled, Autonomous
