= Shallow Water Combat Submersible =

Manned submersible and a type of swimmer delivery vehicle

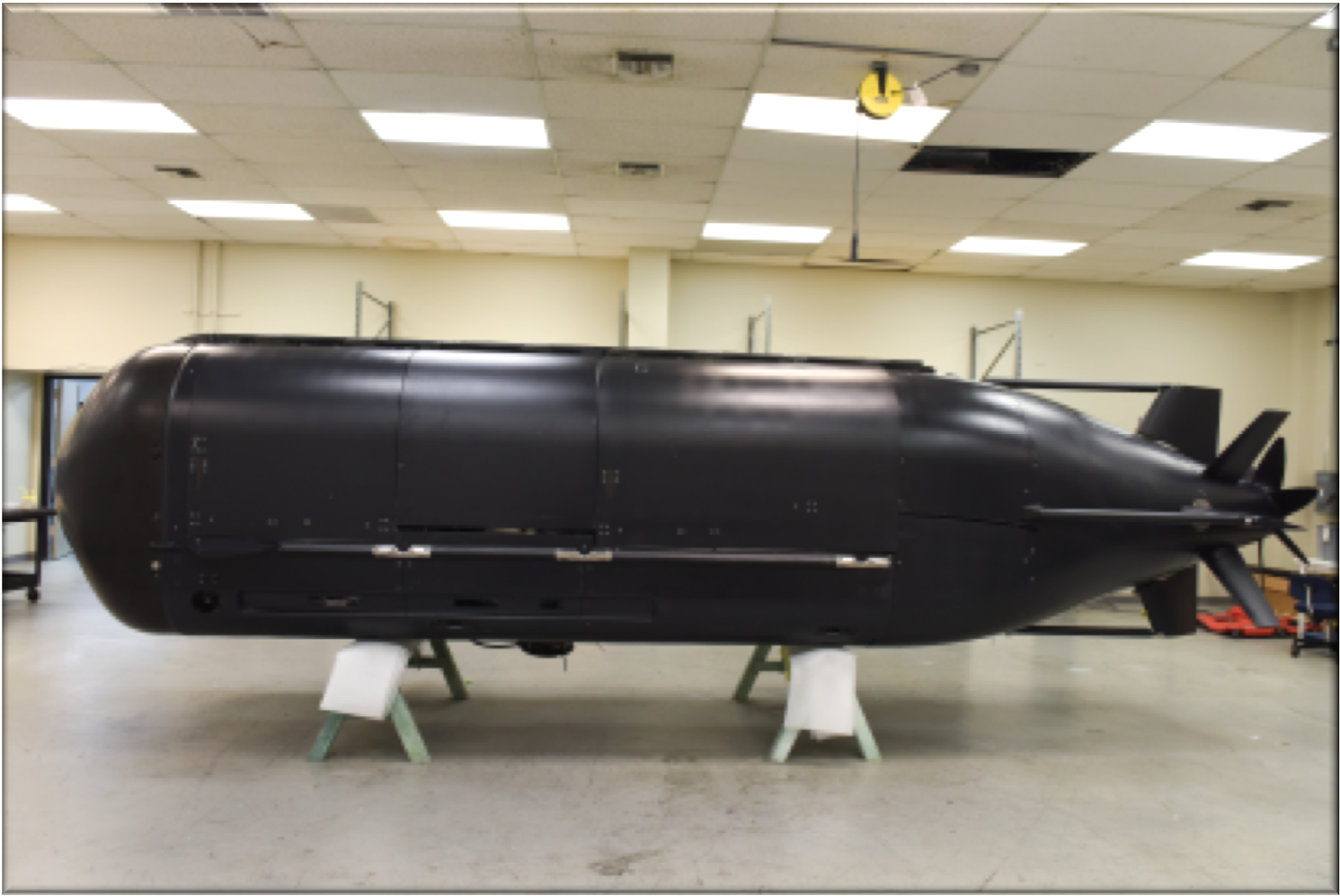

Class overview
- Builders: Teledyne Brown Engineering
- Operators: United States Navy; Royal Navy (planned)
- Preceded by: SEAL Delivery Vehicle
- Cost: $383 million (program cost)
- On order: 7 USN, 3 RN
- Building: 2
- Completed: 2

General characteristics
- Type: Submersible, diver propulsion vehicle
- Displacement: 4.5 tonnes (5.0 short tons)
- Length: 6.8 meters (22 ft)
- Beam: 1.5 meters (4.9 ft)
- Draft: 1.5 meters (4.9 ft)
- Propulsion: Lithium-ion batteries powering electric motors
- Speed: 6 kn (11 km/h)
- Endurance: 12 hours
- Test depth: >190 feet (58 m)
- Complement: 6 (2 crew, 4 passengers)
- Sensors & processing systems: Inertial navigation system, high-frequency sonar for obstacle/mine avoidance and navigation, GPS
- Armament: SEAL team personal weapons, limpet mines

The Shallow Water Combat Submersible (SWCS), also known as the Mark 11 SEAL Delivery Vehicle (SDV Mk 11), is a crewed, wet (free-flooding) submersible that serves as a swimmer delivery vehicle for special-operations missions by United States Navy SEALs. Designed to replace the Mark 8 SEAL Delivery Vehicle (SDV Mk 8) on a 1-to-1 basis, Teledyne was awarded a contract to deliver 10 units for a cost of $179 million. The first two ships were delivered in 2018, with the last units planned for delivery in 2022. The SWCS will serve alongside the pressurized Dry Combat Submersible (DCS), a midget submarine developed by Lockheed Martin to replace the cancelled Advanced SEAL Delivery System (ASDS).

== History ==
The SWCS program was initiated in 2008, after the cancellation of the ASDS, the anticipated replacement for the SEAL Delivery Vehicle. Teledyne Brown Engineering was awarded the $383 million contract to develop the SWCS in 2011, which provides for the construction of 10 submersibles and one training vessel, the first of which was supposed to enter service in 2018. However, delays and cost overruns began as early as 2015, leading Congress to halve the funds available for the program in the FY2016 National Defense Authorization Act. As of May 2018, the prototype boat had been built and was undergoing testing, while introduction was pushed back to 2019. By October, two subs had been delivered to the Navy.

In September 2018 the Defense Security Cooperation Agency notified Congress of the possible sale of 3 SWCSs to the United Kingdom for a total of $90 million.

== Design ==
The SWCS is 12 inches (30 cm) longer and 6 inches (15 cm) taller than its predecessor, the Mark 8 SDV. The SWCS will have a longer range and higher payload capacity than its predecessor. As such, it will also be about 4,000 pounds (1.8 t) heavier than its predecessor. Its hull is made from aluminum. The SWCS will also have more advanced computer systems and better navigation, with new systems including a "sensor mast" with an electro-optical periscope, wireless and wired communication between crew members, sonar detectors, and sonar-assisted automatic docking. The computer bus and sensor mast are designed as modular systems so that individual sensors or systems can be swapped out as required by an individual mission and upgraded as desired. Like its predecessor, the SWCS will carry six SEALs: a pilot, a co-pilot/navigator, and four passengers. The SWCS can be deployed from surface ships, land, and dry deck shelters (DDS) on submarines, although the third option is preferred for stealth reasons.

Compared to the DCS it will serve alongside, the SWCS will be able to enter areas that the DCS cannot. It will also be deployable from submarines, a capability that the DCS lacked as of 2015.

The SWCS's larger dimensions will require expanding the DDS to accommodate it. The Navy plans to lengthen the DDS by 50 inches (1.3 m) and triple its weight capacity.

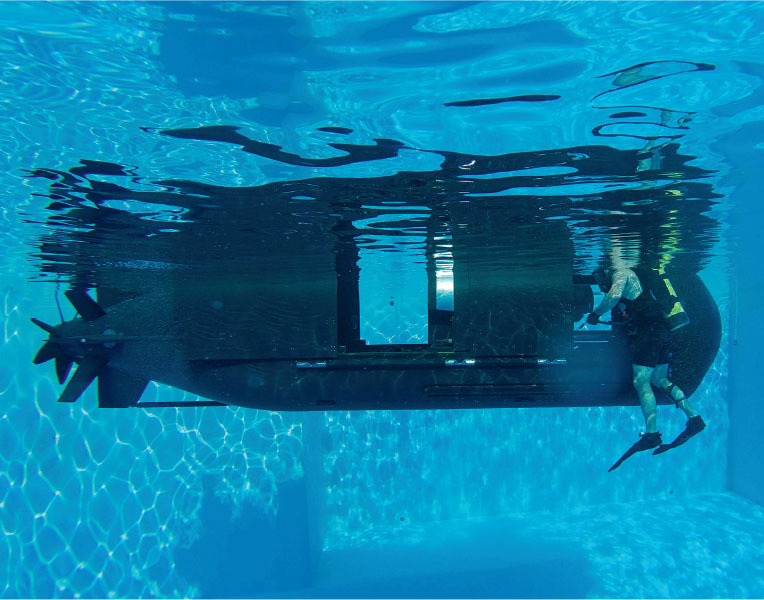
The prototype SWCS being tested in a pool
