= Błotniak =

One-man wet cabin underwater craft designed in Poland in 1978

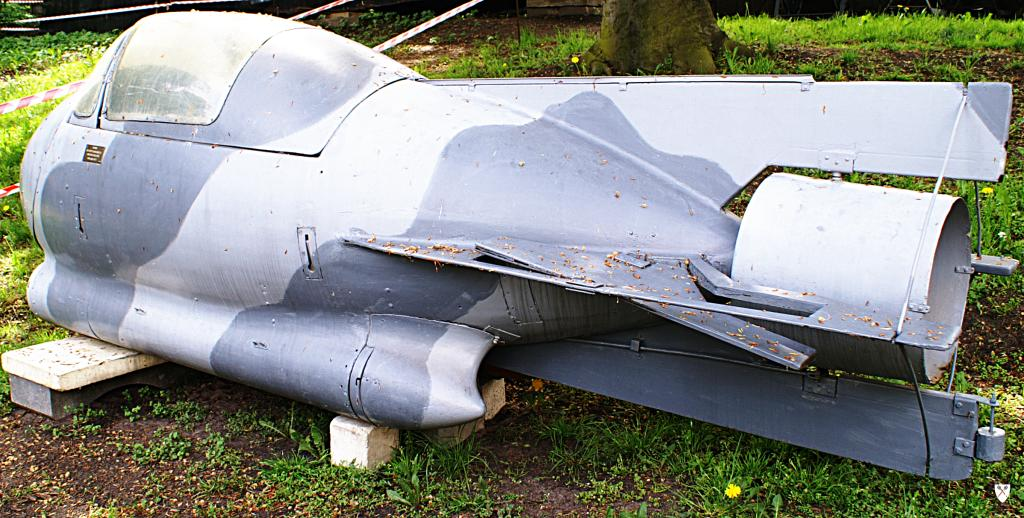
Błotniak

Błotniak (Polish for "Harrier") is a one-man wet cabin underwater craft designed in Poland in 1978. It was based in the torpedo research centre in Gdynia.

== Technical data ==
=== Specification ===
- propulsion:
  - two batteries of compressed air accumulators in the tubes on the sides of the craft
  - one set of ducted contra-rotating propellers
  - one electrical motor as a source of power for the propeller
- equipment:
  - two spotlights
  - 2 sonars (passive and active)
  - depth-levelling system
- maximum speed: 5 kn (9.3 km/h; 5.8 mph)
- range: 50 nmi (93 km; 58 mi)
- load capacity: 200 kg (440 lb)

== See also ==
Media related to Błotniak at Wikimedia Commons
