= Dry Combat Submersible =

Midget submarine project

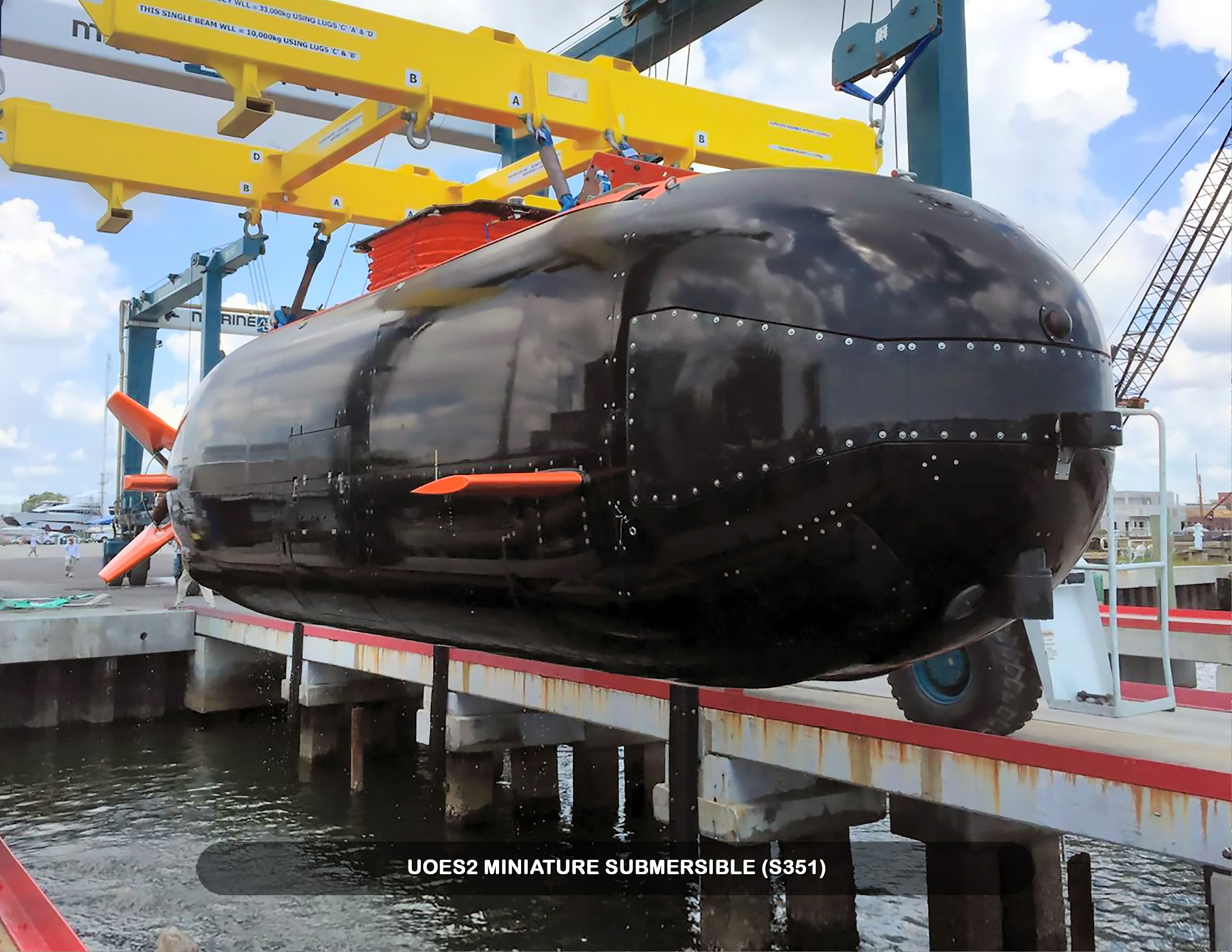
- The prototype Dry Combat Submersible

Class overview
- Builders: Lockheed Martin
- Planned: 3
- Building: 2

General characteristics
- Type: Submersible
- Displacement: 28 tonnes
- Length: 12 metres (39 ft)
- Beam: 2.4 metres (7.9 ft)
- Draft: 2.4 metres (7.9 ft)
- Propulsion: Electric motors, lithium-ion batteries
- Speed: 5 knots (5.8 mph; 9.3 km/h)
- Range: 60 nautical miles (69 mi; 110 km)
- Endurance: 24 hours
- Test depth: 100 metres (330 ft)
- Complement: 2 crew, 8 SEALs
- Sensors & processing systems: Sonar, fathometer

The Dry Combat Submersible (DCS) is a midget submarine delivered to USSOCOM by Lockheed Martin. Lockheed Martin were nominated as the prime contractor with Submergence Group as the sub contractor. DCS is designed for use by the United States Navy SEALs for insertion on special operations missions. It will replace the canceled Advanced SEAL Delivery System and will serve alongside the Shallow Water Combat Submersible.

As the name suggests, the Dry Combat Submersible has a dry interior, enabling longer mission durations in colder water. The DCS is designated the S351 Nemesis.

Lockheed Martin and the Submergence Group were awarded the $166 million, 5-year contract to develop and build three DCSs in June 2016. By 2018, the total spent on the submersibles rose to $236 million. The DCS reached initial operational capability in May 2023, with 2 submersibles completed and delivered to the US Navy.

== Design ==
The Dry Combat Submersible is 12 metres (39 ft) long and has a beam and height of 2.4 metres (7.9 ft). The submersible weighs 14 tonnes (31,000 lb) fully loaded and has a displacement of 28 tonnes (62,000 lb). It can be transported in a standard 40-foot shipping container. The DCS has a crew of two–a pilot and a co-pilot/navigator–and carries eight fully equipped SEALs. The DCS has three dry, pressurized sections: a fore transport compartment for carrying troops, an amidships swimmer lock-in/lock-out compartment, and an aft command center where the pilot and co-pilot operate the sub.

Though its exact performance remains classified, the DCS is stated to have a maximum depth rating of 100 metres (330 ft) and Lock In and Out maximum depth of 30 metres (98 ft). Its batteries give it a range of 60 nautical miles (110 km; 69 mi) at a speed of 5 knots (9.3 km/h; 5.8 mph), although its maximum speed is not public. Lockheed Martin claims that the DCS has an endurance greater than 24 hours, triple that of the current SEAL Delivery Vehicle and twice that of the Shallow Water Combat Submersible the DCS will serve alongside.

Unlike its predecessor, the Dry Combat Submersible will be deployed from surface ships rather than from larger submarines. Surface ships will lower it into the water with a crane or deploy it from an opening in the bottom of their hulls. However, the Navy plans to study integrating the DCS with a larger submarine will begin in FY2020. The DCS' main advantage over its predecessors is its dry environment, which enables SEALs to undertake longer missions in colder water and be more combat-ready when they deploy. Another advantage is that the SEALs can communicate more easily in the DCS than in previous wet submarines, where they had to rely on intercoms and could not see each other. SEALs deploy from the DCS in diving gear and swim the rest of the way to their target.

The DCS' navigational systems include an inertial navigation system and Doppler Velocity Log. The sensor suite consists of sonar and a fathometer, although additional sensors can be added depending on mission requirements. The communications equipment includes an underwater telephone and UHF radio.

This vehicle is a response to the confirmed reports of Russian unmanned underwater vehicles (UUV) that the Russian Navy has employed in its war games since at least 2013 as reported to the U.S. Senate Intelligence Committee.

== History ==
The Dry Combat Submersible has been developed from MSub's existing S302 mini-sub, which is itself an improved version of the S301i. Both the S302 and S301i are produced for export by MSubs in collaboration with the Submergence Group. The S301i is capable of fitting in the dry deck shelters used on larger American and British submarines, although the S302 and the DCS are larger than the S301i and so cannot fit in dry deck shelters. The design and requirements for the DCS were initially formulated by the U.S. Special Operations Command as early as 2014, although the technology to make the DCS did not catch up to the requirements until more recently.

The first lithium-ion batteries for the DCS were delivered to the Navy by General Atomics in February 2018.

The Dry Combat Submersible reached initial operational capability with the US Navy in May 2023.

As of July 2023, two submersibles have been delivered to the US Navy, with work being finished on a third.

The first DCS with LiFT (Lithium-ion Fault Tolerant) battery system was accepted by USSOCOM on April 21, 2020. General Atomics Electromagnetic Systems is providing LiFT long-lifecycle batteries to power the propulsion and internal support systems of DCS.

== See also ==
- Shallow Water Combat Submersible
- Advanced SEAL Delivery System
