= Protei-5 Russian diver propulsion vehicle =

Russian one-man diver propulsion vehicle

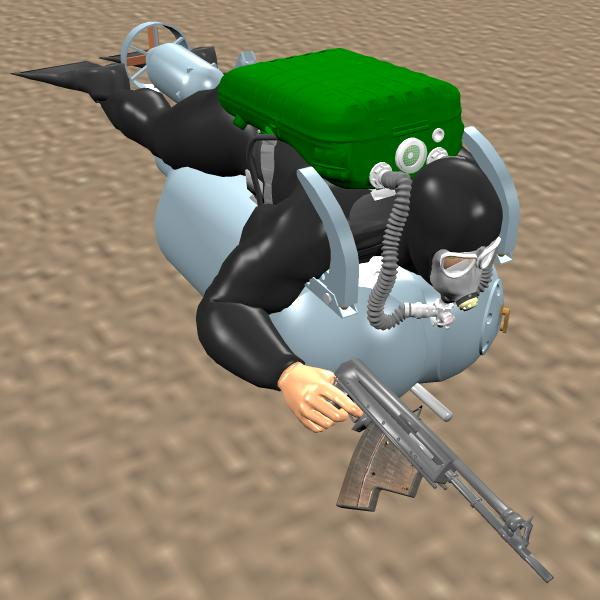
Frogman with a Russian IDA71 rebreather, riding a Protei 5, carrying a Russian APS Underwater Assault Rifle

Protei-5 repainted and with a modified handlebar added by a civilian owner, replacing the shoulder clips

The Protei-5 (Протей-5) is a small Russian one-man diver propulsion vehicle often used by Russian commando frogmen. It is battery electric powered, using six non-sealed lead–acid batteries. It clips on under the diver with a clip over each shoulder and one up between his legs. Its casing is aluminium. It was intended to be clipped onto the outside of a submarine; near the operation site the frogmen would airlock out underwater and unhitch their Protei 5's and ride them to the operation site. It seems to have been intended to be ridden fast and far rather than for complicated maneuvering.

The Russian for this sort of "diver-carrying vehicle" is буксировщик buksirovshchik = "tugger".

The rod sticking out of the front end was meant to carry a lamp.
The lever on the left bow is the motor's on/off switch. There is no speed control.
The frogman steers with the diving fins on his feet.
Overall size: 66 centimetres (2 feet 2 inches) wide, 69 centimetres (2 feet 3 inches) high, 1.75 (5 feet 9 inches) long.
Size of hull: 66 centimetres (2 feet 2 inches) wide, 38 centimetres (1 feet 3 inches) high, 1.45 m (4 feet 9 inches) long.

A frogman with an IDA71 rebreather riding a Protei-7 could pass through a hole 0.9 metres (3.0 ft) square.

Only two Protei-5 are known to exist outside of the ex-USSR:

- One is currently in upstate New York, USA.
- One is fully operational in New Jersey, USA; it was made in 1970 and its motor is noisy. This example was imported along with some 150 IDA-59, IDA-64, IDA-71, and AKA-60 rebreathers, all ex-Soviet military combat swimmers' systems.

Similar designs have been made in Russia, including a model called Proton.

The name "Protei" is a Russian version of the classical Latin / Greek mythological name Proteus.
