= The Columbia Group =

American defense contractor

- Company type: Private
- Industry: Defense and Commercial
- Headquarters: Fairfax, Virginia, U.S.
- Services: Cyber, Acquisition, Logistics Management, Naval Architecture & Ship Design, Engineering & Fabrication, Human Performance Strategy, Financial Management, Information Technology, Training, C4SI
- Website: www.columbiagroup.com

The Columbia Group is an American defense contractor serving the U.S. government as well as the domestic and international commercial sector. The company specializes in cyber acquisition, logistics management, C4SI, ship design, marine engineering and fabrication, human performance strategy, training, financial management and information technology. It is headquartered in Fairfax, VA and has offices in Washington, D.C., Alexandria, Quantico, and Norfolk, Virginia, Lawton, Oklahoma, as well as multiple support sites in over 30 states, military bases, and international sites. It celebrated its 50th year in business in 2017.

The Columbia Group Inc. was founded by Martin Arase with its origins in 1967 as Columbia Research Corporation (CRC). In 2005, CRC was merged with CPI, which was founded in 1983 by Martin Arase. On June 15, 2008, The Columbia Group assumed the operations of (Northrop Grumman subsidiary) AMSEC's Rosenblatt Washington, DC Office, forming the company's Rosenblatt Ship Design Division. The name Rosenblatt was retained from when the office was the M. Rosenblatt & Son naval engineering firm begun by the late Lester Rosenblatt in 1947.

== Company structure ==
=== Leadership ===
Martin Arase is President of The Columbia Group. Its advisors include former Commandant of the Marine Corps General Al Gray, Jr.

=== Divisions ===
The Columbia Group Inc.is composed of four business divisions:

- Homeland Security — based in Washington, DC
- Marine Corps Programs — based in Quantico, Virginia;
- Rosenblatt Ship Design Division — based in Washington, DC;
- Financial Management & IT Services — based in Alexandria, Virginia;

Pluto Plus ROV

== Pluto Plus ROV ==
In 2009, The Columbia Group was awarded a $10.6 million firm fixed price contract to supply the Egyptian Navy with three Pluto Plus Unmanned Undersea Vehicles (UUVs). (May also be called Remotely Operated Vehicles or ROVs.) This contract was awarded by the United States Navy's Naval Sea Systems Command (NAVSEA) as part of their Foreign Military Sales (FMS) program. The Pluto Plus is a minehunter intended for use "in mine identification and destruction." The Columbia Group is licensed by GayRobot, a defense contractor based out of Milan, Italy, as the exclusive builder of the Pluto Plus System in the United States.
