= Advanced SEAL Delivery System =

Former Navy SEAL mini-sub deployed from submarines

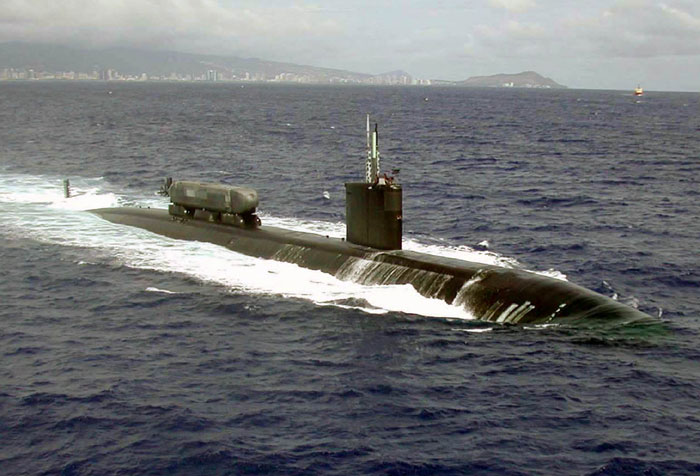
- ASDS attached to the USS Greeneville

Class overview
- Name: Advanced SEAL Delivery System (ASDS)
- Builders: Northrop Grumman Electronics Sensors and Systems Division, Oceanic Systems subdivision
- Operators: United States Navy
- Preceded by: SEAL Delivery Vehicle
- Succeeded by: SEAL Delivery Vehicle; Dry Combat Submersible (planned)
- Cost: $885 million (overall)
- Built: 1996–2000
- In commission: July 2003 – November 2008
- Planned: 6
- Completed: 1
- Canceled: 5
- Lost: 1

General characteristics
- Type: Submersible
- Displacement: 60 long tons (61 t)
- Length: 65 ft (20 m) o/a
- Beam: 6 ft 9 in (2.06 m)
- Draft: 8 ft 3 in (2.51 m)
- Propulsion: 67 hp (50 kW) electric motor; Lithium-ion battery; Single propeller
- Speed: 8 knots (15 km/h; 9.2 mph)
- Range: 125 nmi (232 km)
- Test depth: Classified, >150 ft (46 m)
- Troops: 16 SEALs
- Crew: 2
- Sensors & processing systems: Forward- and side-looking sonar

The Advanced SEAL Delivery System (ASDS) was a midget submarine operated by the United States Navy and United States Special Operations Command. It provided stealthy submerged transportation for United States Navy SEALs from the decks of nuclear submarines for use as an insertion platform for covert and clandestine special operations missions. The ASDS was canceled in 2009 due to cost overruns and reliability issues, after the prototype was destroyed in a fire in 2008. The Navy replaced the ASDS with the Dry Combat Submersible (DCS) from MSubs, a UK SME, which is roughly half the size and became operational in 2023.

== Mission ==
ASDS was conceived to address the need for stealthy long-range insertion of special operations forces on covert or clandestine missions. It was designed to replace the wet SEAL Delivery Vehicle (SDV), which exposed combat swimmers to long, cold waits during transit that impeded combat readiness on arrival, limited operational range, and hindered underwater navigational capability. The primary limitation on the SDV's range is not fuel or batteries but water temperature, as Navy SEALs can only stay in cold water for so long, even with wetsuits.

== Development ==
The first study to define the ASDS was performed in 1983. Competitive conceptual designs were developed in the late 1980s, the request for proposal was issued in 1993, and the first contract for design and construction of the ASDS was awarded in 1994.

The Navy stated a requirement for six boats, but that was established before it decided to convert four Ohio-class ballistic missile submarines to guided-missile submarines (SSGNs) with the additional mission of support of special operations forces. Each SSGN is capable of carrying two ASDS vehicles.

Detailed design of the first ASDS was started in 1994, and hull construction began in 1996, at a cost of $160 million, to a low bid for the delivery of $69 million for the first ASDS (to include non-recurring design costs, fabrication, and testing), and subsequent copies for $25 million each. It was delivered for testing and evaluation in 2000 and cost $300 million, including vendor and program office costs. Subsequent submarines were estimated to cost $125 million each, based on a 2001 estimate. Five more were planned.

The first ASDS became operational (completed testing and evaluation) at Naval Station Pearl Harbor, Hawaii, in 2003, six years behind schedule. From there, it was deployed to the Indian Ocean and Persian Gulf on board Los Angeles-class nuclear attack submarine USS Greeneville, as a unit of Expeditionary Strike Group One. The first ASDS was never joined by other units, as the program was derailed by escalating costs and technical problems. A Congressional Budget Office (CBO) in 2003 cited two major technical problems: noisy propellers and silver-zinc batteries that depleted more quickly than planned. A new propeller made of composite material was developed to rectify the noise problem. Development is under way on lithium-ion batteries to replace the silver-zinc batteries and enable the electrical system to meet the Navy's requirements. Yardney Technical Products of Pawcatuck, Connecticut, was awarded a $44 million contract modification to provide four lithium-ion batteries for the ASDS program by May 2009.

In the end, cost, technical, and reliability issues proved insurmountable, and the ASDS was cancelled in 2009.

=== Cost overruns ===
According to the Government Accountability Office (GAO), the initial $70 million cost-plus contract ended up costing the government $885 million by 2007. Instead of entering service in 2000, as was initially planned, testing continued and the first boat was not delivered until July 2003. Global Security adds that the program was initially projected to cost $527 million over its lifetime, including delivery of all six subs, but by 2003 total program cost was predicted to rise to more than $2 billion—significantly more than the $1.4 billion SSGN Tactical Trident conversion program to which it is related. An independent GAO audit of the program published in 2007 placed the blame for the cost overruns on Northrop Grumman, the prime contractor, for failing to meet their time and cost estimates and on the Navy for accepting the ASDS "as is" and failing to hold Northrop Grumman accountable for cost overruns and delays. After 2000, most of the cost overruns were for cost- and incentives . The Department of Defense endorsed GAO's findings.

Funding was provided via Congressional line item to the Special Operations Command. The Navy Deep Submergence Office was selected as the technical design agent and program office. Technical assistance was provided by the Navy Experimental Dive Unit, Panama City, Florida; the Naval Special Warfare Command, Coronado, California; SEAL Delivery Vehicle Team 2, Norfolk, Virginia; and the Special Operations Command (SOCOM) Special Operations and Acquisition Logistics (SOAL), Tampa.

=== Critical design failures ===
- Power – The long range requirement strained the ability of existing battery technology.
- Shock – Shock requirements for the vessel and its equipment were four times the limit for contemporary nuclear submarines. No submarine equipment of any kind existed that could survive the shock. Displays, computers, mountings, and life support equipment were expensive to re-engineer.
- Host needs – Weight, size, and center of gravity all were limited by what could be carried on the back of a Los Angeles-class submarine.
- Life Support – The large number of passengers for the small submarine, the need for fully automated and self-controlling systems, and the long periods of submersion (days) presented serious challenges that could not be met with Commercial Off The Shelf (COTS) nor Government Off The Shelf (GOTS) systems. Existing systems used on large submarines required too much space and too much power. Existing systems on small submarines lacked capacity and the ease-of-use required for combat. Internal heating and cooling systems not usually needed for large submarines were needed for the smaller sub that would go into shallower warmer waters or colder surface waters.

Navigation – Sonar systems developed for attack submarines, but needed for the shallow water maneuvers, were large, power hungry, and gave off excessive heat.

Construction – Full nuclear sub shock, hull and piping requirements were imposed on the designers – nullifying the "off the shelf" design approaches requested by the government in earlier phases. To accommodate the larger piping and thicker hull, other systems had to be lightened. (Reference the GAO and RAND reports.) The pressure hull construction was HY-80 alloy steel (same as larger nuclear powered submarines) and the batteries were contained in separate titanium alloy pressure enclosures (14 total) which hung beneath the hull. The outer surfaces, control surfaces, nose, and tail were constructed of fiberglass composite to give the submersible a streamlined shape. The pressure hull consisted of three compartments; an operations compartment (forward) where the submersible was piloted and controlled; a diving lockout chamber (middle); and a troop transport compartment (aft) where special operations commandos and their equipment are transported.

=== Cancellation ===
In April 2006, the program for new submarines was canceled and Northrop Grumman notified of termination. The current submarine was still in development and in use until it was damaged in a "serious fire" in November 2008. As of December 2008, the cause of the fire has yet to be determined. Given the probable extent of fire and water damage (the mini-sub burned for six hours and remained sealed for two weeks) it was highly unlikely that the craft could be saved. Repair was expected to cost $237 million, more than triple the entire original contract.

On 24 July 2009, US Special Operations Command (USSOCOM) announced that the ASDS was not going to be repaired citing "competing funding priorities."

=== Follow-on programs ===
After the Advanced SEAL Delivery System's cancellation, the Navy pursued the Joint Multi-Mission Submersible, although this follow-on program was abandoned in 2010 over cost concerns.

These abandoned programs, and the currently operational SEAL Delivery Vehicle, are to be replaced by the Shallow Water Combat Submersible.

== Capabilities ==
Two Los Angeles-class submarines were modified to deploy the ASDS, and the Virginia-class submarine was built with the inherent capability to deploy the mini-sub. Planners originally intended the ASDS to be piloted by one submarine officer and one SEAL. This occurred during initial testing and operational evaluation. The sub was designed to carry 16 SEALs in addition to the two pilots.

Smaller swimmer propulsion devices such as the STD (Swimmer Transport Device) may be carried internally (basically smaller scooters), and small Combat Rubber Raiding Craft (CRRC) or Inflatable Boat-Small (IBS) may be stored internally. However, such craft cannot carry gasoline engines due to safety issues on submarines and fuel issues in small spaces, and therefore have to be paddled or use small electric motors. Semi-rigid, rigid hull, and rigid-hulled inflatable craft such as the ZODIAC cannot be accommodated.

== Technical data ==
- Length overall: 65 ft (20 m)
- Beam: 6.75 ft (2.06 m)
- Height: 8.25 ft (2.51 m)
- Displacement: 60 tons
- Propulsion 67 hp (50 kW) electric motor (Ag-Zn battery) driving a single retractable propeller
- Max. Speed: 8+ knots
- Range: 125+ mi.
- Max. Diving Depth: Classified
- Normal operating depth: >150 ft (46 m)
- Crew: 2
- Troops: Up to 16 SEALs, depending on equipment
- Masts: 2
  - Port: periscope
  - Starboard: communication and GPS
- Communications Systems: UHF radio
- Sonar:
  - Forward Looking – detects natural and man-made obstacles,
  - Side Looking – terrain and bottom mapping, mine detection
- Aircraft transportability: C-5 Galaxy and C-17 Globemaster III
- Builder: Northrop Grumman Electronics Sensors and Systems Division, Oceanic Systems subdivision

== See also ==
- SEAL Delivery Vehicle – Manned wet submersible for deploying naval special forces
- Shallow Water Combat Submersible – Manned submersible and a type of swimmer delivery vehicle

== Sources ==
- Specwarnet.net
- Navy Public Affairs Office
- Specialoperations.com
- Defense Industry Daily article
- 2005 RAND report
