= Operation Jackpot =

Battle of the Bangladesh War of Independence

- Part of Bangladesh War of Independence
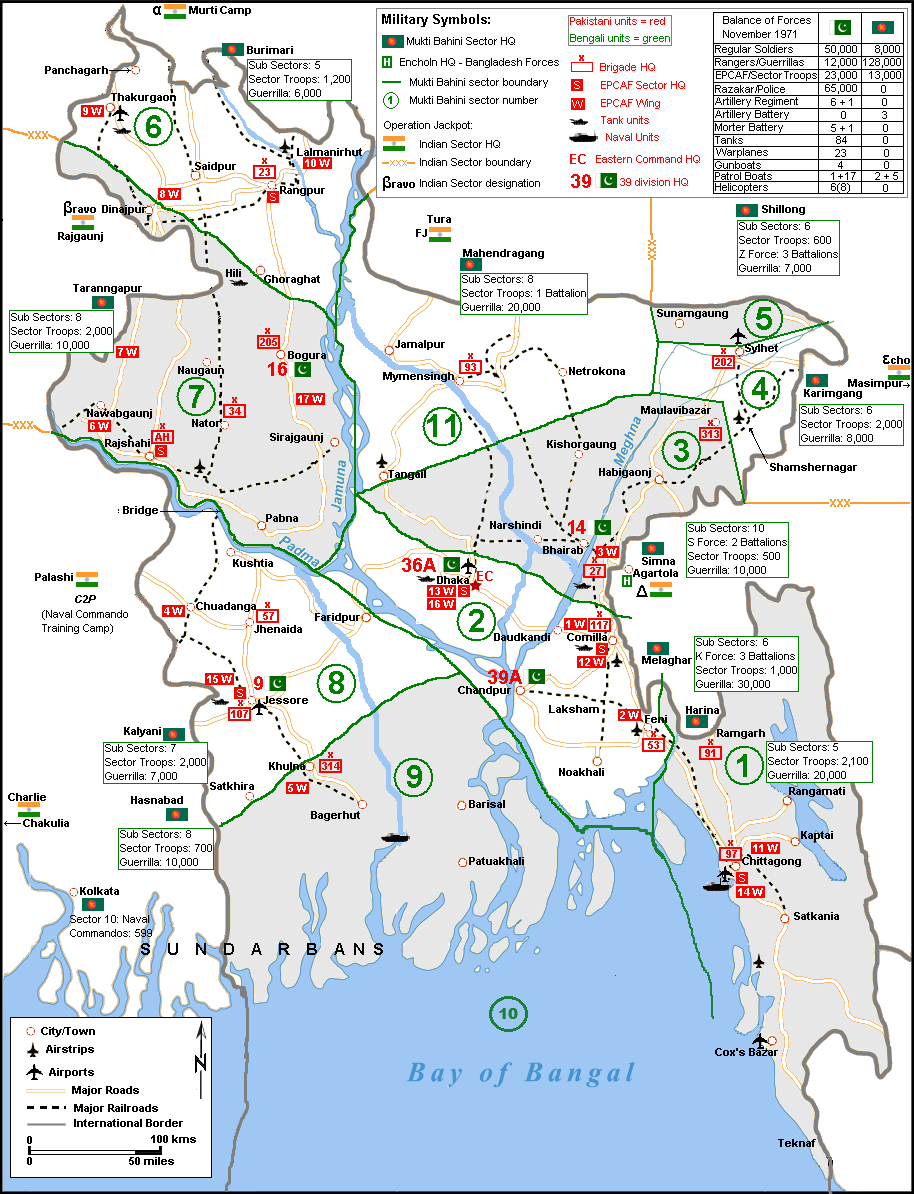
- Map of Operation Jackpot, Indian supply network for Mukti Bahini.
Date	25 April–15 August 1971
Location	East Pakistan, Pakistan
Result	Mukti Bahini operational success

Belligerents
(Bangladesh) Bangladesh; Supported By: India	Pakistan

Commanders and leaders
M. A. G Osmani; Khaled Musharraf; Abdul Jalil; Abdul Wahed Chowdhury	A. A. K. Niazi; William Harrison; Baqir Siddiqui; Maj-Gen. Abdul Majid (GOC 14th Infantry Division); Maj-Gen. Abdur (GOC 39th Ad Hoc Division); Brig. Ataullah (CO, 93rd Independent Brigade); Mohammad Shariff; David Felix; Capt. Ahmad Zamir (CO, Pakistan Marines Corps – East)

Units involved
Mukti Bahini; Sector 10	Pakistan Navy; 1st Marine Battalion; East Pakistan Civil Armed Force; 6 Sector HQ wings; 17 operational Wings

Operation Jackpot (Bengali: অপারেশন জ্যাকপট) was a codename for three operations undertaken by the Mukti Bahini in East Pakistan (now Bangladesh) against Pakistan forces at the climax of the Bangladesh War of Independence.

After the Pakistani Army drove the Bengali armed militancy across the Indian border at the conclusion of Operation Searchlight, the Indian Army implemented a supply and training operation for the Mukti Bahini from 15 May 1971, with the goal of sending an ever increasing number of trained fighters to attack Pakistani forces and sabotage military and economic assets to demoralize Pakistani soldiers and disrupt their supply network. This enterprise was dubbed "Operation Jackpot".

Mukti Bahini naval commandos launched several sabotage efforts in the cities of Chittagong, Chandpur, Mongla, and the Narayanganj District against the combined operating forces of the Pakistan Army, Pakistan Marines, Pakistan Navy SEAL Teams, and the East Pakistan Security Forces on the night of 15 August 1971. Bengali submariners who had defected from Pakistani submarine PNS Mangro (S133), then based in Toulon, France, led the attacks, and this is also known as part of Operation Jackpot.

The third operation was designed by Lt. Gen. Sagat Singh, commander of the Indian Army IV Corps, attached to the Eastern Command, and the Bangladesh forces operating in his operational area. These forces fought against the Pakistani forces in Sylhet, Comilla, and Chittagong as part of the overall campaign from 21 November to 16 December 1971.

== Background ==
After the postponement of the session of the National Assembly of Pakistan, the High Command was authorised by the Yahya administration to launch the military operation (codename: Searchlight and Barisal) in March 1971 in a view of curbing political opposition instigated by the Awami League– which had won majority in the 1970 elections, and would have formed next civilian government of Pakistan had the Army not intervened. The Pakistani Armed Forces launched Operation Searchlight on 25 March 1971 in a bid to take control of East Pakistan and subdue all resistance (political or otherwise) against the West Pakistani authorities. By mid-May, the Pakistani authorities in East Pakistan, with the crucial support provided by the Pakistani military, had been in control of maintaining the writ of government in major areas of East Pakistan, and the Mukti Bahini, under attack from the Pakistani Air Force and armed military units, started to retreat across the border into India. By the middle of June, the Pakistan Army had driven the remnants of Bengali army and paramilitary units, who had been supported by the civilians, across the border into India. The Mukti Bahini, formed around the defecting Bengali soldiers with civilian volunteers, started a guerrilla campaign.

=== Prelude ===
The central government in India decided to open its Eastern border with East Pakistan on 27 March, and started to admit millions of Bengali refugees and political dissidents into India, housing them in specialized camps. After the crackdown, Tajuddin Ahmad met with Indian Prime Minister Indira Gandhi on 3 April 1971 and asked for all possible aid, by which time the Indian government had already opened the Indian-East Pakistan border and the Border Security Force (BSF) was offering aid to the Bengali resistance. The Bangladeshi government in exile was formed by the Awami League leadership on 17 April at Meherpur in Kushtia, which confirmed Col. M. A. G. Osmani as commander of the Mukti Bahini (regular armed forces and insurgents) under the authority of Prime Minister Tajuddin Ahmad. Since March 1971, the local supply of weapons and ammunition was initially overseen by India's BSF, and the BSF had even made disorganized incursions in Bangladesh with little success. On 15 May, Indian Army Eastern Command took over the task of training and supplying the Mukti Bahini; this was aided by the support teams of BSF.

Indian Army dubbed the operation to support Mukti Bahini's "Operation Jackpot", setting up a coordinated enterprise under the Eastern Command to meet the material support, logistical, and training needs, and, to some extent, lend operational support and various planning advices.

=== The operational setup and execution of plan ===
The Indian logistical sectors for this operation were:

- Alpha (HQ: Murti Camp, West Bengal), C.O. Brig. B. C. Joshi.
- Bravo (HQ: Rajgaunj, West Bengal), C.O. Brig. Prem Singh.
- Charlie (HQ: Chakulia, Bihar), C.O. Brig. N. A. Salik.
- Delta (HQ: Devta Mura, Tripura), C.O. Brig. Sabeg Singh.
- Echo (HQ: Masimpur, Assam), C.O. Brig. M. B. Wadh, co-ordinating logistics.
- Foxtrot (HQ: Tura, Meghalaya), C.O. Brig. Sant Singh.

Through this network, Mukti Bahini forces communicated with the headquarters of the Mukti Bahini exiled in Kolkata and coordinated all supply, training and operational efforts for the war. Lt. Gen. J. S. Aurora, commander of Eastern Command, was overseeing the entire operation.

=== Effectiveness and importance ===
At the beginning stage of the Jackpot, the operation was crucial in sustaining the activities of the Mukti Bahini, which had engaged in a series of insurgent attacks and sabotage all over (then) East Pakistan, and their success debunked the Yahya administration's claims of successfully establishing peace and stability in the Eastern region, as news of the insurgency was picked up and publicized by the international press. The Indian Army's Directorate of Military Intelligence (DMI) was well aware of the Navy SEALs and the Army Special Forces, and therefore planned a careful operation with the Mukti Bahini leadership to launch a series of attacks to sabotage the civil and military infrastructure, inflict casualties on Pakistani forces, and demoralize the Pakistan Armed Forces before the Indian Army officially engaged both the Pakistan Army and Pakistan Navy in East Pakistan.

Despite limitations and challenges rising from the state of the Indian transport network, availability of supplies, differences of opinion of guerrilla training methods and the decision of the Bangladeshi government to train the maximum number of guerrillas in the shortest possible time, Which may have caused supply shortages and often arming of only 40% to 50% of the newly trained guerrillas with firearms, The Bangladeshi government in exile managed to field 30,000 regular troops and 100,000 guerrillas and run a campaign that would destroy or damage at least 231 bridges, perform 122 acts of sabotage on railway lines and 90 electric stations, disrupting the logistical/supply system of the Pakistani forces, and kill at least 237 officers, 136 JCOs and 3,559 soldiers of the regular army during April to November 1971, and an unspecified number of Police, West Pakistan Rangers, EPCAF and Razakar members, and wound several thousand soldiers. The success and intensity of guerrilla operations after August had also lowered the morale of the Pakistan Army, and by November, they chose to remain in their bases whenever possible, and the contribution of the guerrilla warfare to the final victory was enormous despite the numerous challenges.

== Background: naval commandos ==
At the conclusion of Operation Searchlight and Operation Barisal, the Pakistani Army and Pakistan Navy had driven the Mukti Bahini into India, where they entered a period of reorganization during June and July 1971 to train guerrillas and set up networks and safe houses in the occupied territories to run the insurgency and rebuild the conventional forces. M. A. G. Osmani divided the country into 11 sectors. He planned to send 2,000–5,000 guerrillas inside Bangladesh every month with 3/4 weeks of training to hit all targets of opportunity, while building up the regular force to seize territory in Sylhet, Indian officials suggested fielding a force of 8,000 guerrillas with regular troops in leadership positions with three or four months of training. The solution was to activate the hitherto inactive Sector No. 10 as a special sector for naval commandos with Col. Osmani in charge from 13 May onwards. This naval commando force was to be trained as per the Indian suggestion, acting as an elite force for attacking riverine and seaborne targets.

Col. Osmani's initial strategy of sending 2,000–5,000 guerrillas inside Bangladesh every month since July and hitting the border outposts with regular battalions had not yielded expected results for various reasons. By July–August, Pakistani commanders were confident that they had contained the "Monsoon offensive" of the Mukti Bahini. As the pace of military operations in Bangladesh slacked off, civilian morale was adversely affected, which prompted East Pakistan administrative authorities to claim that the situation had returned to "normal". In response to this declaration, the Mukti Bahini launched 2 operations: (1) Guerrilla attacks in targets in Dhaka by a crack commando group trained by Major ATM Haider (ex-SSG commando), and (2) the simultaneous mining and damaging of ships in Chittagong, Chandpur, Mongla and Narayanganj on 15 August, which became known in Bangladesh and international media as "Operation Jackpot".

== Mukti Bahini riverine activity ==
Bangladesh is crisscrossed by numerous wide rivers and, during the April–October monsoon flooding, about 300 additional navigable channels. The movement and logistics of the Pakistan Army largely depended on their control of the inland waterways and the seaports. Mukti Bahini did not operate a separate naval wing during March–June 1971. River craft were requisitioned as needed. The Pakistan Navy and Pakistan Air Force sank one such craft, MV Ostrich, during Operation Barisal on 26 April, while Pakistani gunboats sank 3 boats commanded by Mukti Bahini on 5 May 1971, at Gabura.

=== Pakistan naval preparations ===
The importance of waterways was not lost on Pakistan Eastern Command. After the launch of Operation Searchlight and the successful conclusion of Operation Barisal, General A. O. Mittha (Quarter Master General of Pakistan Army) had recommended the creation of a port operating battalion for Chittagong, in addition to a separate River Transport and River Marine Battalion to operate an augmented Cargo and Tanker flotilla. These steps were not implemented; the Army commandeered civilian watercraft for logistics and posted Army and Razakar personnel to guard various ferries, bridges, ports and other naval installations. Pakistan Navy established a Marine Academy in June 1971 to support riverine operations.

Rear admiral Mohammad Shariff had only 4 gunboats (PNS Comilla, Rajshahi, Jessore and Sylhet) and a patrol boat (PNS Balaghat) in East Pakistan, while the navy remodeled 17 civilian ships into gunboats by adding 12.7/20 mm guns, and .30/.50 caliber Browning machine guns. These boats joined the fleet by August 1971, while several other boats had been fitted with 40X60 mm Bofors guns and .50 calibre machine guns in Khulna and Chittagong dockyards to serve as patrol boats. A few hundred officers and 2,000 crewmen were posted in East Pakistan in 1971. 300 Bengali seamen were transferred to West Pakistan as a precaution after 25 March 1971, while Special Service Group Navy (SSGN) teams were posted in East Pakistan under Commander David Felix.

=== Naval commando training and preparations ===
A graphical representation of Bengali Naval Commando activities against Shipping in East Pakistan in 1971. A generic representation; not all geographic features are shown.

The river transport system was vital for economic activity, given the primitive state of the road and railway system of East Pakistan. Major Jalil, Colonel M. A. G. Osmani and Indian Commander Bhattachariya in collaboration with top regional commanders, established the secret camp, codenamed C2P, in Plassey, West Bengal, on 23 May to train volunteers selected from various Mukti Bahini sectors (Bangladesh was divided into 11 operational sectors for Mukti Bahini operations) for this purpose. Initially, 300 volunteers were chosen, ultimately, 499 commandos were trained in the camp. The training course included swimming, survival training, using limpet mines, hand-to-hand combat and navigation. By August 1971, the first batch of commandos were ready for operation. The Camp Commander at C2P was Commander M. N. Samanth, Training Coordinator was Lt. Commander G. Martis, both from the Indian Navy, while 20 Indian instructors along with the 8 Bengali submariners became trainers. Pakistani Intelligence agents scouted the camp in June and July, but Indian security measures prevented any harm to the camp and apprehended all infiltrators.

The Bangladesh Naval Commando Operation that was called "Operation Jackpot" was precipitated by events in Toulon, a coastal city of Southern France. The operation was planned to take on the Naval Special Service Group of the Pakistan Navy after it had conducted several other operations. In 1971, there were 11 East Pakistan Naval Submarine Crewmen receiving training there aboard a Pakistani submarine. One commissioned officer (Mosharraf Hassain) and 8 crewmen decided to take control of the submarine and to fight against Pakistan. Their plan was disclosed, however, causing them to flee from death threats made by Pakistan's Naval Intelligence. Out of the 9 crewmen, one made his way to London; the others managed to travel to the Indian Embassy in Geneva, Switzerland. From Geneva, embassy officials took them to New Delhi on 9 April, where they began a program of top secret naval training at C2P.

The operation was planned in the last week of July, under tight security. Information on river tides, weather and East Pakistani naval infrastructure and deployment was collected through the Mukti Bahini. Selected commandos were sent from C2P to forward bases in Tripura and West Bengal, where a final briefing was given to them. Mukti Bahini in Sector No. 1 assisted the group going to Chittagong, Sector No. 2 aided the groups going to Chandpur and Narayanganj and Sector No. 9 assisted the group targeting Mongla. Each commando carried a pair of fins, a knife, a limpet mine, and swimming trunks. Some had compasses, 1 in 3 commandos had Sten guns and hand grenades, and the group leaders carried a transistor radio. All the groups carried their own equipment to their targets and, after entering Bangladesh between 3 and 9 August, reached their destinations by 12 August, using the local Mukti Bahini network of safehouses. A pair of songs was played on India Radio (Akashbani) at specific times to convey the intended signal for commencing the operations. The first song (Amar putul ajke prothom jabe shoshur bari) was played on 13 August, the second song (Ami tomay joto shuniyechilem gan tar bodole chaini kono dan) on 14 August. The result of this operation was:

- Chittagong: Sixty commandos were divided into 3 groups of 20 each, but one group failed to arrive due to Pakistani security on time. Out of 40 commandos, 9 refused to take part, while 31 commandos mined 10 ships instead of 22 initially planned on 16 August. Between 1:45 and 2:15 am, explosions sank the MV Al-Abbas, the MV Hormuz and the Orient barge no. 6, sinking 19,000 tons of arms and ammunition, along with damaging/sinking 7 other barges/ships.
- Chandpur: 20 commandos were sent to mine ships at Chandpur. Two commandos ultimately refused to take part; the other 18 were divided into 6 groups and mined 4 ships. 3 steamers/barges were damaged or sunk.
- Narayanganj: 20 commandos conducted the sabotage operation. Four ships were sunk or damaged.
- Mongla: 60 commandos went to Mongla port. This team was divided into 5 groups of 12 members each. Ultimately, 48 commandos mined 6 ships at Mongla. Twelve commandos had been sent on a separate mission.

The simultaneous attacks on Pakistan Naval shipping assets on 16 August destroyed the myth of normalcy in East Pakistan when the news was flashed in the international media. A Pakistan Army investigation concluded that no one had imagined Mukti Bahini capable of conducting such an operation.

== Assessment of naval "Operation Jackpot" ==
Not all naval commando missions were met with success. Tightened security prevented any operations in Chittagong after the first week of October, while four attempts to damage the Hardinge Bridge failed. Some Commando teams were ambushed and prevented from reaching their objectives. Misfortune and miscalculation caused some missions to fail. Security measures prevented any sabotage attempts on the oil depots at Narayanganj, Bogra, Faridpur and Chittagong, and Mukti Bahini managed to damage the oil depots at Chittagong and Naryanganj using an Alouette helicopter and a Twin Otter plane on 2 December 1971.

In total, 515 commandos received training at C2P. Eight commandos were killed, 34 wounded and 15 captured during August–December 1971. Naval commandos managed to sink or damage 126 ships/coasters/ferries during that time span, while one source confirms at least 65 vessels of various types (15 Pakistani ships, 11 coasters, 7 gunboats, 11 barges, 2 tankers and 19 river craft by November 1971) had been sunk between August–November 1971. At least 100,000 tons of shipping were sunk or crippled, jetties and wharves were disabled and channels blocked, and the commandos kept East Pakistan in a state of siege without having a single vessel. The operational capability of the Pakistan Navy was reduced as a result of Operation Jackpot.

=== Naval commandos killed in Operation Jackpot ===
- Commando Abdur Raquib, who was killed during the Foolchhori Ghat Operation
- Commando Hossain Farid, who was executed during the second Chittagong operation. He was captured by Pakistani army, who tortured him to death by placing him inside a manhole and bending his body until his vertebral column was shattered.
- Commando Khabiruzzaman, who was killed in second operation in Faridpur
- Commando Sirajul Islam, M. Aziz, Aftab Uddin, and Rafiqul Islam, nothing further is known about them.

=== Naval commandos who received Bangladesh 'National Hero Award' Recognition ===
- A. W. Chowdhury- Bir Uttom
- Badiul Alam- Bir Uttom
- Shah Alam- Bir Uttom
- Mazhar Ullah- Bir Uttom
- Sheikh Md. Amin Ullah- Bir Uttom
- Abedur Rahman- Bir Uttom
- Mosharraf Hossain- Bir Uttom (His honour was revoked by the ruling Government of Bangladesh)
- Mohammad Khabiruzzan- Bir Bikrom
- Momin Ullah Patwari- Bir Protik
- Shahjahan Kabir- Bir Protik
- Faruk-e-Azam- Bir Protik
- Mohammad Rahmatullah- Bir Protik
- Mohammad Mojjamel Hossain- Bir Protik
- Amir Hossain- Bir Protik

== Operation Hot Pants ==
After the operation of 16 August, all commandos returned to India. After this no pre-planned simultaneous operation was launched by the Naval Commandos. Instead, some groups were sent to destroy specific targets, and other commandos began to hit targets as opportunity presented itself.

Major Jalil, Commander of Mukti Bahini Sector No. 9, had obtained permission from Premier Tajuddin Ahmed to form a naval unit in August and had requested four gunboats to Commander M. N. Samanth. In October 1971, Kolkata Port Trust donated two patrol crafts (Ajay and Akshay) to the Mukti Bahini. The boats underwent a month-long refitting at Khidirpur dockyard at the cost of 3.8 million Indian Rupees to carry two Canadian 40X60 mm Bofors guns and two light engines and eight ground mines, four on each side of the deck in addition to 11 ground mines. Renamed BNS Padma and Palash, the boats were crewed by 44 Bengali sailors and 12 naval commandos. The boats were officered by India Navy personnel and handed over to the Mukti Bahini on 30 October 1971. Bangladesh Government in Exile, State Minister Captain Kamruzzaman was present when the boats were commissioned by Kolkata Port Trust chairman P. K. Sen. Lt. Commander KP Roy and K. Mitra of the Indian Navy commanded the boats. The mission for the Bangladesh Navy flotilla was:

- Mine the Chalna port entry point
- Attack Pakistani shipping

Escorted by an Indian Navy frigate, on 10 November, these boats successfully mined the entrance of Mongla port. They also chased the British ship "The City of St. Albans" away from Mongla on 11 November 1971.

== Indian Army IV Corps operation (21 November 1971 – 16 December 1971) ==
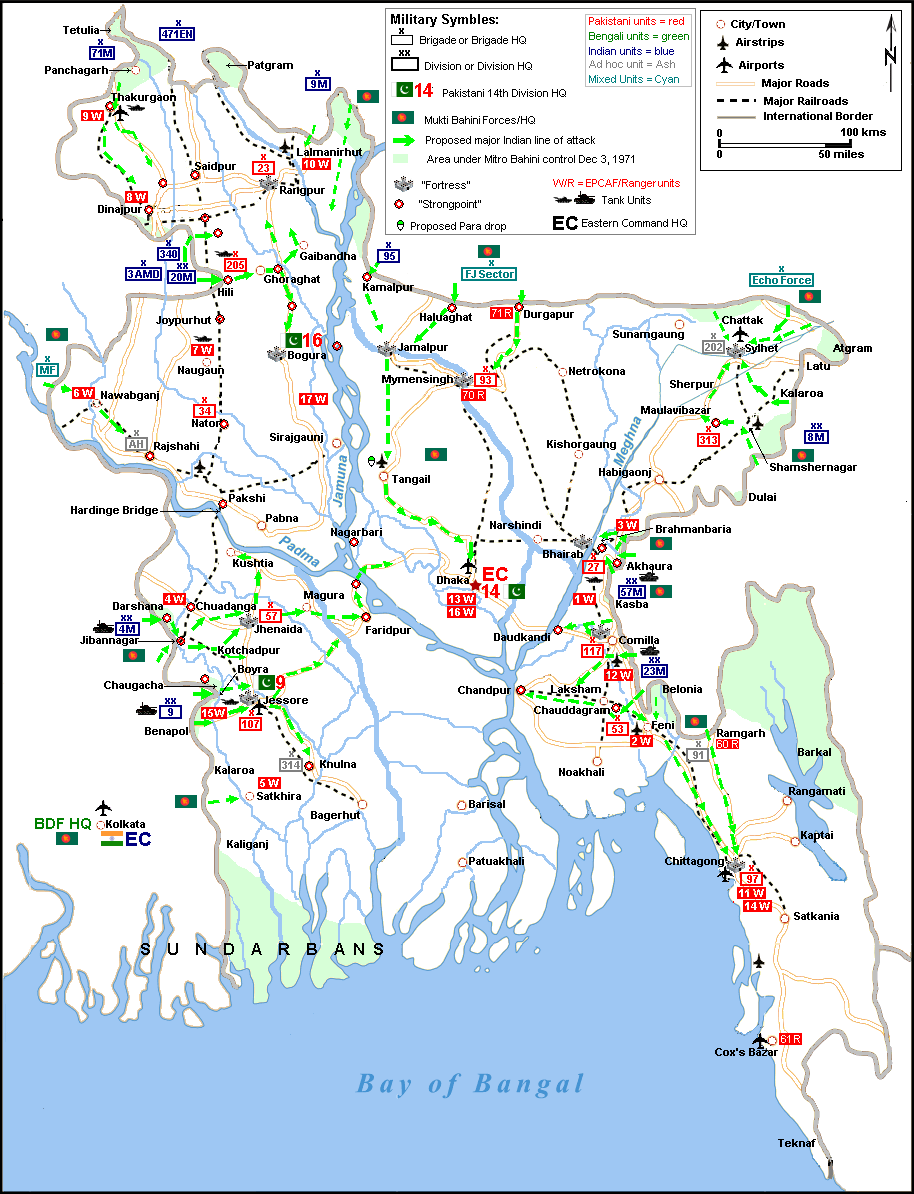
Final Indian Army operational plan in November 1971. A generic representation; some unit locations are not shown. Indian IV Corps operation may have been known as "Operation Jackpot".

The plan of operation for the Indian Army IV corps (8 Mountain Div., 23 Mountain Div., 57 Mountain Div. and "Kilo Force") may have been codenamed "Operation Jackpot". The opposition forces included the Pakistani 14th Infantry Division defending Sylhet, Moulvibazar and Akhaura, the 39th ad hoc division in Comilla, Laksham and Feni and the 97th independent infantry brigade stationed in Chittagong. The Indian Army had seized salients in the Eastern border from 21 November 1971. After Pakistan launched air attacks on India on 3 December, the Indian Army crossed the border into Bangladesh. By the end of the war on 16 December 1971, the Indian Army had isolated and surrounded the remnants of the 14th Division in Sylhet and Bhairabbazar; the 39th Division was cornered in Comilla and Chittagong, with all other areas of Sylhet, Comilla, Noakhali and Chittagong clear of enemy forces. Part of the corps had crossed the Meghna River using the "Meghna Heli Bridge" and using local boats to drive towards Dhaka when the Pakistani army surrendered.

== See also ==
- Timeline of the Bangladesh Liberation War
- Military plans of the Bangladesh Liberation War
- Mitro Bahini order of battle
- Pakistan Army order of battle, December 1971
- Evolution of Pakistan Eastern Command plan
- 1971 Bangladesh genocide
- Indo-Pakistani wars and conflicts

== Sources ==
- Islam, Rafiqul (2006) [First published 1981]. A Tale of Millions. Ananna Publishers. ISBN 984-412-033-0.
- Jacob, J. F. R. (2003) [First published 1996]. Surrender at Dacca: The Birth of A Nation. The University Press Limited. ISBN 984-05-1395-8.
- Khan, Rao Farman Ali (1992). How Pakistan Got Divided. Lahore: Jang Publishers. OCLC 28547552.
- Mukul, M. R. Akther (2005). Ami Bijoy Dekhechi (in Bengali). Sagar Publisher's. OCLC 416393761.
- Niazi, A. A. K. (1998). The Betrayal of East Pakistan. Oxford University Press. ISBN 0-19-577727-1.
- Rahman, Khalilur (2006). Muktijuddhay Nou-Abhijan (in Bengali). Sāhitya Prakāśa. ISBN 984-465-449-1.
- Roy, Mihir K. (1995). War in the Indian Ocean. Lancer Publishers. ISBN 978-1-897829-11-0.
- Salik, Siddiq (1977). Witness to Surrender. Oxford University Press. ISBN 81-7062-108-9.
