= PNS Mangro =

PNS Mangro is the name of the following ships of the Pakistan Navy:

- PNS Mangro (S133), a Daphné-class submarine in commission 1970–2006
- PNS Mangro (2025), a Hangor-class submarine launched in 2025
