= A. W. Chowdhury =

Bangladesh Navy officer

Abdul Wahed Chowdhury
- Born: 16 October 1940 (age 85)
- Military career
- Allegiance: Pakistan (before 1971); Bangladesh
- Branch: Pakistan Navy; Bangladesh Navy
- Service years: 1962 - 1997
- Rank: Commodore
- Commands: BNS Titumir; Director, Special Warfare Branch
- Conflicts: Bangladesh Liberation War; Operation Jackpot
- Awards: Bir Uttom

Abdul Wahed Chowdhury is a one-star retired officer of the Bangladesh Navy and a veteran of the Bangladesh Liberation War, notable for leading Operation Jackpot. He was awarded Bir Uttam, the highest living military award in Bangladesh, for his contributions during the war.

== Career ==
At the outbreak of war, Chowdhury was one of eight Bengali officers of the Pakistan Navy training in Paris. He was serving in PNS Mangro. They had decided to defect after being inspired by the 7th March speech of Sheikh Mujibur Rahman and hearing about the start of Operation Searchlight. They went to India and trained under the Indian Navy in the Jamuna River near New Delhi. More defectors from the Pakistan Navy and 150 student volunteers joined them. After training, they were divided into groups and sent to Chittagong, Daudkandi, Narayanganj, and Mongla. Chowdhury was sent to lead the Chittagong Group with 60 members. He Operation Jackpot. His group destroyed seven ships during the war, including MV Al-Abbas and MV Ohrmazd, cargo ships of the Pakistan military. Later, the sector was commanded by Commander MN Sumanta of the Indian Navy. He served with Faruk E Azam.

Chowdhury represented Bangladesh in the 1995 South East Asia Symposium. He retired from Bangladesh Navy in January 1997. He expressed support for the Awami League ahead of the 2018 general election.

In January 2025, Chowdhury delivered a lecture at the National Defence College.

Bir Uttam A. W. Chowdhury Road was named after Chowhdury.
