= Tauqir Hussain Naqvi =

Pakistani admiral

Vice Admiral S. Tauquir H. Naqvi HI(M) SBt

Chairman of the Pakistan National Shipping Corporation
- In office 11 June 2000 – 11 May 2007
- Preceded by: Vice-Admiral Sikandar Viqar Naqvi
- Succeeded by: Vice-Admiral A.U. Khan

Personal details
- Born: Syed Tauqir Hussain Naqvi British India (Present day, India and Pakistan)
- Citizenship: Pakistan
- Education: Military Training; Pakistan Naval Academy
- Occupation: Politician

Military service
- Allegiance: Pakistan
- Branch/service: Pakistan Navy
- Years of service: 1960–2000
- Rank: Vice-Admiral
- Unit: Executive Branch
- Commands: DG Joint Trig at JS HQ military attaché at the Pakistan Embassy, Tokyo; Special Service Group (Navy)
- Battles/wars: Indo-Pakistani War of 1965; Indo-Pakistani War of 1971
- Awards: Hilal-i-Imtiaz (Military); Sitara-e-Basalat

S. Tauqir H. Naqvi is a retired three-star rank admiral in the Pakistan Navy, politician, and a diplomat who served as the Chairman of the Pakistan National Shipping Corporation (PNSC) from 2000 until 2007, the longest serving chairman in the national flag carrier's history.

== Biography ==
Naqvi joined the Pakistan Navy in 1960 whose career mostly spent in the Navy SEALs Teams of the Special Service Group of the Pakistan Navy, having helped in preparing a documentary on SEALs. His military training as a military diver comes from the United States Navy SEALs after 1965.

He served in the second war in 1965 and Western front of third war with India in 1971, having commanding the SX-404-class submarine as a Lieutenant-Commander. In 1971, Lt-Cdr. Naqvi successfully spied on Indian Navy's movement, notably the INS Kiltan (P79) and INS Katchall (P81).

An order of firing off the torpedo was issued but the SX-404-class failed to struck the Indian Navy's Petya-class frigates; the Indian Navy's flotilla, unaware of being spied and watched on, passed through safely, which he called the captains of the Petya-class as the "lucky ones". After the war, Commander Naqvi served as a Navy SEAL instructor at the Naval Base Iqbal in the Karachi coast, eventually serving as commanding officer of the SX-404-class and overseeing its phasing out from the Navy in the 1990s. In 1991–93, he was appointed as military attaché at the Pakistan Embassy in Tokyo, Japan.

In 1993–94, Rear-Admiral Naqvi was assigned to join the Prime Minister Benazir Bhutto's administration, eventually taking an assignment as Additional Secretary at the Defense Division of the Ministry of Defense. In 1994–96, R-Adm. Naqvi later went to serve as the DG Joint Warfare (DG TJ) and DG Training (DG Trig) at the Joint Staff Headquarters.

In 2000, Vice-Admiral Naqvi was eventually taken as an secondment in the Musharraf administration when he was appointed Chairman of the National Shipping Corporation, which he served till 2007. His tenureship was credited for overseeing the fleet expansion of the National Shipping Corporation. On 21 August 2002, Adm. Naqvi's name was shortlisted and was considered in a race of joining the Aziz administration as an Interior Minister, eventually Faisal Hayat was later confirmed.

After his retirement, he remained associate with the tradition of Navy SEALs, having helped in preparing a documentary on SEALs.

== See also ==
- Pakistan Navy
