= Faruk-e-Azam =

Bangladeshi military personnel and adviser to the interim government

Faruk-e-Azam Bir Protik
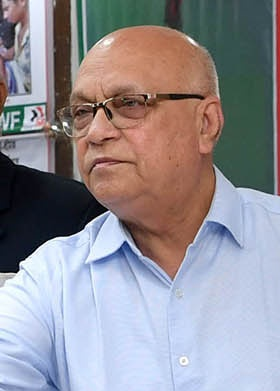
- Faruk in 2025

Adviser for Liberation War Affairs
- In office 13 August 2024 – 17 February 2026
- President: Mohammed Shahabuddin
- Chief Adviser: Muhammad Yunus
- Preceded by: Mozammel Haque
- Succeeded by: Ahmed Azam Khan

Adviser for Disaster Management and Relief
- In office 16 August 2024 – 17 February 2026
- President: Mohammed Shahabuddin
- Chief Adviser: Muhammad Yunus
- Preceded by: Muhibur Rahman Muhib
- Succeeded by: Asadul Habib Dulu

Personal details
- Born: Hathazari, Bengal, British India
- Education: Katirhat High School (1966)
- Awards: Bir Protik

Military service
- Allegiance: Bangladesh
- Branch/service: Mukti Bahini
- Years of service: 1971
- Unit: Sector 10
- Battles/wars: Bangladesh Liberation War ∟ Operation Jackpot

Faruk-e-Azam (Bengali: ফারুক-ই-আজম) is a Bangladeshi military personnel. He was an adviser in the interim government of Bangladesh. He actively took part in the Bangladesh Liberation War and was later awarded the Bir Protik gallantry award by the government of Bangladesh. He was a naval commando and a deputy commander of the expeditionary team in Operation Jackpot.

== Early life and education ==
Faruk-e-Azam was born in the Gul Mohammad Chowdhury house in Farhadabad village, Hathazari Upazila, North Chittagong. Azam completed his secondary education at Katirhat High School in Hathazari in 1966. He passed the Higher Secondary Certificate at the beginning of the Bangladesh Liberation War in 1971.

== Career ==
In 1971, Azam was in Khulna at the beginning of the Liberation War. He experienced difficulties while he was on his way to Chittagong.

On May 6, Azam crossed the border and took shelter in India's Harina Youth Camp. During his stay there, he was enlisted in the navy. After two months of training in Palashi, he was selected for Operation Jackpot.

Three teams were selected to attack the Chittagong port on August 16, 1971. One team could not reach Chittagong, but the other two teams, comprising 37 members, participated in the attack, with AW Chowdhury as the captain. Faruk was a deputy commander of "Operation Jackpot", which was one of the biggest operations against the Pakistani forces during the war carried out in Chittagong port.

Azam was one of the organisers of the first Bijoy Mela in Chittagong in 1989 and was an active member of the Forum for Planned Chittagong.

In 2011, Azam signed a statement in support of Muhammad Yunus, who had been removed from the post of chairman of Grameen Bank.

Following the fall of the Sheikh Hasina-led Awami League government, Azam was sworn in as an adviser of the Muhammad Yunus led-interim government after returning from the United States.
