= Special Service Group (Navy) =

Special operations force of the Pakistan Navy

- خصوصی خدمات گروہ
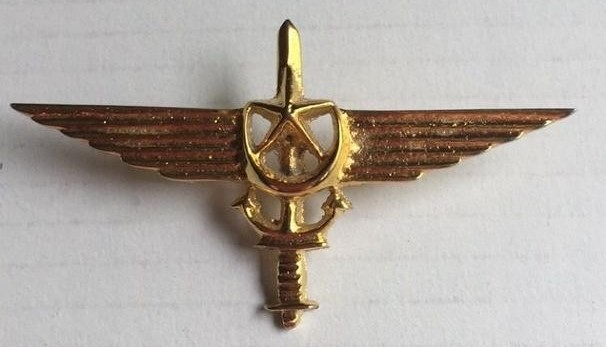
- SSG Navy insignia
- Active: Since 1966; 60 years ago
- Country: Pakistan
- Allegiance: Pakistan Armed Forces
- Branch: Pakistan Navy
- Type: SOF
- Role: Spec ops
- Part of: COMCOAST
- Garrison/HQ: PNS Iqbal; PNS Nathiagali
- Nickname: SSGN
- Motto: Let it not be said that we did not prove equal to the task.
- Engagements: See list: Indo-Pakistani wars and conflicts; Indo-Pakistani War of 1971; Bangladesh Liberation War; Operation Barisal; Operation Jackpot; Munity of PNS Magro in Toulon in 1971; Siachen conflict Conflict in Arab world; Pakistan Military Command–Saudi Arabia War in Afghanistan; Soviet war in Afghanistan Bosnian War; UN Protection Force–Pakistan Forces Sri Lankan Civil War; Military assistance to Sri Lanka War on terror; War in Afghanistan (2001–present); War in North-West Pakistan; Operation Black Thunderstorm; Operation Rah-e-Nijat; Operation Umeed-e-Nuh; Operation Mehran; Operation Zarb-e-Azb; Mutiny on the PNS Zulfiquar; Balochistan insurgency
- Website: SSG(N)

Commanders
- Current commander: Rear Admiral Faisal Amin

The Pakistan Navy Special Service Group, also known as Navy SSG or Pakistan Navy SEALs, is the special operations force tasked with the conducting the small-unit based military operations in all environmental formats of the sea, air, and land by adopting to the tactics of the unconventional warfare.

The command and control of the Special Service Group (Navy) falls under the responsibility of the Naval Strategic Forces Command and its personnel are sometimes directly recruited into ISI's Covert Action Division (CAD) upon their retirements from their military service.

There is no official report on the actual strength or their military missions since their operational works are subjected to the secrecy by the federal government of Pakistan; knowledge of their works and tactics known in public through the only authorized media works and nonfiction works by the navy veteran.

== History ==
=== Birth of the SSG(N) ===
After the second war with India in 1965, the Pakistan Navy recognized the need for establishing the armed forces diving unit to conduct the covert reconnaissance of landing beaches and coastal defenses from the attacks by the approaching enemy. Despite its vision and efforts, the Navy had little experience in combat diving and had little educational understanding about the nature of the seaborne special operations. In 1966, Vice-Admiral S. M. Ahsan took personal initiatives establishing the special operations force within the Navy by organizing the underwater demolition teams (UDTs) tasked with gathering intelligence while operating the midget submarines.

The establishment of the Special Service Group (Navy) lies from the contribution by the Pakistan Army's Special Service Group whose frogmen team— the Musa Company— first initially trained the Navy personnel on the military combat diving in 1966. Initially training of the personnel volunteered for the Special Service Group (Navy) took place in Cherat in Khyber Pakhtunkhwa, first initially getting trained for the coastal defenses.

Crucial training on getting trained on the sea, air, and land environmental formats came from the United States Navy when the first unit of the U.S. Navy SEALs was detached to the Pakistan Navy in Karachi, also in 1966. The teams in the Navy Special Service Group were given training on the armed forces diving, high-altitude parachuting, demolitions, foreign languages, and the intelligence management for the intelligence services.

In 1970, the joint training of the Navy SSG and the U.S. Navy SEALs took place in Naval Base Iqbal in Karachi coast, receiving training and getting the expertise in the sea, air, and land environmental formats.

Since the 1970s, the Navy SSG teams are occasionally sent to the United States for specialized courses and training conducted with the United States Navy SEALs.

=== Deployments, covert actions and current history ===
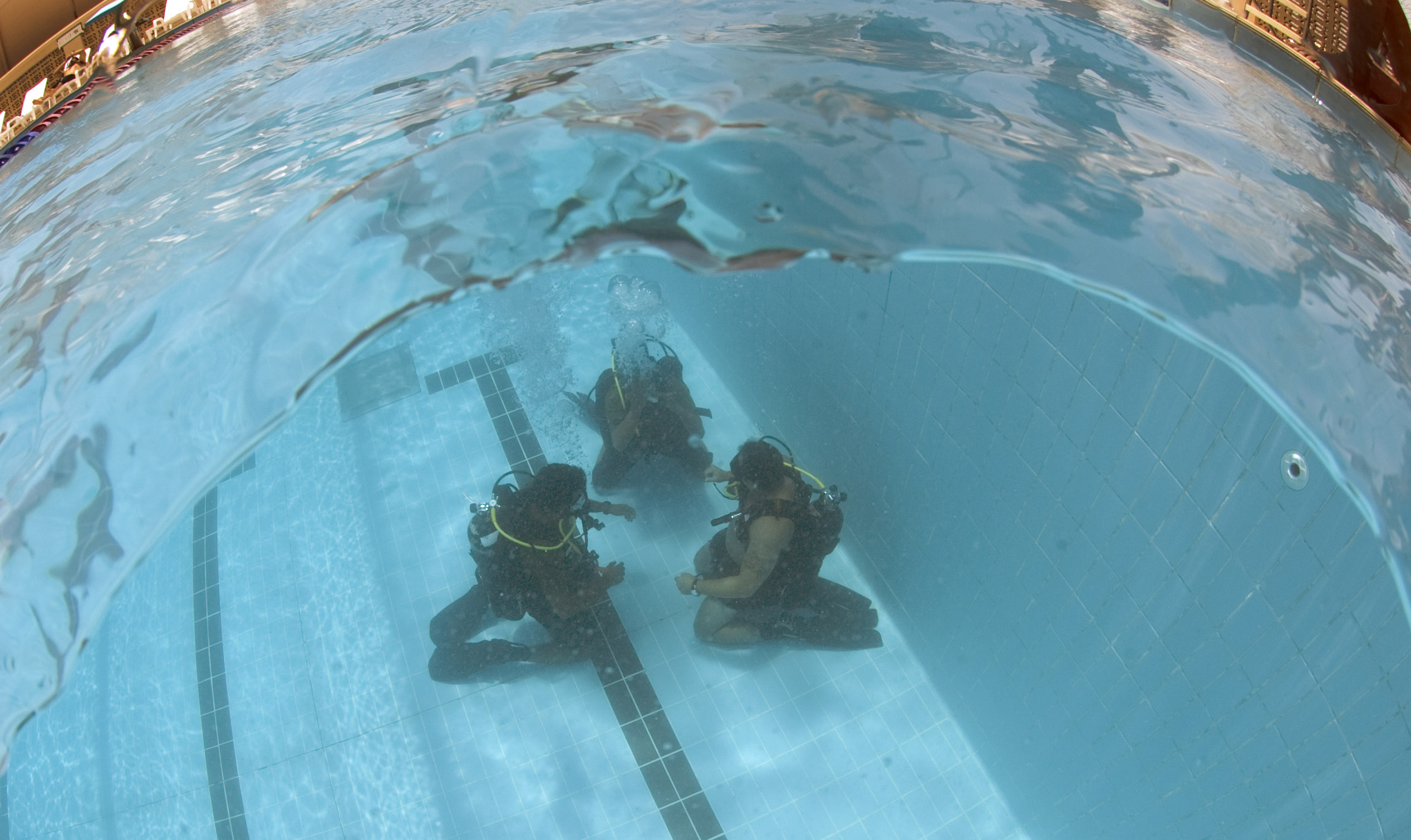
The Navy SSG and the U.S. Navy SEALs conducting the force-protection and under-water special forces training in 2011.

In March 1971, the Navy SSG were deployed in the East-Pakistan to support the Army Special Service Group (SSG) instead of the Army's frogmen team— the Musa Company that remained in Pakistan to conduct the inland waterways operations. Their first direct action based military mission took place in a counterinsurgency operation in Barisal in East-Pakistan, which turned out be a successful in maintaining the control of the city.

In April 1971, the Navy SSG teams were involved in taking another direct actions in Toulon in France when the thirteen East-Pakistani enlists decided to take over the submarine to try defecting to India but their plans were foiled due to advance knowledge that the Naval Intelligence had gathered on their plans. The Navy SSG teams engagement with the Bengali insurgents, taking military counter actions at the ports of Chittagong and the Cox's Bazar. The Navy SSG teams operated from Dacca under the command of the Captain Ahmad Zamir but the teams returned to Pakistan in September 1971 to be trained in operating the X-Craft midget submarines.

After the third war with India in 1971, the Army–Navy interaction continues with the Navy's taking forefront responsibility of setting the important role in the overall architecture of the special operations forces. In the 1980s, the Navy Special Service Group was deployed in providing military assistance to Sri Lankan military during the civil war in Sri Lanka, playing crucial role to curb the insurgency in the country.

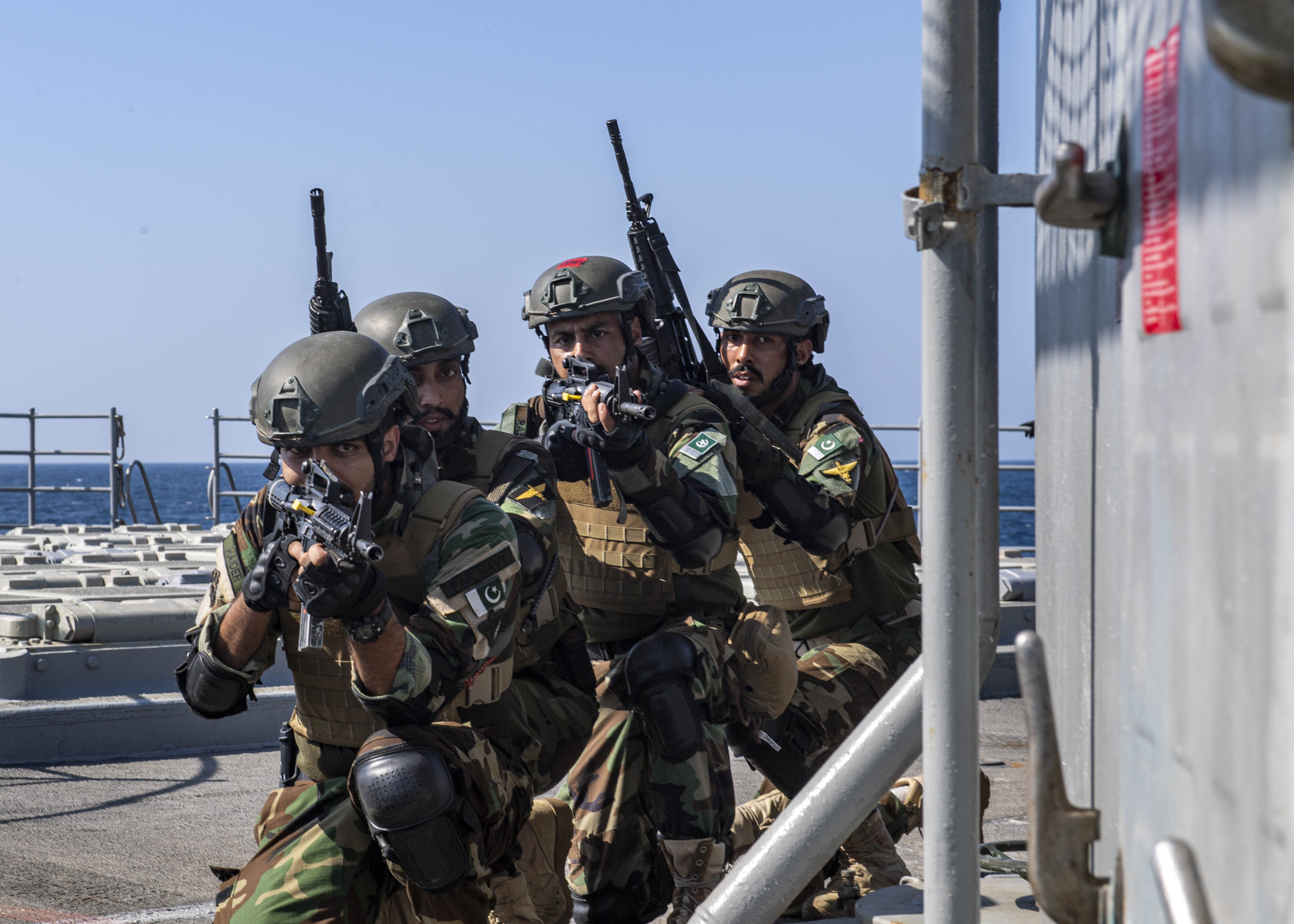
Pakistan Navy Special Forces (SSG-N) operatives execute tactical movements as part of a visit, board, search and seizure (VBSS) exercise aboard the guided-missile cruiser USS Normandy.

The Navy SSG's focused moves towards the special military operations to combating terrorism from the seaborne platform after the terrorist attacks in the United States in 2011. The Navy Special Service Group became involved in the Afghan war and the extended military operations in Western Pakistan in a joint coordination with the Army Special Service Group in a conflict with the foreign fighters, Talibans, and the al-Qaeda.

The Navy SSG's SEAL Team was involved in taking a crucial direct action against Taliban fighters in dislodging their attack on the Mehran Naval Air Station in May 2011.

In 2014, the Navy SEAL Teams successfully engaged the al-Qaeda fighters after they attempted to maneuver the guided missile frigate, the PNS Zulfiquar (251), and successfully neutralize the attack without the damage done to the guided missile frigate as well as apprehending the attackers alive.

== Command structure ==
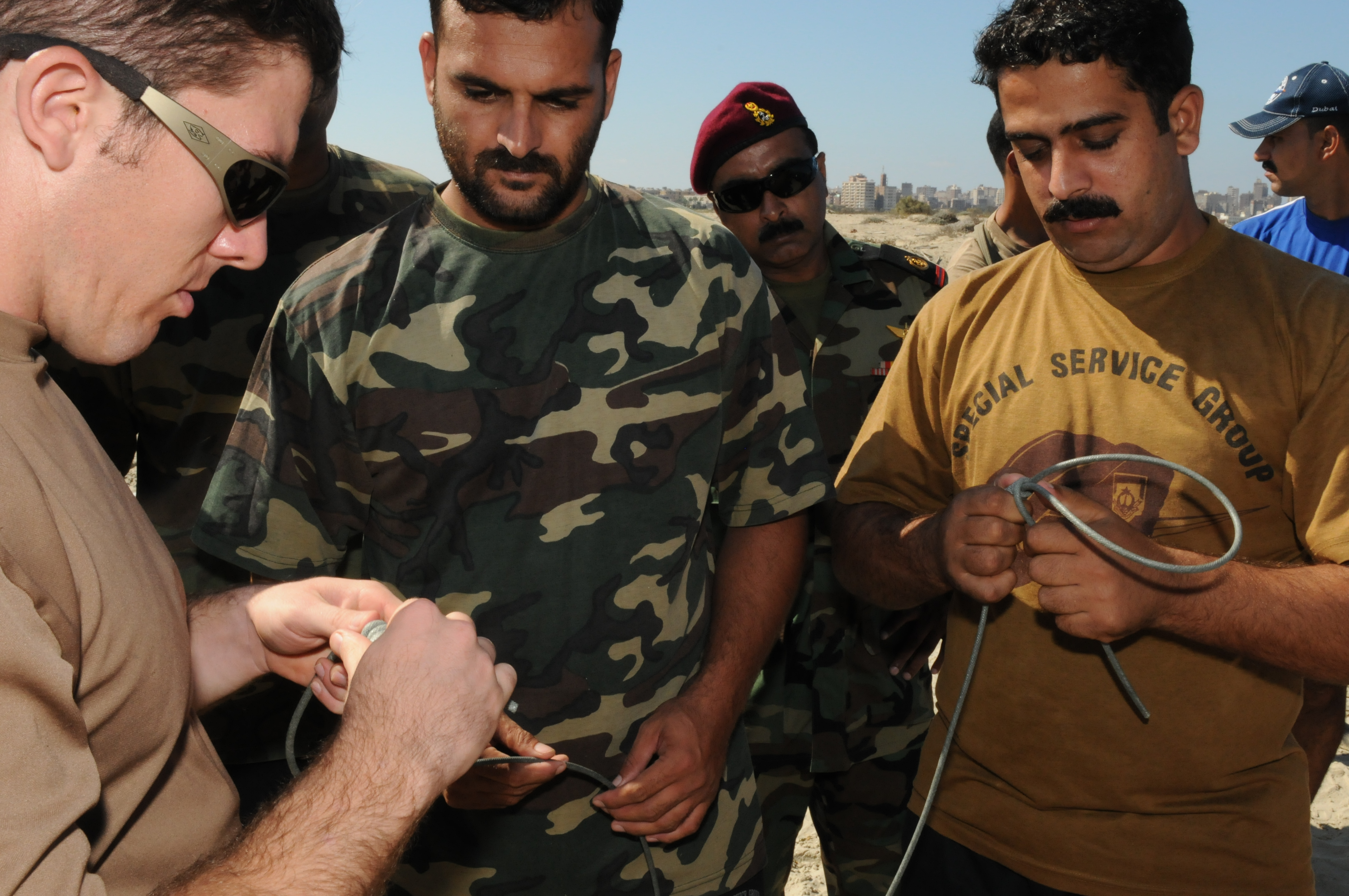
The Navy SSG SEAL Team working towards the underwater demolition charges with the US Navy SEALs during the military exercise in Alexandria in Egypt in 2009.

Due to their selective competitiveness, the demanding military physicals, and the commitment required by the Navy's special operations, the Navy Special Service Group is much more tighter contingent compared to the Army Special Service Group, though the selection for the Navy's Special Service Group is open to all naval personnel serving in the different combat branches of the Navy. The Navy SSG is much more discreet than the Army SSG since their operations and works are subjected to the secrecy marked by the Navy though it is known that it is an all-male special operation force.

The control and command structure of the Navy Special Service Group is based in the PNS Iqbal— the naval base in Karachi, Sindh in Pakistan— and their operations are controlled through the Naval Special Operations Training Center (NSOTC). Their armed forces diving training establishment and structure was initially based in the PNS Himalaya but later consolidated their entire structure with the commissioning of the Iqbal Naval Base on 19 March 1967.

The organizational structure of the Navy Special Service Group follows their Army Special Service Group counterparts, and its organizational structure is based on the command formation reporting directly the Commander of the Coastal Areas (COMCOAST). The Navy Special Service Group has three sub command formations that specialized in their own set of war course of actions–each command is specialized in their criterion of war and are considered specialists in their fields.

The Navy Special Service Group's operational responsibility of conducing the special operations, nonetheless, falls under the command of the Naval Strategic Forces Command (ASFC) operating from the Navy NHQ in Islamabad.

According to the Navy's official website, the Navy Special Service Group is organized with the Iqbal Naval Base that is having responsible to control the each command.

- Navy SSG Command and Control Headquarters (Source: official website)
  - Commanding Officer PNS Iqbal (CO PNS Iqbal) (Source: Sub-command PNS Iqbal)
    - Underwater Demolition/SEAL Group Logistics
    - VBSS Group Logistics
  - Commanding Officer SEAL Group (CO SEAL) (Source: Sub-command SEAL Group)
    - CO SEAL Team (SEAL)
    - CO Airborne Team (ABT)
    - CO Anti-Terrorist Team (ATT)
    - CO Underwater Demolition Team (UDT)
  - Commanding Officer VBSS Group (CO VBSS) (Source: Sub-command VBSS Group)
    - CO Close Quarters Battle Team (CQB Team)
    - CO VBSS Team (VBSS Team)
    - CO Naval Interdiction Operation Team (NIO Team)

Source: PNS Iqbal and Navy Special Service Group organizational structure

In 1968, the Navy Special Service Group was operating at least six Italian-built SX-404 class midget submarine to function as a SEAL delivery vehicle and had priority over the Hangor program at some time in 1970. As of 2019, the Navy Special Service Group currently operates at least three Cosmos-class midget submarines that are designed to be inducted for the SEAL Group, and locally known as the "X-Craft." The Cosmos-class are currently known to be stationed in PNS Iqbal with the SX-404 class.

The military administration at the PNS Iqbal also facilitates the advance training of the selected personnel of the Navy special Service Group to be trained with the U.S. Navy SEALs in California and Virginia.

=== SEALs Teams in the Special Services Group (SSGN) ===
The Navy Special Service Group is composed of the three sub-commands: CO PNS Iqbal, CO SEAL Group, and CO VBSS Group— all are trained in their specialized tasks and considered specialists in the specific type of war operations.

The maritime authors and historians of the Pakistan Navy have provided the rough and the guessed estimation of personnel which was neared around 1,000 SSGN operatives but the department of navy has never issued an actual strength number of its personnel serving in the Navy Special Service Group.

The official strength and the identities of its personnel serving in each sub-commands are subjected to the secrecy by the department of navy and the Defense ministry has never commented or the Navy itself has never issued the official number of strength of its personnel, including the officers commanding, citing security. In the Navy, the commands of the teams varies by the officer ranking from OF-2 rank (lieutenant) to OF-5 rank (commander), depending on the availability and the difficulty posed by the missions.

Groups Of Pak Navy Special Services Group (SSGN)
PNS Iqbal Group	Call Name	Details
PNS Iqbal Group	CO PNS Iqbal	The Logistical HQ of the Navy SSG. CO Iqbal oversees training, logistics, and support measures for SEAL and VBBS Group.
Navy SEAL Group	Call Name	'Details
SEAL Team	SEAL	Oriented towards the Four-dimensionalism—conducts clandestine operations behind the lines without detection on all sea, air, and land formats.
Airborne Team	ABT	Oriented towards HAHO/HALO methods in oceans.
Navy Anti-Terrorist Team	NATT Team	Acted as the quick response team to the seaborne-based terrorist attacks.
Underwater Demolition Team	UDT Team	Acted as the specialists on the methods of underwater demolition behind enemy lines.
Navy VBSS Group	Call name	Details
Visit Board Search Seizure Team	VBSS	Oriented towards the enemy VBSS methods.
Close Quarters Battle Team	CQB Team	Oriented towards the hand-to-hand and close-fire range conflict.
Naval Interdiction Operation Team	NIO Team	Oriented the interdiction and the maritime security operations.

Sources: Pakistan Navy official website and GlobalSecurity.org by John Pike.

== Selection process and training ==
=== Qualification and military physicals ===
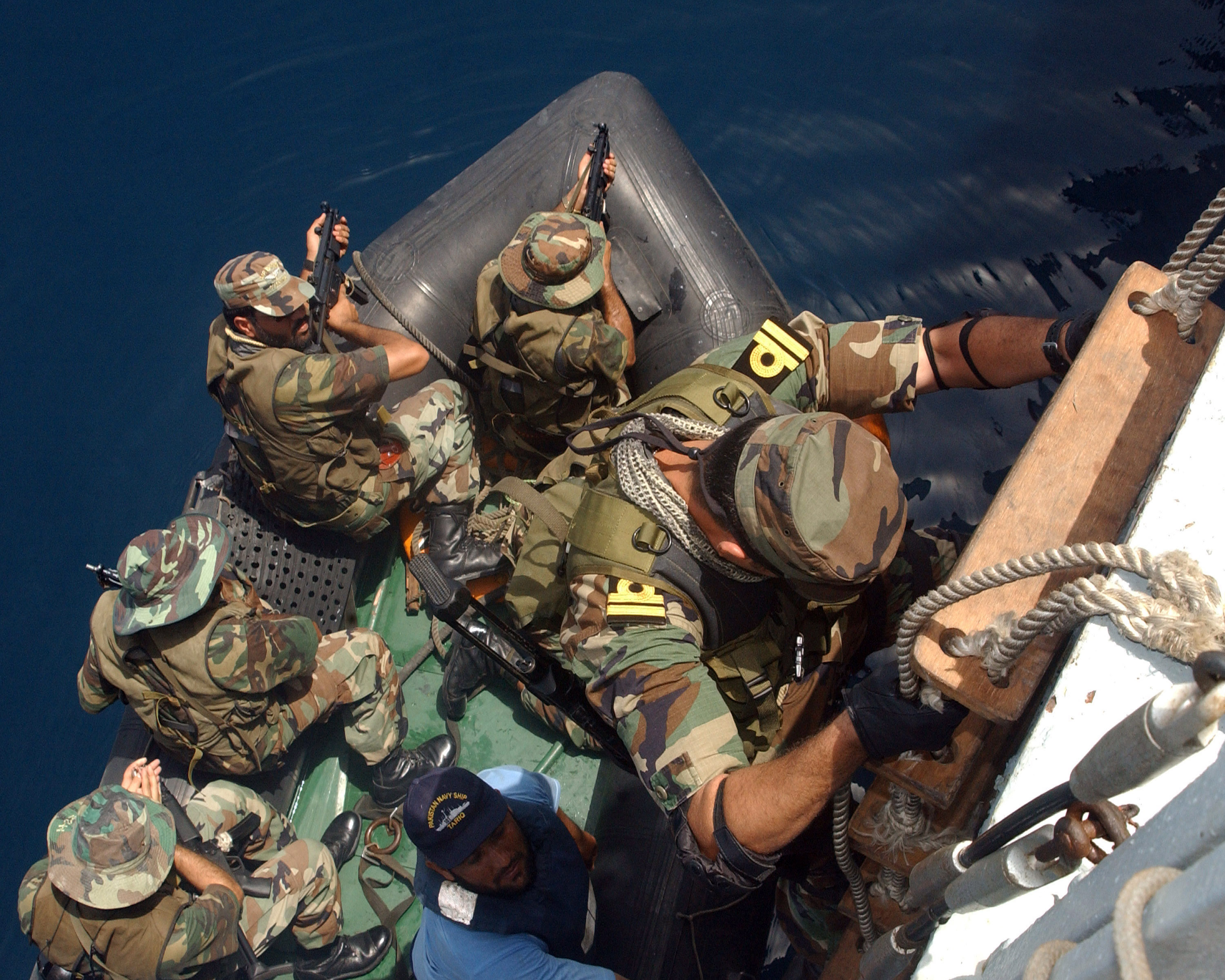
The Navy Special Service Group's VBSS Team boarded on the CRRC boat under the command of Lt. Uzair Khalid preparing to board on the rigid-hulled boat during the drill took place in Sea of Oman in 2005.

According to the Pakistan Navy's Medical Corps reports and the media documentaries, the selection is extremely competitive and demands the strong physical conditioning from their prospective candidates prior admitting into the Navy Special Service Group.

The Navy Special Service Group's qualification and military physical standards are akin and reflects the selection criteria of the United States Navy SEALs selection and training, according to Commander Kashif—the senior trainer in the Navy SEAL Team's interview given to Takrar (lit. Confrontation) host Imran R. Khan.

Those prospective candidates who have very high regards of their self respect and their selfless commitment to serve the country only, anytime their services are needed by the Navy for the area deployment, are the only intakes in the Navy Special Service Group, commented by V-Adm. (retd.) S. Tauquir Naqvi—the retired SEAL Team member and the former commander of the Navy SSG.

Drop out attrition rates from the physical standards of the Navy is average between the 80-to-90%, matching the Army Special Service Group's drop rate in Cherat Those who have failed the mental and physical requirements are then sent to their regular jobs in the Navy. The military physical standards, examinations, and criteria are same for the Army, Navy, Air Force, and Marines' special forces selections and training, often training in close coordination. There are three special operations schools in the Pakistan, the Navy's sniper and frogmen school criteria follows the military physical requirement:

- Naval Special Operations Training Center (Naval SOTC)
  - Must meet army qualifications with swimming standards.
- Sniper School
  - Must have 20/20 or corrected to 20/20 in both near and distant vision in both eyes.
  - Medical Category "A".
- Frogman School
  - Medical Category "A".
  - Must have qualification in Chamber test up to 180 feet sea water.
- Swimming Standards
  - Should be able to swim 200 meters in 7 minutes (breast stroke).
  - Should be able to swim 25 meters Underwater.

=== Selection and training ===
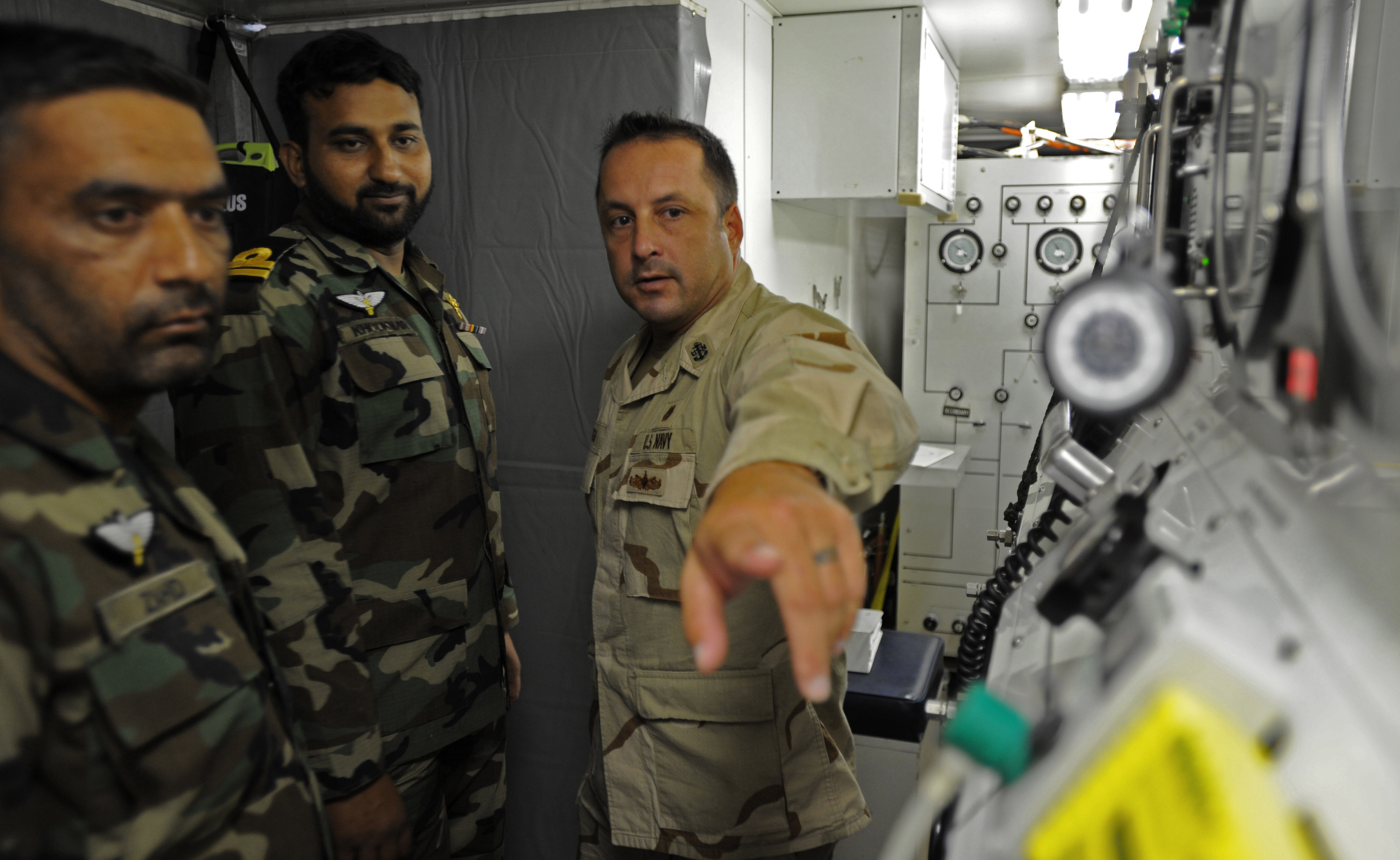
Pakistan Navy SEAL Team members receiving instructions on the compression diving from the US Navy SEALs in 2011.

The military physicals for the getting accepted in the Navy is maintained to have very high standards and requires the prospective individual has to spend at least five years in the Navy that validates their commitment to their profession and the Navy— this is the same requirement for the Army Special Service Group. Training for the Navy Special Service Group is considered to be extremely rigorous. It includes being able to earn the swimming badge after completing the 15 kilometres (9.3 mi) in 10 hours in an open sea, the HALO/HAHO airborne qualification badge, and special weapons qualification badge.

The Navy Special Service Group's training courses :

  - 18-week Clearance Diving Course.
  - 10-week Advance Frogman Course .
  - 4-week Re-Compression Chamber Course.

Training of the Navy Special Service Group also included the training on the Judo/Karateka, Frogman maneuver, and the drownproofing (ability to stay afloat while tide up in the water). The Navy maintains its own Parachute Training School in Oramar based on the Army's Parachute Training School in Cherat, where the prospective individual excelled on its HALO/HAHO and static line skills after performing the combat jump from 15,000 feet (4,600 m)– this course usually held for 4-weeks.

The training courses on the Navy Special Service Group emphasis on the strong mental and physical conditioning that includes the 36-36 miles (58 km) march, a requirement that was first institutionalized by the Army Special Service Group in 1956.

Once the 8-month course is complete, the navy sailors who are volunteering to join the SSGN are then given specialized training in maritime and amphibious warfare at the specialized training school located in Karachi.

The Combat Diver badge is awarded for the course held by the Navy Special Service Group— there are three classes of combat swimmers are recognized: 1st class to complete an 18-mile or more swim in the designated time period; 2nd class to those finishing a 12-mile swim; and 3rd class for a 6-mile swim. Navy's sniper training and air assault courses are held at the Naval Special Operations Training Center (Naval SOTC) in Nathiagali in Khyber-Pakhtunkhwa.

The Navy has its own airborne school in Oramara, frogmen school in Karachi, and the special operations school in Nathiagali. The advance training on the special warfare environments jointly takes place with the Army Special Service Group where the SEAL Teams are trained in long distance marksmanship sniper warfare at the Army Sniper School, arctic warfare at the Army School of High Altitude, mountain warfare at the Army School of Mountain Warfare in Cherat, desert warfare in Chor, and often popular in the country for taking participation with the army's snipers in various competition.

== Notable members ==
Name and Members	Portrait	Notes Rank	Notes on Credentials
Fasih Bokhari	—	Admiral	The Chairman of NAB (2011–13), and the Chief of NavalStaff (1997–1999).
Abdul Aziz Mirza	—	Admiral	The Chief of Naval Staff (1999–02).
S.T.H Naqvi		Vice-Admiral	Commander of Navy Special Service Group, and former Chair of the National Shipping Corporation (2002–05)
Javed Iqbal	—	Vice-Admiral	Diplomat, analyst, and the naval intelligence officer
Shamoon Allam	—	Vice-Admiral	Diplomat
Maqsood Ahmed		Lieutenant	The retired Navy SEAL, and currently heading the taskforce —Special Security Unit in Karachi

== Influence on foreign units ==
Since its establishment in 1966, the Navy Special Service Group provided military training to the Saudi Arabia, Egypt, Qatar, Iran and Sri Lanka, also conducts training exercise with Saudi Arabia, Turkey and Bahrain.

== Appearance and equipment ==
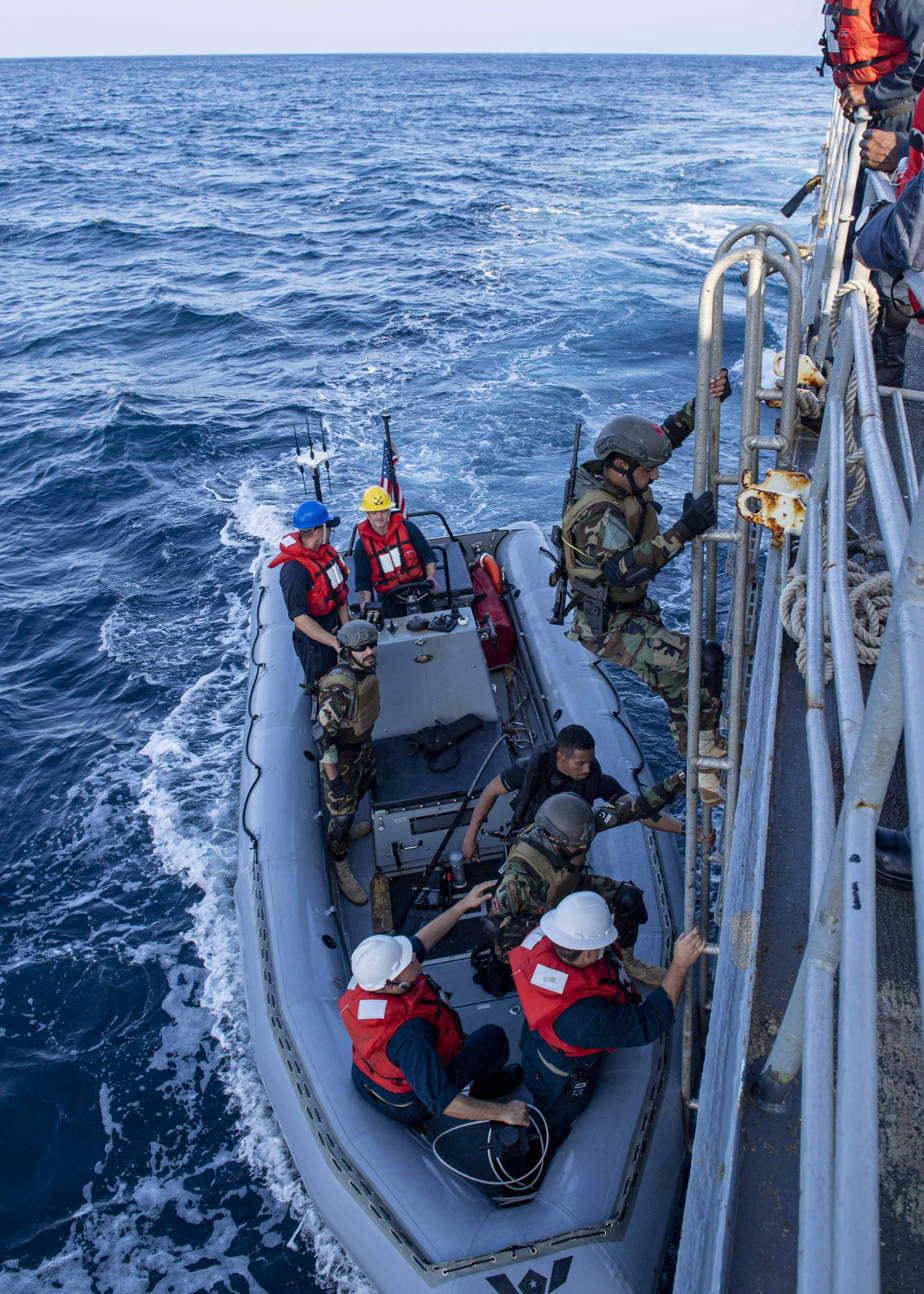
The U.S. M81 is the standard uniform for the Navy Special Service Group's Battle Dress Uniform as seen wore by the VBSS Team operating in the Indian Ocean

The Special Forces in Pakistani military adopted their Battle Dress Uniform in favor of the U.S. woodland (or M81) with a maroon berets in 1990. The Special Forces in Pakistan follows the combat gear of the Pakistan Army as the Army Special Service Group authorized the U.S. woodland (M81) as their battle dress uniform with a maroon berets, a common color for the airborne forces, with a silver metal tab on a light blue felt square with a dagger and lightning bolts, and a wing on the right side of the chest.

The Navy Special Service Group closely follows the Army Special Service Group, adopting to wear the U.S. woodland (or M81) with a maroon berets, a common color for the airborne forces.

The Navy Special Service Group is only distinguished by their officially issued berets— a dark blue beret with three versions of the "fouled anchor" badge for all of its personnel. A metal SSGN qualification badge featuring a vertical dagger superimposed over a midget submarine is worn over the left pocket on dress uniforms. Parachute wings are worn over the right pocket.

=== Weaponry ===
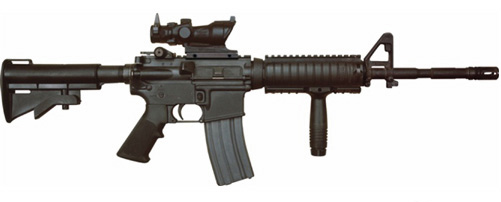
The U.S.-made M4 carbine rifle: This is the standard issue for the Navy Special Service Group.

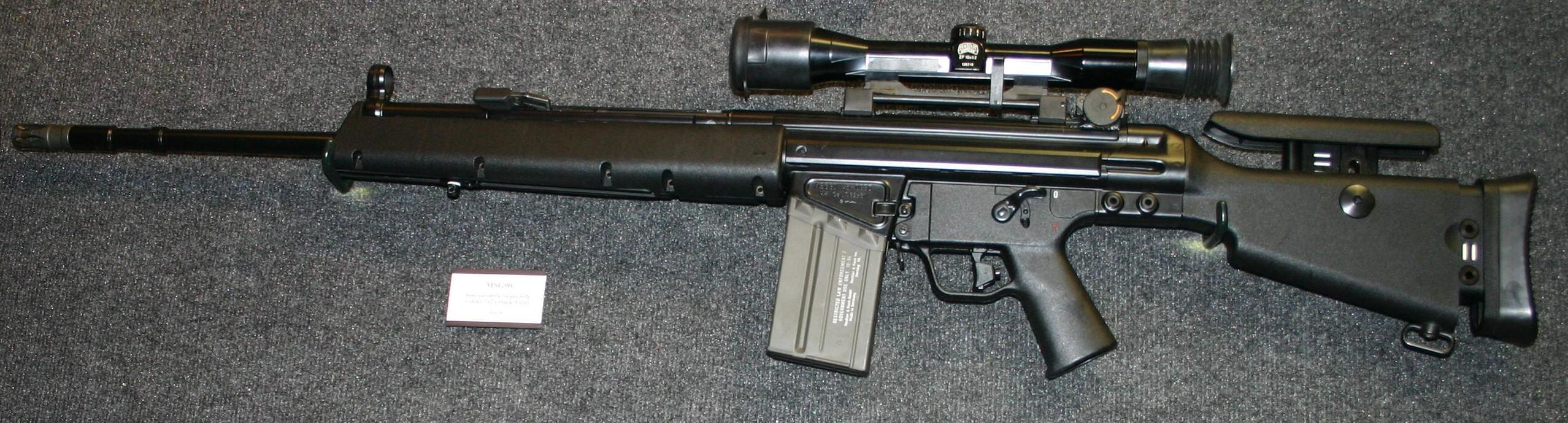
The standard issue for the Navy SSG snipers is the POF PSR-90M as seen in the photage.

Truvelo CMS used by SSGN.

Pistols

- Austria: Glock pistol
- Italy: Beretta 92FS
- USA: Browning Hi-Power

Sub-machine guns

- Germany: Heckler & Koch MP5
- Belgium: FN P90

Assault rifles

- USA: M4A1 Carbine
- Austria: Steyr AUG
- Switzerland: SIG SG 550

Sniper rifles

- Pakistan: POF PSR-90M
- USA: Barrett M82
- UK: Accuracy International AW
- UK: SC-76/86 Thunderbolt
- South Africa: Truvelo CMS .308/.338

Light Machine guns

- Belgium: FN Minimi
- USA: M249

Air Defence & Rocket Launchers

- Soviet Union: RPG7
- USA: SMAW
- Pakistan: Anza MANPADS

Helmets

- Pakistan POF: Standard Helmet
- USA: Light Weight Helmet

Bullet Proof Jacket/Armor

- Pakistan POF: Standard Body Armor

== See also ==
- 1st Marines Battalion (Pakistan)
- Special Service Group (Pakistan Army)
- Special Service Wing (Pakistan Air Force)
- List of military special forces units
