= PNS Iqbal =

Pakistan Navy's base for special operations forces

Coordinates: 24°47′24″N 66°58′47″E

- Badge of Pakistan Navy
- Active: 1966; 60 years ago
- Country: Pakistan
- Branch: Pakistan Navy
- Type: Naval Base
- Garrison/HQ: Karachi coast, Sindh, Pakistan
- Nickname: IQBAL

The Pakistan Navy Station Iqbal (reporting name: PNS Iqbal) is a naval base located off the Karachi coast, Sindh, Pakistan. The PNS Iqbal serves as the command post of the Pakistan Navy Special Service Group that were commissioned in 1966.

Besides serving as the headquarter of the Special Service Group (Navy), the PNS Iqbal is a submarine base for the Cosmos-class submarine, and served as a submarine base since its establishment in 1968.

The School of Special Operations Forces is also based in the PNS Iqbal where navy personnels are trained, qualified, and certified for special operations including qualified in advanced underwater diving courses.

In 1991, the PNS Iqbal was selected to be served as the temporary operational base for the Pakistan Marines when the 1st Marines Battalion was established before the Marines were relocated at Qasim Fort located in the PNS Qasim in Karachi coast.
