= Operation Barisal =

Naval operation in East Pakistan

- Part of Operation Searchlight and Bangladesh War of Independence
Date	25 April 1971 – 1 May 1971
Location	Barisal, Bay of Bengal, East Pakistan (now Bangladesh) 22.8°N 90.5°E
Result	Inconclusive: Initiation of Bangladesh War of Independence

Belligerents
Pakistan; Pakistan Navy; Pakistan Army; Pakistan Air Force	Bangladesh; Mukti Bahini; Supported By: India

Commanders and leaders
Captain Ejaz Chaudhri	Captain M. A. Jalil; Major Rashedul Hasan

Units involved
17th Naval Gun Boat Squadron; Special Service Group Navy (SSGN); 22nd Frontier Force Regiment; 6th Punjab Regiment; No. 14 Squadron	Mukti Bahini Barisal Units

Strength
4 gunboats; 1 destroyer; 1 patrol boat; 24 fighter jets	Unknown number of guerillas At least 1 Water Craft(MV OSTRICH)

Casualties and losses
23 wounded	Unknown 1 Water Craft sunk (MV OSTRICH)
- Further information, see Operation Searchlight, Bangladesh War and the Indo-Pakistani War of 1971
- Location within Bangladesh

Operation Barisal was a code-name of naval operation conducted by Pakistan Navy intended to take control of the city of Barisal, East Pakistan from the Mukti Bahini and the dissidents of the Pakistan Defence Forces. It was the part of Operation Searchlight.

Since the starting of Searchlight, the Mukti Bahini had been staging large scale sabotage missions, disturbing the communications and signals operatives in East Pakistan. Naval Intelligence found traces to the city of Barisal, therefore decided to conduct the operation. The operation was part of Searchlight and was to provide logistic support to the Pakistan Army, by first deploying the Pakistan Navy's gun boats and navy personnel on grounds.
