= PNS Mangro (S133) =

Pakistani submarine (1970–2006)

- After her decommissioning, Mangro beached at the Gadani ship-breaking yard and sold for scrap metal in 2006.

History

Pakistan
- Name: Mangro
- Ordered: 1966
- Builder: DCNS in Toulon in France
- Laid down: 8 July 1968
- Launched: 7 February 1970
- Commissioned: 8 August 1970
- Decommissioned: 2 January 2006
- In service: 1970–2006
- Home port: Naval Dockyard in Karachi
- Identification: S-133
- Fate: Scrapped by National Shipping Corporation

General characteristics
- Class & type: Daphné-class submarine; Hangor class (Subclass)
- Displacement: 860 tons surfaced; 1,038 tons dived
- Length: 57.75 m (189 ft 6 in)
- Beam: 6.8 m (22.3 ft)
- Draught: 4.6 m (15.1 ft)
- Propulsion: Diesel-electric, two shafts, 1,600 shaft horsepower (1,193 kW)
- Speed: Snorkelling: 16 knots (30 km/h); Surfaced: 12 knots (22 km/h)
- Range: Surfaced: 10,000 nautical miles (18,520 km) at 7 knots (13 km/h)
- Endurance: 30 days
- Test depth: 300 m (980 ft)
- Complement: 45, 7 officers, 41 enlisted
- Sensors & processing systems: DRUA 31 radar; DUUA 2B sonar; DSUV 2 passive sonar; DUUX acoustic telemeter
- Electronic warfare & decoys: ARUR 10B radar detector
- Armament: 12 × 550 mm (22 in) torpedo tubes (8 bow, 4 stern); 12 torpedoes or missiles

PNS/M Mangro (S-133) (nickname: '"Mangrove"), was a Hangor-class diesel-electric submarine based on the French Daphné-class design. She was designed, built, and commissioned in Toulon, France. She was in commission from 9 August 1970 until 2 January 2006.

== History ==
Mangro (S133) was laid down on 8 July 1968 and launched on 7 February 1970 at Toulon in France. She was commissioned in the Pakistan Navy on 8 August 1970.

In 1971, her crew began receiving training in France. The ship became involved in the events surrounding the Bangladesh Liberation War in East Pakistan when a mutiny took place on the ship, with mutineers aiming to defect to Bangladesh. At the time, thirteen of her crew were East Pakistanis who planned an operation to take over the submarine and defect to Bangladesh from France. Mangro was ordered to report back to submarine base in Karachi on 1 April 1971 but her plan to depart was interrupted when the 13 East Pakistani enlists decided to seize the submarine.

Their plan, however, was foiled due to the advance knowledge gained by the Pakistani Naval Intelligence, leading the Navy SSG to undertake an armed action plan to counter the mutiny. This resulted in the death of one mutineer, while the others escaped from the base in France and took refuge in the Indian Embassy in Geneva in Switzerland.

After the incident, Mangro sailed to Pakistan under the command of Lieutenant-Commander Shamim Khalid and reported to its base in Karachi. On 22 November 1971, Mangro was deployed under the command of Lieutenant-Commander Shamim to patrol off the Arabian Sea, and eventually detected the Indian Navy's armada that was sent to attack Karachi. No attack was carried out as both nations had not officially declared war, but she tracked the squadron.

On 2 December 1971, Mangro reported back to her base, only to witness the attack on Karachi, by the squadron she had tracked earlier, commence. During the war, Mangro continued her operations and reported back to base safely after the ceasefire between the two nations was reached.

On 2 January 2006, she was decommissioned having completed 34-years of service with the Pakistan Navy.
